= List of islands in the Adriatic =

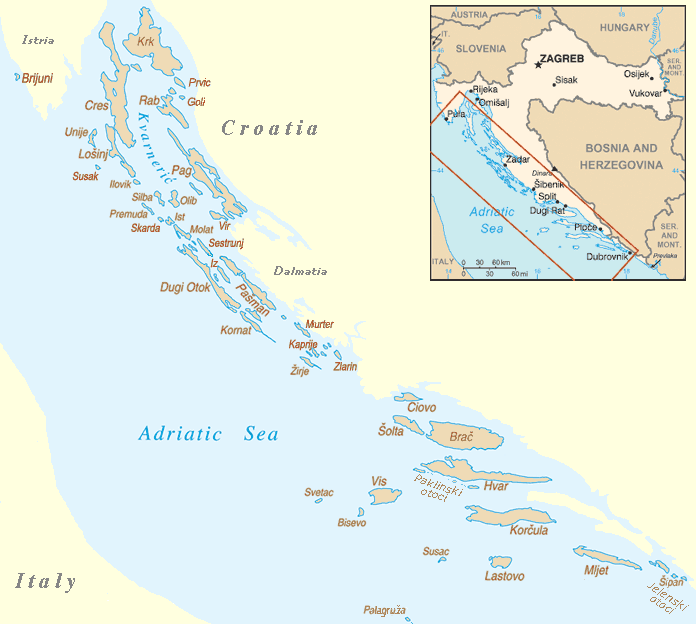
The majority of the Adriatic Sea islands are located in the northeastern Adriatic, near the Croatian coast.

There are more than 1,200 islands in the Adriatic Sea, 69 of which are inhabited. A study in 2000 by the Institute of Oceanography in Split shows that there are 1,246 islands: 79 large islands, 525 islets, and 642 ridges and rocks. The Italian Scuola di Geografia of Genoa states that the number is greater if one includes the small islands in the Italian lagoons of Venice and Grado, and the so-called "islands of the Po delta".

== Croatia ==
Adriatic islands in Croatia include:

Northern seacoast:

- the Brijuni islands
- Krk (one of two islands with the largest area: 405.78 km^{2})
- Cres (one of two islands with the largest area: 405.78 km^{2})
- Lošinj
- Ilovik
- Unije
- Susak
- Goli Otok
- Rab
- Pag (the island with the longest coastline: 302.47 km)
- Olib
- Silba
- Ist
- Molat

Northern Dalmatia:

- Vir
- Dugi Otok
- Ugljan
- Iž
- Pašman
- the Kornati archipelago
- Murter
- Prvić
- Zlarin
- Krapanj

Central and southern Dalmatia:

- Čiovo
- Drvenik
- Šolta
- Brač (the island with the highest elevation: 778m)
- Hvar (the longest island: 68 km)
- Pakleni islands
- Šćedro
- Vis
- Biševo
- Korčula
- Lastovo
- Mljet
- the Elaphiti islands - Koločep, Lopud, Šipan
- Lokrum
- Palagruža
- Veli Brijun,
- Sveti Klement,
- Dolin,
- Svetac (Sveti Andrija),
- Zverinac,
- Sušac,
- Škarda,
- Rava,
- Rivanj,
- Drvenik Mali,
- Kakan,
- Zmajan,
- Jakljan,
- Prežba,
- Tijat,
- Piškera,
- Zeča,
- Vrgada,
- Lavdara Vela,
- Tun Veli,
- Škrda,
- Levrnaka,
- Lavsa,
- Sit,
- Kurba Vela,
- Mrčara,
- Arta Velika,
- Velike Srakane,
- Katina,
- Planik,
- Mali Brijun,
- Vele Orjule,
- Smokvica Vela (Kornat),
- Badija,
- Sveti Petar,
- Žižanj,
- Olipa,
- Škulj,
- Gangaro,
- Babac,
- Koludarc,
- Tramerka,
- Kopište,
- Sveti Marko,
- Lokrum,
- Marinkovac,
- Šilo Veliko,
- Proizd,
- Češvinica,
- Stipanska,
- Murvenjak,
- Lunga (Kornat),
- Male Srakane,
- Košara,
- Obonjan,
- Radelj,
- Zečevo (Pag),
- Kobrava,
- Kručica,
- Arkanđel,
- Kurba Mala,
- Saplun,
- Glamoč,
- Oruda,
- Zvirinovik,
- Krknata,
- Orud,
- Arta Mala,
- Logorun,
- Aba Duga,
- Knežak,
- Oključ,
- Maslinovik,
- Mišjak Veli,
- Tetovišnjak Veliki,
- Tetovišnjak Mali, Kasela,
- Lupac,
- Male Orjule,
- Gangarol,
- Ošljak,
- Trstenik (Cres),
- Mišjak Mali,
- Šćitna,
- Veliki Budikovac,
- Kameni Žakan,
- Drvenik (Zlarin),
- Ravni Žakan,
- Dobri Otok,
- Ruda,
- Stomorina,
- Luški Otok,
- Gustac,
- Palagruža,
- Vela,
- Kozjak,
- Jerolim,
- Veli Pržnjak

== Montenegro ==
- Sveti Nikola Island
- Sveta Neđelja
- Katič
- Ada Bojana/Ada e Bunës
- Stari Ulcinj/Ulqini i Vjetër
- Sveti Stefan (now a peninsula)

Gjerana Rock, Small Rock, Big Rock (Ulcinj Riviera)

=== In Bay of Kotor ===
- Mamula
- Miholjska Prevlaka
- Sveti Marko
- Otok
- Gospa od Škrpjela
- Sveti Đorđe

== Italy ==
The following islands of Italy are in the Adriatic Sea:

- Tremiti islands (off the peninsula of Gargano)
  - San Domino
  - San Nicola
  - Capperaia
  - Cretaccio
  - Pianosa
- Po river delta
  - Isola Albarella
  - Isola Donzella
  - Isola di Ariano
  - Isola Tolle
  - Isola Pila
  - Isola Gnocca

=== Venetian Lagoon ===
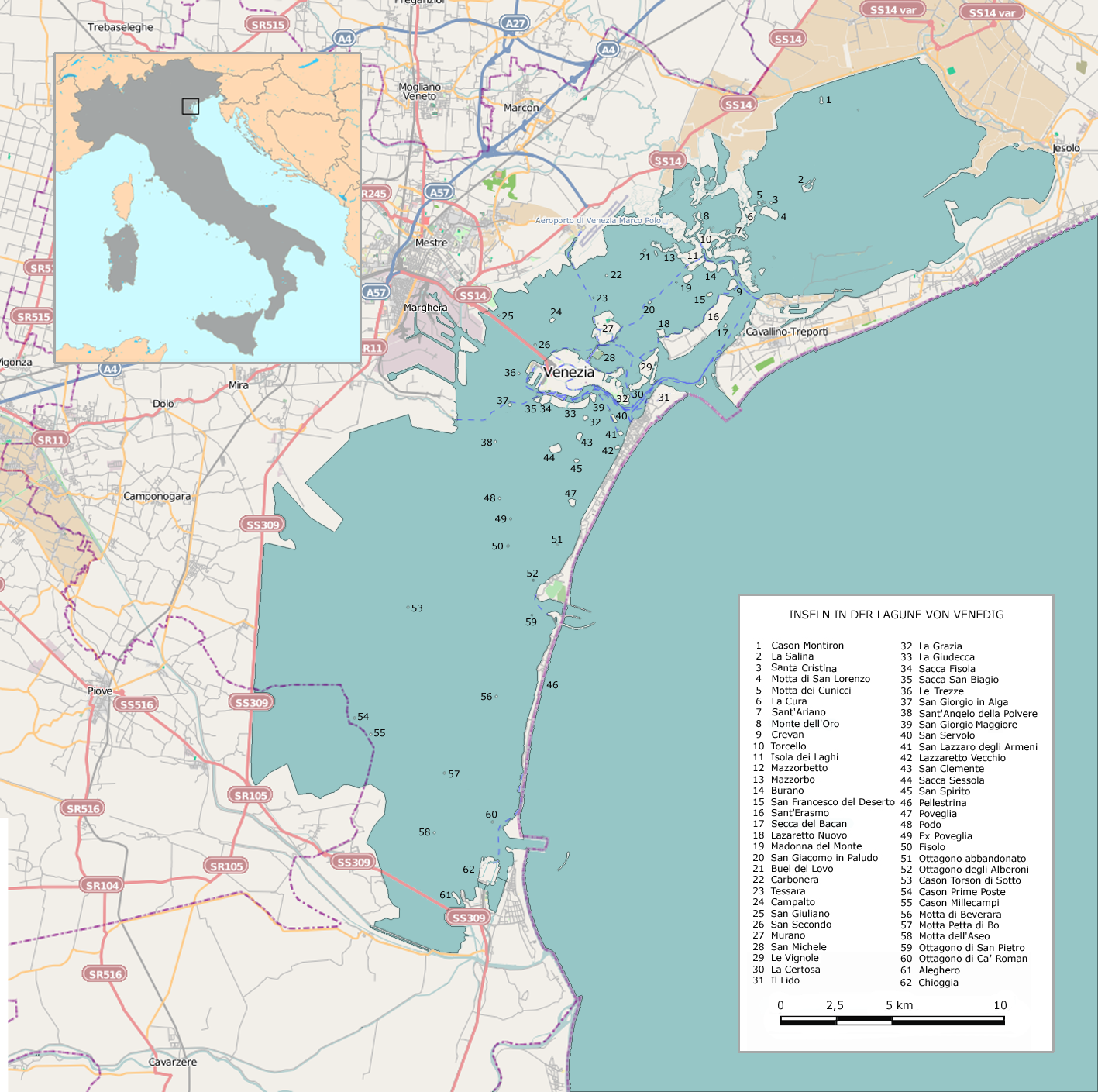
The Venetian Lagoon Islands

The most important of the 130 islands in the Venetian Lagoon are:

- Venice 5.17 km^{2} (2.00 mi^{2})
- Sant'Erasmo 3.26 km^{2} (1.26 mi^{2})
- Murano 1.17 km^{2} (0.45 mi^{2})
- Chioggia 0.67 km^{2} (0.26 mi^{2})
- Giudecca 0.59 km^{2} (0.23 mi^{2})
- Mazzorbo 0.52 km^{2} (0.20 mi^{2})
- Torcello 0.44 km^{2} (0.17 mi^{2})
- Sant'Elena 0.34 km^{2} (0.13 mi^{2})
- La Certosa 0.24 km^{2} (0.09 mi^{2})
- Burano 0.21 km^{2} (0.08 mi^{2})
- Tronchetto 0.18 km^{2} (0.07 mi^{2})
- Sacca Fisola 0.18 km^{2} (0.07 mi^{2})
- San Michele 0.16 km^{2} (0.06 mi^{2})
- Sacca Sessola 0.16 km^{2} (0.06 mi^{2})
- Santa Cristina 0.13 km^{2} (0.05 mi^{2})

Other inhabited islands in the Venetian Lagoon include:

- Cavallino
- Lazzaretto Nuovo
- Lazzaretto Vecchio
- Lido
- Pellestrina
- Poveglia
- San Clemente
- San Francesco del Deserto
- San Giorgio in Alga
- San Giorgio Maggiore
- San Lazzaro degli Armeni
- Santa Maria della Grazia
- San Pietro di Castello
- San Servolo
- Santo Spirito
- Sottomarina
- Vignole

=== Grado-Marano Lagoon ===
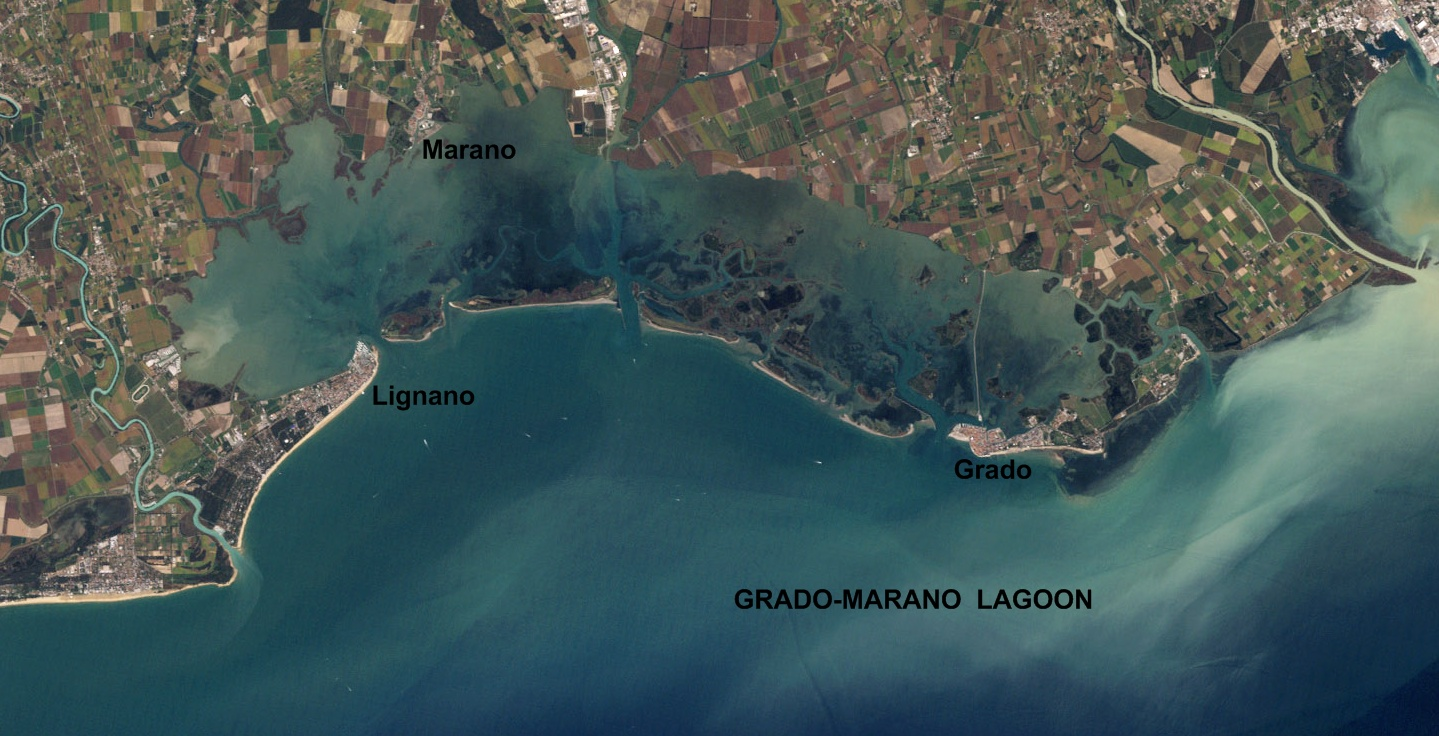
Grado Lagoon satellite image

The most important of the nearly 120 islands in the Grado-Marano Lagoon are:

- Anfora
- Barbana island
- Beli
- Fossalon
- Gorgo
- Grado
- Martignano
- Morgo
- Panera
- Porto Buso
- Ravaiarina
- San Pietro d'Orio
- Schiusa

== Albania ==
- Franc Jozeph Island
- Kunë
- Sazan
- Zvërnec Islands
