= Mimmo (dolphin) =

Mimmo is a bottlenose dolphin who lives in the city of Venice, Italy. The dolphin initially entered the Venetian Lagoon in June 2025. Mimmo has since become a celebrity. Attempts were made to deter them from the area, but they nonetheless returned shortly after.
