= Magistrato alle acque =

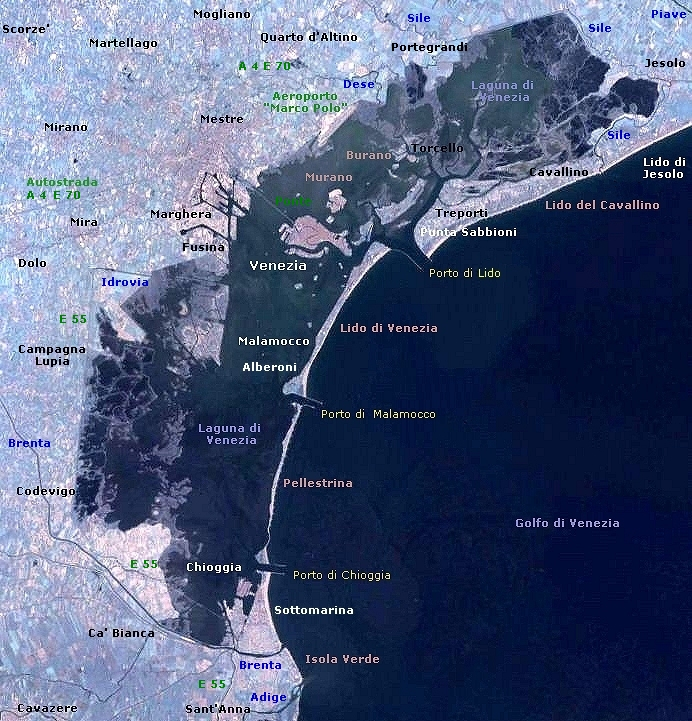
Satellite photo of the Venetian Lagoon

The magistrato alle acque (lit. 'magistrate for the waters') was a collective magistracy of the Republic of Venice, responsible for water management in the Venetian Lagoon. It comprised a series of boards of magistrates established in the early 16th century, and existed until the Fall of the Republic of Venice in 1797. Between 1907 and 2014, the body was revived by the Italian state, with responsibilities extending over the entire Veneto and the Province of Mantua.

== Foundation and history in the Republic of Venice ==
Situated in the Venetian Lagoon, water was vital to the city and state of Venice: the lagoon and its waterways were vital commercial arteries, but also provided the best defence for the city of Venice and guaranteed its independence. In the Middle Ages, the lagoon was administered by the curia publicorum, commonly known as the Poviego, established in 1282 by merging previous boards charged with the maintenance of the city's canals. The Poviego shared this role with the provveditori di común, and in the 15th century with the highest organs of the Venetian government, the Council of Ten and the Venetian Senate.

While until the 15th century the city's constant growth meant that the Lagoon was administered from the perspective of an environment of urban expansion and administration, the slowing of that growth gave way to a view that the lagoon had to be preserved. As a result, in 1501 the three-member board of the savi alle acque (lit. 'wise men for the waters') was created by the Ten, charged with maintaining the waterways and the lagoon; as the Venetian patrician Girolamo Priuli noted, with some exaggeration, their chief task was to "keep the lagoon from becoming mainland". The savi were an executive council, followed in 1505 by the much larger collegio delle acque ('college of the waters'), which took over decision-making on hydraulical matters from the Ten and the Senate. Along with the savi, the collegio also comprised the Doge of Venice himself, and a number of other members, usually around fifty, usually veteran and high-ranking members of the Venetian government. In 1521, another three-member board, the esecutori alle acque ('executors on the waters') was created. Finally, in 1678, the position of inquisitore was established.

Like most magistracies of the Venetian Republic, these councils were filled by election for fixed terms exclusively from among the Venetian patriciate. To provide expert assistance, the magistracy employed a number of professional personnel, including secretarial staff and hydraulic technicians. Known as the periti or proti (sing. proto), these were drawn from the burghers (cittadini ordinari) and held their position for life. From 1542, the post of a matematico pubblico ('public mathematician') was also instituted to provide expert advice.

In addition, in a semi-ritualized practice, the collegio delle acque employed the advice of eight experienced fishermen nominated from the fishing guilds of the Lagoon's main settlements.

The duties of the magistracy were to keep the Lagoon from silting up, maintain the entries to the Lagoon open for navigation, maintain the sandbars (lidi) intact, and regulate the rivers flowing into the Lagoon. In addition, the magistracy also had a fiscal aspect, as it was responsible for the collection of a five percent inheritance tax, through which it financed its work.

The importance of the Lagoon for Venice also meant that the magistrato alle acque enjoyed a higher authority and priority than other competing agencies, most notably the provveditori sopra beni inculti, founded in 1556 to promote the cultivation of lands in Venice's mainland possessions in the Veneto: on issues related to the management of the rivers feeding the Lagoon, the Magistrato alle acque invariably had the final say, leading to aborted requests for irrigation, or canalization of the Sile, Brenta, and Piave rivers in ways that ensured the uninterrupted supply of the Lagoon, but exposed their surroundings to frequent flooding.

== The magistrato alle acque in modern Italy ==
Magistrate of the waters for the provinces of Veneto and of Mantua
- Magistrato delle acque per le province venete e di Mantova

Agency overview
- Formed: May 5, 1907
- Dissolved: June 14, 2014
- Headquarters: Palazzo dei Dieci Savi Sestiere San Polo, 19

The original magistrato alle acque disappeared with the fall of the Republic of Venice in 1797, but in 1907, the magistracy was re-established by the Italian state as a public institution. The magistrato alle acque was led by a chairman named by the President of the Italian Republic in agreement with the council of ministers. Its seat was in the Palazzo dei Dieci Savi Venice, and it managed the entirety of Triveneto basin.

Its powers are primarily exercised over the Veneto region as well as the Province of Mantua. However, for external projects that may affect its area of interest, the magistrato alle acque may extend its authority until the autonomous region of Trentino-Alto Adige as well as the region Friuli-Venezia Giulia. The governance of this institution remain based around the surveillance of the lagoon area but may now concern the operations of desalination, improvement, and port regulation.

It was abolished in 2014 in the wake of a corruption scandal in the MOSE Project.

== Sources ==
- Ciriacono, Salvatore (2006). Building on Water: Venice, Holland and the Construction of the European Landscape in Early Modern Times. Translated by Jeremy Scott. Berghahn Books. ISBN 978-1-8454-5065-6.
- Mathieu, Christian (2007). Inselstadt Venedig: Umweltgeschichte eines Mythos in der Frühen Neuzeit (in German). Cologne, Weimar: Böhlau Verlag. ISBN 978-3-4121-6806-3.
- Ortalli, Gherardo (2004). "Forms of Knowledge in the Conservation of Natural Resources: from the Middle Ages to the Venetian "Tribe"". Nature Knowledge: Ethnoscience, Cognition, and Utility. Berghahn Books. pp. 391–398. ISBN 978-1-5718-1823-2.
