= Sacca Sessola =

Island in the Venetian Lagoon

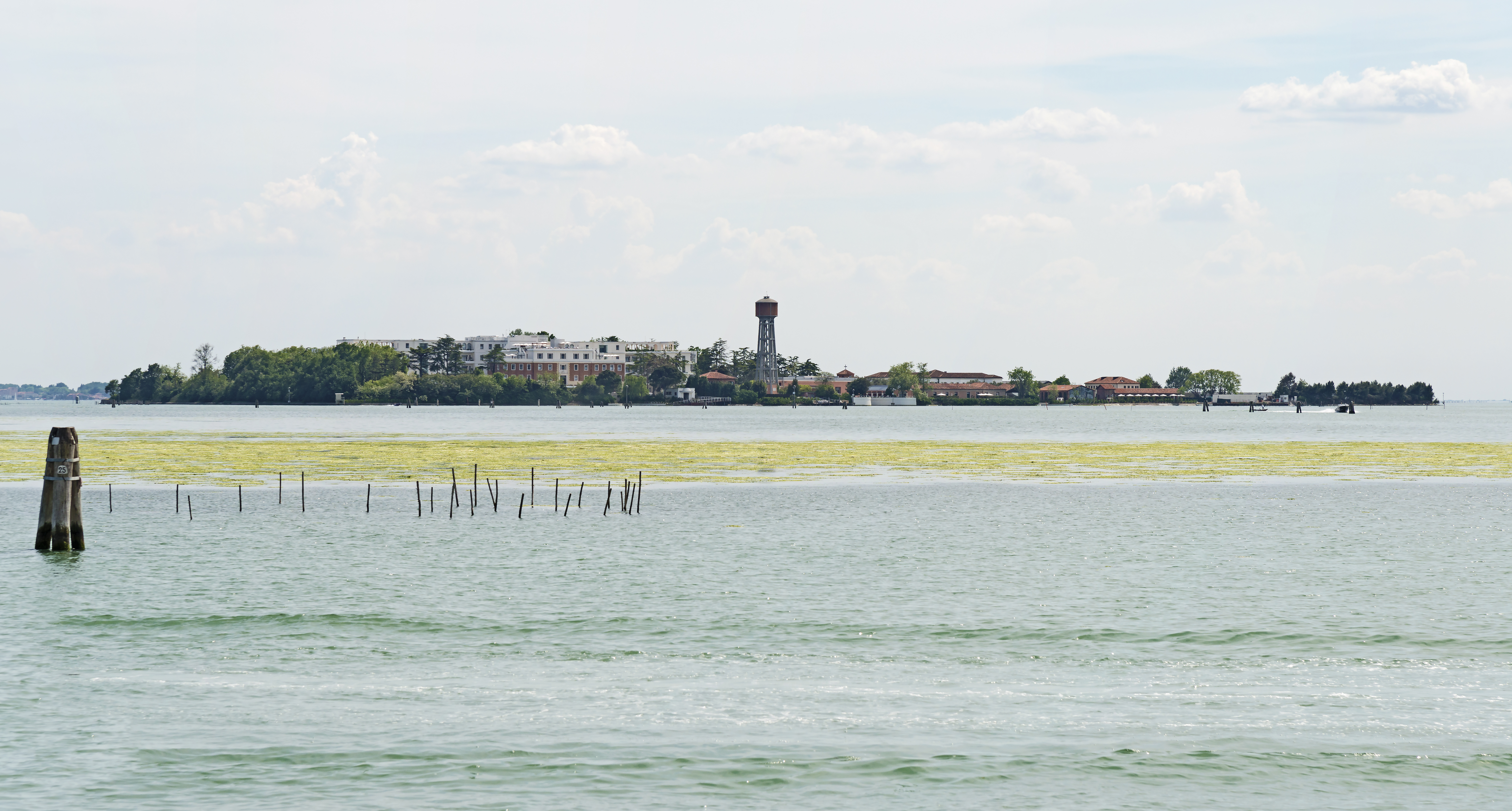
- View of the island

- Location within Venetian Lagoon

Geography
- Coordinates: 45.406111°N 12.322222°E
- Adjacent to: Venetian Lagoon
- Area: 16.03 ha (39.6 acres)

Administration
- Italy
- Region: Veneto
- Province: Province of Venice

Sacca Sessola, also called Isola delle Rose or "Island of Roses", is an island in the Venetian Lagoon, Veneto, Italy. The island's name is derived from combination of the words sacca, Venetian for an artificial island, and sessola, a tool used to remove water from ships.

Sacca Sessola is one of the biggest islands in the lagoon, with an area of 16.03 ha (40 acres), and also one of the youngest. It was built from 1860 to 1870, and has since been used a fuel dump, hospital, farming land, and UNESCO research complex. The entire island now houses the JW Marriott Venice Resort and Spa

== History ==
The island was built in the southern part of the Venetian Lagoon from 1860 to 1870 using debris generated by commercial port construction at Santa Marta in Venice. Initially state-owned, the island was sold to the municipality of Venice in 1875 and converted into a fuel depot. Later, it was converted to agricultural use.

In 1892, construction for a quarantine hospital on the island was begun. Following the cholera epidemic of 1911, the hospital was expanded and made Venice's premier facility for the treatment of tuberculosis, replacing the hospital at Santa Maria della Grazia. It was closed during the First World War and re-opened and expanded during the 1920s. In 1929, the municipality donated the island to the National Institute for Social Security, which expanded and repurposed the hospital as a pulmonological facility. The new 300-bed complex was inaugurated by King Victor Emanuel III in 1936. The pulmonary hospital remained operational until 1979, when it was abandoned.

Ownership reverted to the Venetian municipality in 1982, which in turn donated it to the UNESCO International Center for Marine Sciences and Technology ten years later. In 2000, the island was sold to a multinational company and converted into a luxury hotel complex, which failed to open. In 2015, the island was sold to JW Marriott, which renovated the island into its present form as a resort and spa and renamed it "Isola delle Rose".
