= Gronda lagunare =

Body of water in Venice

Gronda lagunare (lagunar eaves) is a term used to indicate the area of the Lagoon of Venice by its mainland shore. The term is derived from the fact that it receives the waters from the rivers and streams which flow into the lagoon from the drainage basin of the plain of the mainland by the lagoon. It is also reached by the tidal flows form he sea. It is meant to be a belt that forms a transition area between the open lagoon and the mainland.

Since it is between the inflow of freshwater form rivers and sea saltwater, in its natural state it would be an area with freshwater wetlands, barene (saltmarshes), velme (mudflats), and lagunar channels which forms a transitional belt between the mainland and the open lagoon rather than forming a fixed boundary, with its conformation changing according to the interplay of the hydrodynamic forces of the lagoon and their hydrodynamic equilibrium. However, this complex hydrologic and environmental system has undergone dramatic changes, both natural and, especially, man-made and has by and large lost it character as a transitional belt.

== Hydrologic characteristics of the lagoon and the gronda lagunare ==
The drainage basin is a mildly inclined plain of alluvial formation to the north and along the sides of the lagoon which drains the watercourses coming from the Dolomites range of the Alps or from outcrop springs in the plain. into the lagoon and the nearby sea coasts. The gronda lagunare receives the waters of these watercourses and the sediments they carry. It has areas of freshwater wetlands near the mouths of these watercourses. It is also reached by the tidal flows which come through the lagoon from the inlets of its coastal shoreline in its south.

A coastal lagoon is formed by the conjoint interaction between the freshwater of the inland watercourses and of the saltwater of the sea and is subject to a delicate hydrologic equilibrium between these. The sea coastline is composed of the peninsulas of Cavallino and Sottomarina, which form the northern and southern part respectively, and the barrier islands of Lido and Pellestrina in the middle. Between these formations, three inlets (Lido, Malamocco and Chioggia) let the tidal flow come into the lagoon.

Over centuries the sediments brought in by the inland watercourses can cause significant silting and eventually fill the lagoon in, which can be turned into it into a delta by the force of the rivers. In the long run, the force of the sea could have two effects. One is to render the inlets non-navigable through the accumulation of sand carried by the current and, ultimately, closing them, turning the lagoon into inland waters closed off from the sea. The other effect is an opposite one, a progressive erosion of the barrier islands through exceptional tides and, especially, storm surges. If the sea was to erode the barrier islands to an insignificant size or submerge them, the lagoon would be turned into a coastal bay.

The Republic of Venice built a series of murazzi (imposing walls made of Istrian stone) along the seaward coasts of Pellestrina and Sottomarina to protect them from erosion by the sea between 1748 and 1784. The Republic also diverted many of the rivers which drain into the lagoon away from it to prevent silting in some of its areas. This altered the nature of the gronda, decreasing its areas of freshwater wetlands. It also altered the hydrogeographic balance between the input of fluvial and sea water in the lagoon. In the late 19th and early 20th century breakwaters were built at the inlets to stop the accumulation of sand there and ensure their navigability.

The fluvial system of the gronda lagunare was complex and unstable. Several rivers flow into the lagoon along its length. They are, from east to west, the Sile, Zero, Dese, Marzenego, Muson, Bottenigo and Brenta. Moreover, there are affluent streams, ditches and drainage canals. Heavy rain could cause hydrologic stresses which had a cascading effect. The Zero could overflow and pour its waters into the Dese, which in turn would overflow and pour its waters into the Marzenego. Downpours could lead to frequent overflows and floods in the countryside over a wide area and changes in the courses of riverbeds. Due to the low gradient of the pain there was also a tendency for water to stagnate in the lower tracts of the rivers. This created wetlands in the gronda area, forming an amphibious environment between the mainland, lagoon and sea. In addition, the rivers continued on into the shallow lagoon, often reaching the sea, forming rivulets between the lagunar saltmarshes, bringing sediments into it and causing silting and mixing freshwater and saltwater, creating brackish water marshes which were liable to lead to problems with malaria.

== Hydrologic transformations ==
=== River diversions ===
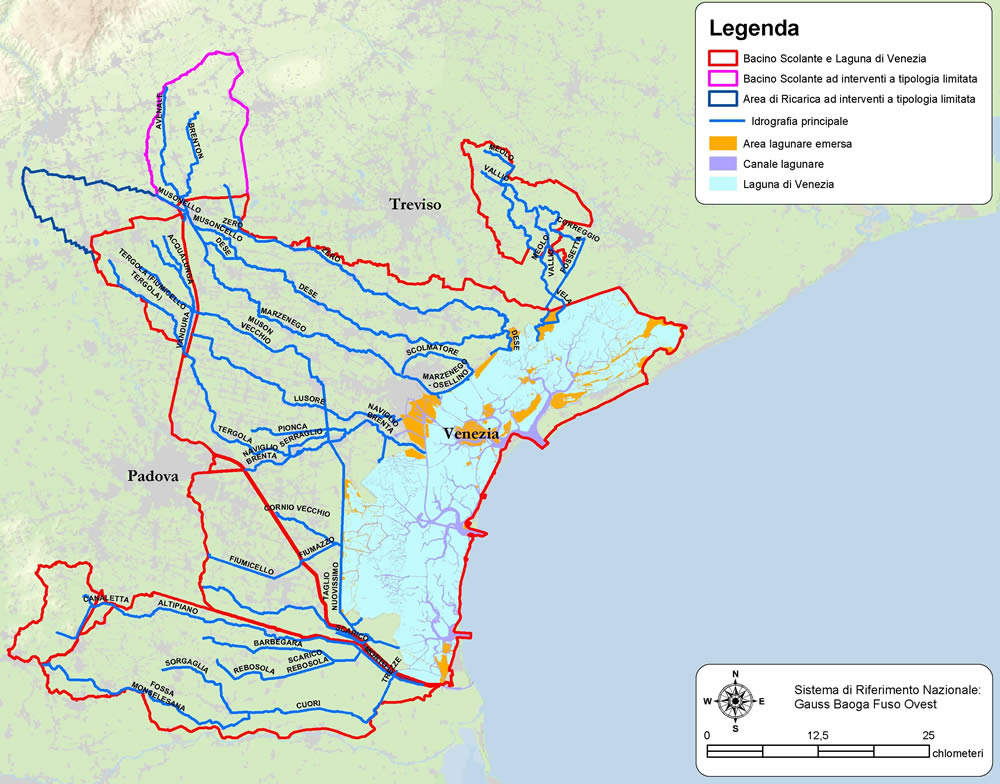
Rivers of the Lagoon of Venice

Since the instability of the hydrogeography of the gronda lagunare, which could lead to floods, silting, stagnation of water and the development of wetlands, the Republic of Venice carried out many river diversion works over several centuries. Venice's main concern was to protect the lagoon form silting, which could hamper the navigation of the lagunar channels and the gronda rivers which provided communication routes for her trade with the mainland. Concern about floods in the mainland countryside was not a high priority. As a result, Venice created diversion canals close to the edge to the lagoon as it was cheaper than carrying out such works further inland. Effective flood prevention would have required catching the water of overflowing watercourses further upstream. In addition, the canals further inland would have had a greater incline, guaranteeing a good pace of water flow which would have prevented floods and water stagnation. Instead, canals by the lagoon had an insufficient incline, which meant that they could easily overflow and create floods and pools of stagnant water and wetlands, worsening the hydrologic situation of the gronda lagunare.

The Osellino canal was dug between 1510 and 1520 to partially divert the waters of the River Marzenego which flowed into the lagoon at Mestre. It runs along the central part of the lagoon to the east of Mestre, close to its edge, and ends at the mouth of the River Dese, in the northern part of the lagoon. It was intended to prevent silting in the lagoon and to stop the floods in the countryside of this area. However, it did not stop the latter. Being so close to the lagoon, it lacked incline, flowed too slowly and created areas of stagnant waters and wetlands which caused problems with malaria. The Republic of Venice never implemented plans for canals to collect the waters of all the rivers in the area (including the Muson, Dese and Zero) further inland to effectively prevent flooding because it was too expensive. These problems were resolved in the 20th century.

Between 1674 and 1683 Taglio del Sile canal was dug. It diverts the waters of the River Sile which flowed into the northern part of the lagoon to the east of the above-mentioned rivers and takes them out of the lagoon, running along its edge. Silting in the lagoon was prevented but, again, the problems of floods and the formation of wetlands worsened. The river delta behind the canal progressively became eroded and the ground got lower due to sediment compaction. As a result, the countryside was on average half a metre lower than the canal which, with rain, would overflow. In 1871 the left bank of the canal was raised and in 1889 a siphon underpass was built to allow two local rivers (the Vallio e Meolo) to flow into the lagoon. This only alleviated the problems which were finally solved in the 1930s with the construction of a water pumping station.

To the west of Mestre, the River Brenta and other nearby watercourses caused floods and silting in the central area of the lagoon which led to disruptions in that part of the mainland countryside and obstructed navigation on the watercourses which connected Venice with the mainland. To counter this, between the 14th century and the early 16th century, the Republic of Venice diverted the waters of this fluvial system, especially the Brenta, with a series of canals. After a number of ineffective interventions two long canals were created.

Between 1489 and 1507 the Brenta Nova canal was dug to divert the Brenta away from its original mouth at Fusina, near Venice, to Conche, in the southern lagoon. It started at Dolo and run roughly parallel to the edge of the lagoon a few miles further inland. As this canal was close to the lagoon, it did not have a sufficient gradient and caused repeated floods upstream. Moreover, the new mouth brought sediments which created a large delta (over 30 km^{2}) which partially buried the southern lagoon.

Between 1554 and 1577 an embankment (the Parador di Brondolo) was built to take the mouth of the Brenta at Conche, together with the mouth of the nearby River Bacchiglione, away from the lagoon of Venice. The two rivers were made to flow into the lagoon of Brondolo, which was to the south of the lagoon of Venice and connected to it. This lagoon, which did not have a direct access to the sea, was turned into a freshwater lake and, later, it became completely silted up. The sea shore in this area advanced into the sea, forming a cuspate foreland. The southern part of the Lagoon of Venice, having lost the sediment input for the Brenta, became exposed to the erosive effect of the tidal flow, which led to a decrease in its above-water lands, a reduction of its saltmarshes and the progressive erosion of its inner deltas and of the fluvial channels that cross it.

A new canal, the Taglio Novissimo, was dug between 1610 and 1791 to divert the waters of the rivers Magra, Muson, Bottenigo, Volpago, Bionca and Tergola as well as those of the Brenta. It started further east than the Brenta Nova (at Mira) and was thus longer than the Brenta Nova. It run a similar course and most of it was along the edge of the lagoon. Its objective was to resolve the problem of flooding. However, as it run along the edge of the lagoon, it incline was low and did not stop the floods. This problem was solved only in the late 19th century with the creation of the Cunetta canal which starts much further inland and to the east of the lagoon (at Stra, near Padua) and joins the Brenta Nova canal at its southern end and thus has the required incline.

These river diversions also altered the hydrodynamic balance of the lagoon and new problems arose. Large areas of the lagoon became exposed above water during low tides and the inlets which provided communication to the sea became poorly navigable because of an accumulation of sand brought by the sea currents. In the early 17th century Benedetto Castelli, an engineer, argued that the former was due to the scarcity of the inflow of freshwater into the lagoon caused by the diversion of the River Brenta and that the latter was due to the sand brought by the sea current no longer being counteracted by the freshwater flowing into the lagoon from the opposite direction. He proposed to bring back the waters of the Brenta in a controlled manner so as to bring back the inflow of water into the lagoon but in a way that would prevent silting. He was also opposed to the planned diversions of the River Sile and four other mentioned rivers. This was rejected.

The problem of sand accumulation at the Malamocco and Lido inlets was eventually resolved with the construction of breakwaters between 1838 and 1856 (for the Malamocco inlet) and between 1881 and 1910 (for the Lido inlet). The breakwaters keep the coastal current at bay and trap the sand it carries.

The river diversions and the resulting loss of freshwater input into the lagoon also led to a reduction in the areas of freshwater wetlands in the gronda lagunare.

=== The "stiffening" of the gronda lagunare ===
In Italian the term "stiffening" of a shore or bank refers to the construction of embankments. Such works create rigid structures which make the shore or bank rigid compared to a natural state and constrains its waters. The term comes from the word rigido, rigid. In relation to the gronda lagunare, it indicates the development of artificial shores along the gronda and, through this, the creation of a fixed lagunar boundary which prevents natural fluctuations of its edge with a consequent loss of gronda's character as a transitional area between the open lagoon and the mainland with lagunar deltas and wetlands.

Much of the gronda lagunare has been "stiffened" by the above-mentioned river diversions carried out by the Republic of Venice (particularly with the Taglio del Sile, Osellino and Taglio Novissimo canals). It has been accentuated by 20th century developments. This situation started to draw attention in the 1970s, when scientists determined that this exacerbates the risk of flooding in Venice and elsewhere in the lagoon.

The river delta which was created in the southern part of the lagoon by the Brenta Nova canal and the nearby areas saw extensive land reclamations in the early 20th century. This dramatically changed the characteristics of this area, wiping out the local saltmarshes and patches of the lagoon and completely rearranging the local lagunar hydrographic network. It triggered substantial subsidence, causing in the long-term a lowering of the ground by a few metres.

A new airport, the Venice Marco Polo Airport, was built by the edge of the central part of the lagoon, in the Tessera area in 1961. Its 3.3-kilometre (2.05 miles) long runway runs along the coast of the lagoon. The airport was built over part of the Osellino canal (which was covered), some 500 metres before it ends in the River Dese.

The central area of the lagoon has been affected by industrial development. In the 1950s the town of Marghera, on the mainland coast of the lagoon, started to become an industrial area. The digging of a canal, the Malamocco-Marghera canal, was proposed. Its purpose was to link the Malamocco inlet access of the sea into the lagoon to a second industrial zone at the port of Marghera and make it accessible to large ships. With the development of large oil tankers in the 1960s, the project was modified and the canal was dug to a greater depth to allow these vessels though. For this reason the canal was nicknamed canale dei petroli (oil canal). The works started in 1964 and finished in 1968. An oil refinery was also built.

The sediments which were dredged to create the Malamocco-Marghera canal were used to create artificial islands, the casse di colmata A, (155 hectares), B, (385 ha) and D-E (752 ha), for the creation of a third industrial area at the port of Marghera. The original plan envisaged further artificial islands that would fill in the whole of the saltmarsh area between Marghera and Chioggia, in the southern part of the lagoon. However, studies carried out by scientists after the disastrous 1966 flood in Venice and the lagoon showed that the islands reduced the area in which the tidal flow could expand and that this had an impact both on lagoon's water level and the efficiency of water turnover in the lagoon. The former has also had the consequence of worsening the aqua alta phenomenon (high water, the floods which can occur in Venice and the lagoon with above average high tides). As a result, the expansion works were suspended in 1969 and the plan was scrapped in 1973.

To try to alleviate these problems a number of channels which had been filled in to create the islands were reopened to reconnect the waters behind these islands to the rest of the lagoon. These are the Volpego and Fiumesino, which cut through the cassa B, the Taglio Vecchio and Mattoni, which cut through the cassa B and the Avesa, which cuts through the cassa A.

The area of the lagoon which can absorb the tidal flow has decreased by about 30% since 1791. The "stiffening" of the gronda lagunare, which has been worsened by the creation of the artificial islands for the industrial area, and its connection with an exacerbation of the aqua alta phenomenon has also drawn attention to another factor which contributes to this "stiffening" of the gronda lagunare: the valli da pesca with fixed banks.

=== Valli da Pesca ===
The term valli da pesca (sing. valle), or just valli/valle, translates into "fishing valleys." It refers to fish farms. Although in Italian valle means valley, the term originates from the Latin word vallum, which means rampant. This term came into use centuries ago because the valli are separated from the rest of the lagoon by banks. They are located along the gronda lagunare in the southern and northern parts of the lagoon. There are 33 valli which cover c. 92 km^{2} of the waters of the lagoon (1/6, 17% of the total surface).

There are two types, valli with mobile banks and valli with fixed banks. The former was the type which was used for centuries. It started being replaced by the latter from the 19th century. Mobile banks were made of poles, reed mats and rods. In this kind of valle the inner water level was dependent on that of the water outside it. The banks were moved to open the valli to the outside waters when there was a need to raise the inner water level. Fixed banks are earthworks and the valle's water levels are regulated through rolling shutter gates. Since these valli are separated from the lagoon permanently, they keep the tide at bay. This constrains the expansion of the tidal flow and can have negative hydrologic consequences.

The authorities of the Republic of Venice understood the importance of the valli for the hydrology of the lagoon. They forbade the construction of fixed banks because they did not want any impediments to the free expansion of the tidal flow. In 1314 they issued laws regarding the fishing valli. In 1624 the valli were declared property of those who fished and their public use was barred to preserve their functionality. In 1719 the government placed boundary stones to define the boundary of the lagoon (this was known as conterminazione lagunare). This was done to define the areas subject to the Republic's laws and the ordinances issued by the water authority. After the fall of the Republic, when it was conquered by Napoleon in 1797, these laws became dead letter. In the 19th century, valli owners started to enclose their fish farms with fixed banks as an engineer indicated that it made fish farming more efficient.

In the mid-20th century, the Italian government incentivised the development of fixed banks. With the mentioned warning by scientists about the connection between the "stiffening" of the gronda lagunare and floods in the 1970s, there was a policy shift towards the opening of the valli da pesca to the expansion of the tidal flows.

== Opening of the valli da pesca and promotion of wetlands ==
A 1984 law prescribed studies and projects for works aimed at the hydrologic re-balancing of the lagoon, stopping its degradation and eliminating its causes. It made particular reference to restoring the previous depths of canals which had been dug deeper and the opening of the valli da pesca to the expansion of the tides. The latter could lead to a reduction of the aqua alta problem, particularly in the peripheral islands in the northern part of the lagoon, such as Burano and Torcello. A 2000 study by the Environment Ministry estimated that the opening of the valli could on average reduce the tidal peaks by 20.2 cm and, in the case of the island of Burano, reduce tides between 9.10 cm and nearly 10 cm.

Another problem which developed in the 20th century is the increasing silting of the lagoon's peripheral channels and canals in the areas along the gronda lagunare. The main cause of this is a diminished circulation of currents due to the "stiffening" of the gronda lagunare, including the fixed bank valli da pesca which limit the flow of the tides. This is particularly accentuated in the southern part of the lagoon because of the construction of a road on an embankment which crosses it and almost completely, blocking the tidal flow in the area to its south. Some openings along this embankment were created in 1981–82. However, the silting of the bottom and the local channels continues.

The opening of the valli da pesca can contribute to an extension of the tracts of the lagunar channels in the gronda lagunare and this can help to bring in the tidal flow to the areas at the edge of the lagoon, increasing the area which can absorb this tidal flow. It can also bring a greater water turnover in these peripheral areas of the lagoon.

A pilot project, the opening up of the Valle Figheri, in the southern part of the lagoon, which was chosen as a test case, was completed in 1999. The aim was to stop the degradation processes of the lagoon and to improve the quality of the water in the peripheral area of the lagoon where water circulation and turnover occurs with difficulty. An earthen embankment has been built to divide the valle into two parts, one of which was reopened. It has a barrier with 20 gates to regulate the flow of the tide between the open part of the valle and the lagoon. Two structures between the open part and the closed part have also been built.

After this pilot project not much progress with the opening of the valli da pesca was made. There has been a legal challenge by a firm which owns one the valli. The case was first heard in 2004 by a court in Venice. It went before the European Court of Human Rights in 2014 and the authorities lost the case. There was an out of court settlement in 2017.

The opening of the valli da pesca can also be of great value for the regeneration of the gronda lagunare areas by restoring it as a transition belt with the formation of wetlands and reed beds. In the past 50–60 years there has been an increased appreciation of the value and benefits of wetlands and reed beds. These can improve the geomorphology of the gronda lagunare and also its ecology as they provide an ideal habitat for diverse fauna and flora.

The Ramsar Convention on Wetlands underlines the ecologic and economic value of wetlands. It notes that wetlands ecosystems can have some of the highest ecosystem service values compared to other ecosystems due to their importance in clean water provision, natural hazards mitigation and carbon storage. A large proportion of the values come from their water-related services. Of particular value to the Lagoon of Venice are:

- Coastal protection by attenuating and/or dissipating waves and by buffering winds, thus regulating floods and the impact of storms
- Erosion control by providing sediment stabilisation and soil retention, thus contributing to land formation and increasing resilience to storms
- Flood protection by regulating and controlling water flows
- Phytodepuration (the natural treatment of surface water by natural purification processes through bacteria on the roots of plants) by providing nutrient and pollution uptake and retention and particle deposition. The nutrients in question are nitrogen or phosphate from fertilisers which can cause eutrophication.
- Carbon sequestration by generating biological productivity and diversity
- Tourism, recreation, education and research by providing a unique and aesthetic landscape and a suitable habitat for diverse fauna and flora
- Cultural, spiritual and religious benefits, bequest values through the cultural, historic or spiritual meaning of this unique environment

Thirty-nine hectares of phytodepuration wetlands have been created along the gronda lagunare to restore its water purification capacity and the environmental characteristics of the gronda lagunare, which used to have woods, ponds, marches and freshwater wetlands. They have been created by the river mouths along the lagoon to reconstruct wetland areas which act as a transition between the mainland and the lagoon where aquatic and non-aquatic plants and various communities of organisms absorb in a natural way the large quantities of nitrogen and phosphate which would otherwise be introduced into the lagoon. The elimination of pollutants occurs in the sedimentary basins, especially in the surface area. These transitional wetlands are needed to ensure that the lagunar system has the capacity to deal with rising water events and peaks in pollution loads, maintaining its purification efficacy.

== See also ==
- Venetian Lagoon
