= San Francesco del Deserto =

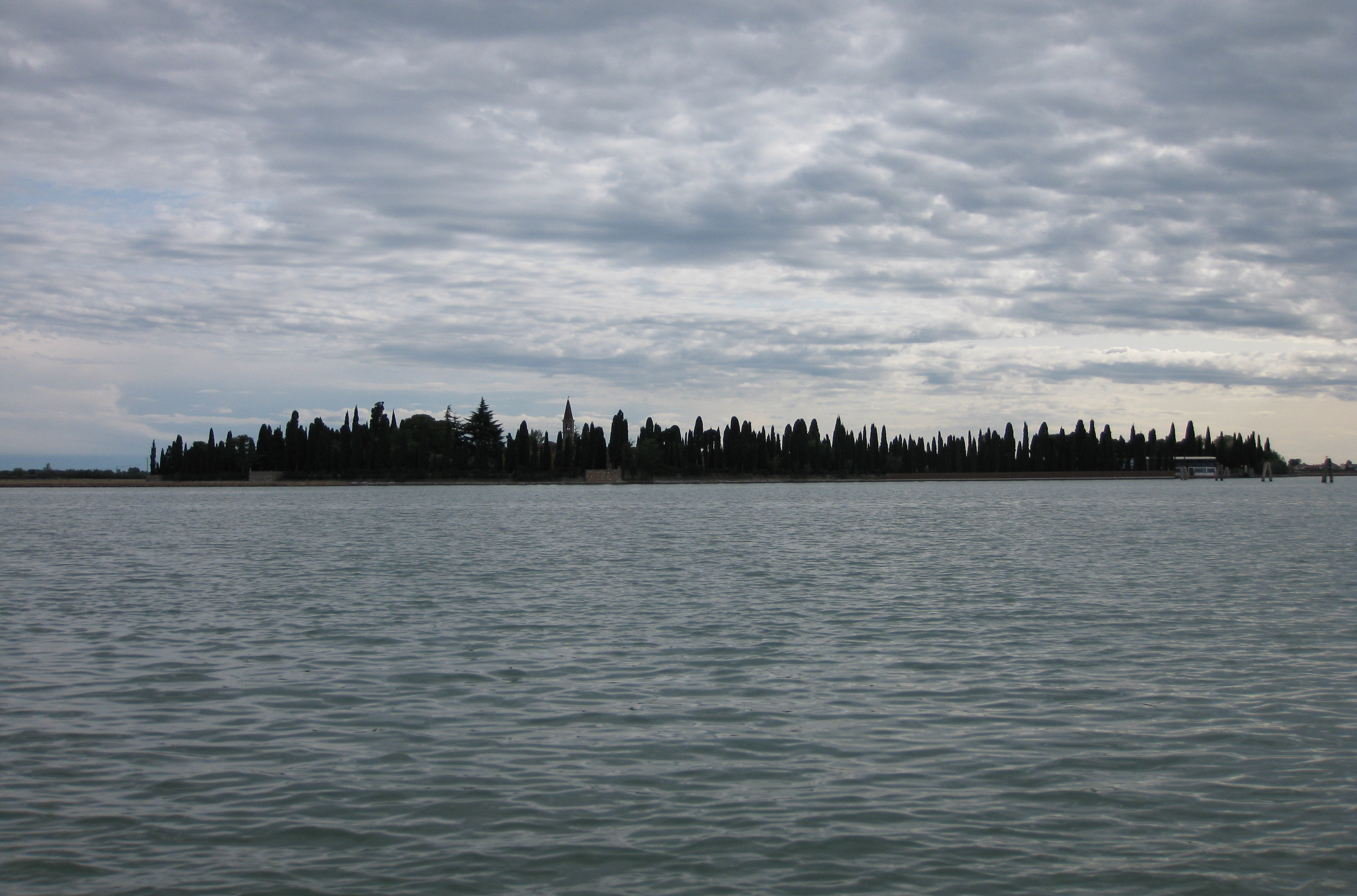
- San Francesco del Deserto

- Location within Venetian Lagoon

Geography
- Coordinates: 45.4731°N 12.4169°E
- Adjacent to: Venetian Lagoon

Administration
- Italy
- Region: Veneto
- Province: Province of Venice

San Francesco del Deserto is an island in the Venetian Lagoon in Veneto, Italy, with a surface of some 4 ha. It is located between Sant'Erasmo and Burano. It houses a Franciscan monastery.

== History ==
The island was frequented since Roman times. In 1220, St. Francis landed here at his return from the Holy Land during the Fifth Crusade, and founded a hermitage here. After his death, the island was given to the Minorites by the Venetian patrician Jacopo Michiel, a relative of the patriarch of Grado, Angelo Barozzi, to found a monastery.

During the Austrian rule of Venice, the island, abandoned due to its unhealthy characteristics, was used as a powder depot. In 1858 it was donated to the diocese of Venice, who allowed the friars to refound a monastery here.
