= Sant'Elena (island) =

Island in Venice, Italy

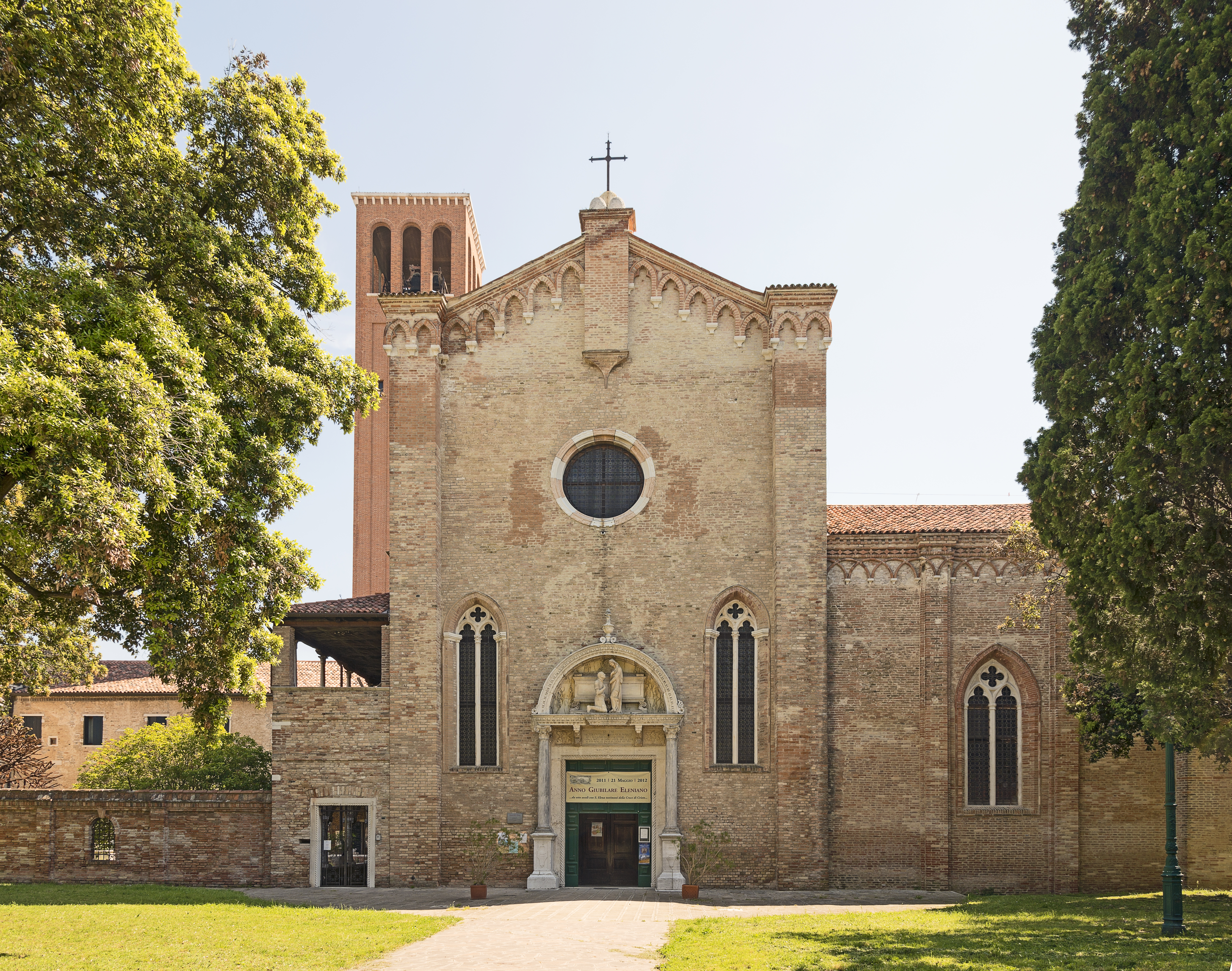
- The Church of Sant'Elena

- Location within Venetian Lagoon

Geography
- Coordinates: 45.427222°N 12.365°E
- Adjacent to: Venetian Lagoon

Administration
- Italy
- Region: Veneto
- Province: Province of Venice

Sant'Elena is an island of Venice. It lies at the eastern tip of the main island group and forms part of the sestiere of Castello. The original island was separated by an arm of the Venetian Lagoon from Venice itself and was centered on the Church of Sant'Elena and its monastery, originally built in the twelfth century and rebuilt in the 15th.

In the 1920s, the island was expanded to fill in the gap; it is linked to the rest of the city by three bridges. It includes the Rimembranze Park, a naval college and a football stadium, Stadio Pier Luigi Penzo, in addition to residential areas and Venice Bienniale buildings.

The belltower has a ring of 6 bells in B rung with the Veronese bellringing art.

== Gallery ==
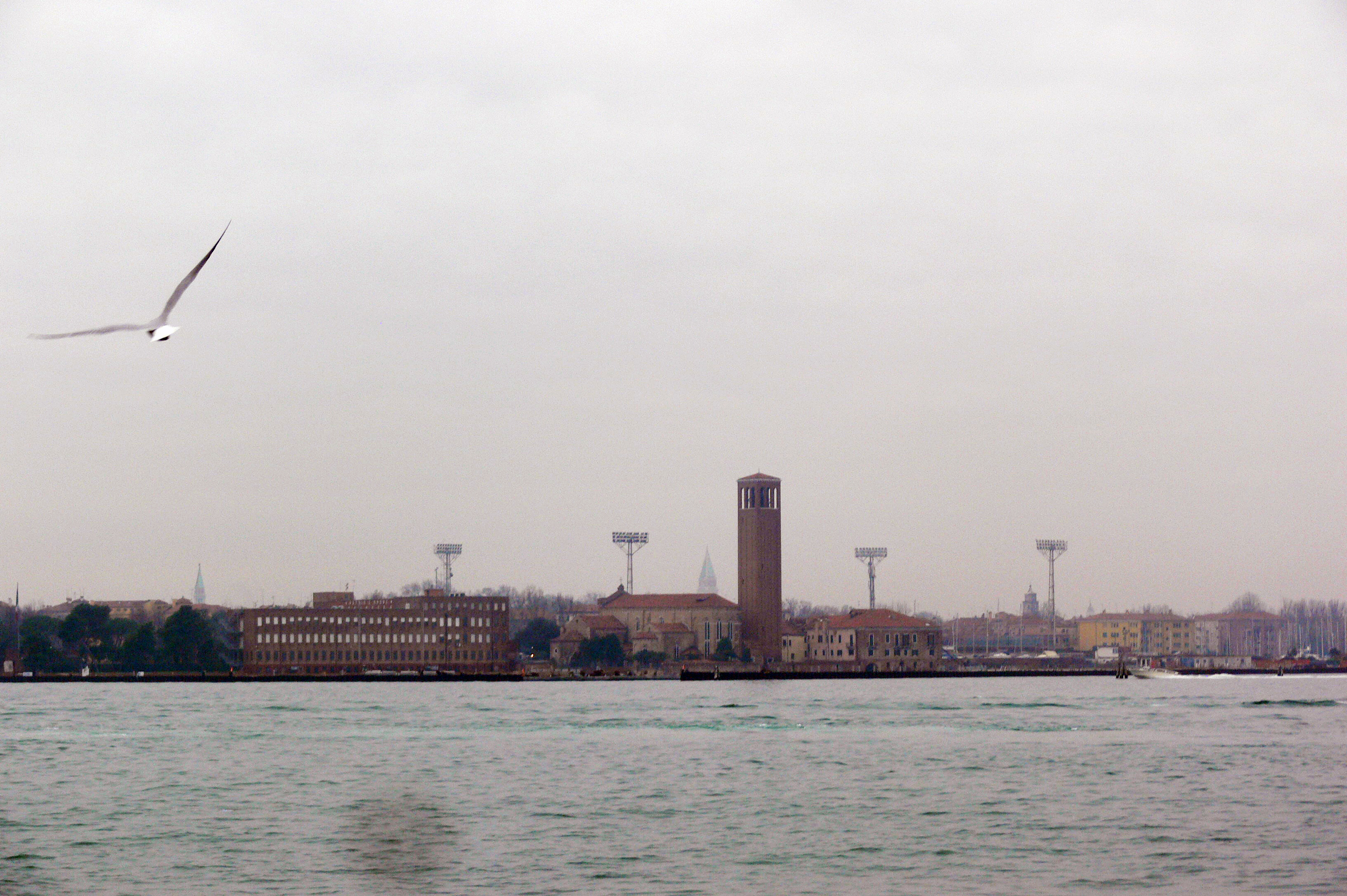
Sant'Elena from Lido

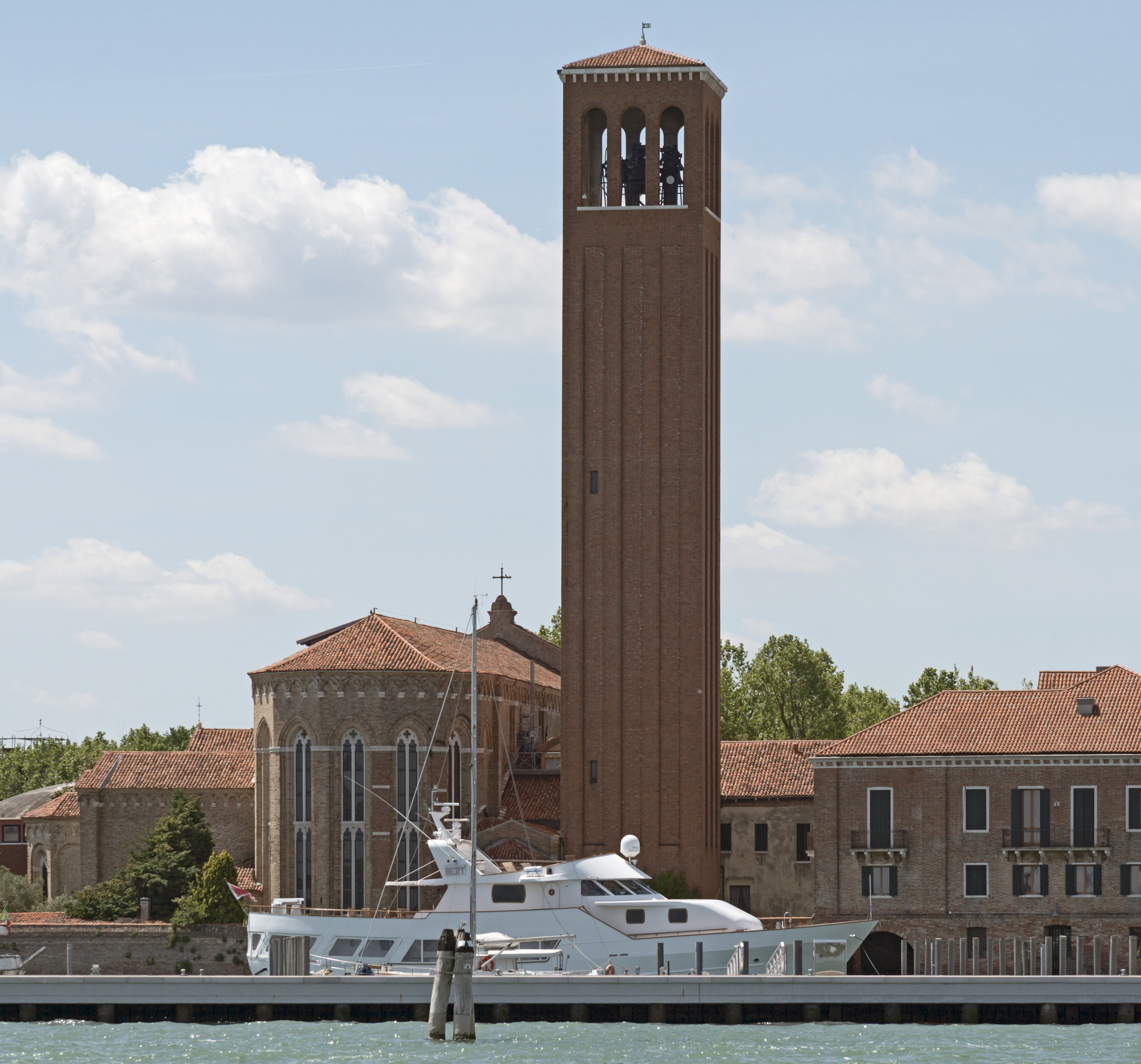
Apse and tower from a vaporetto

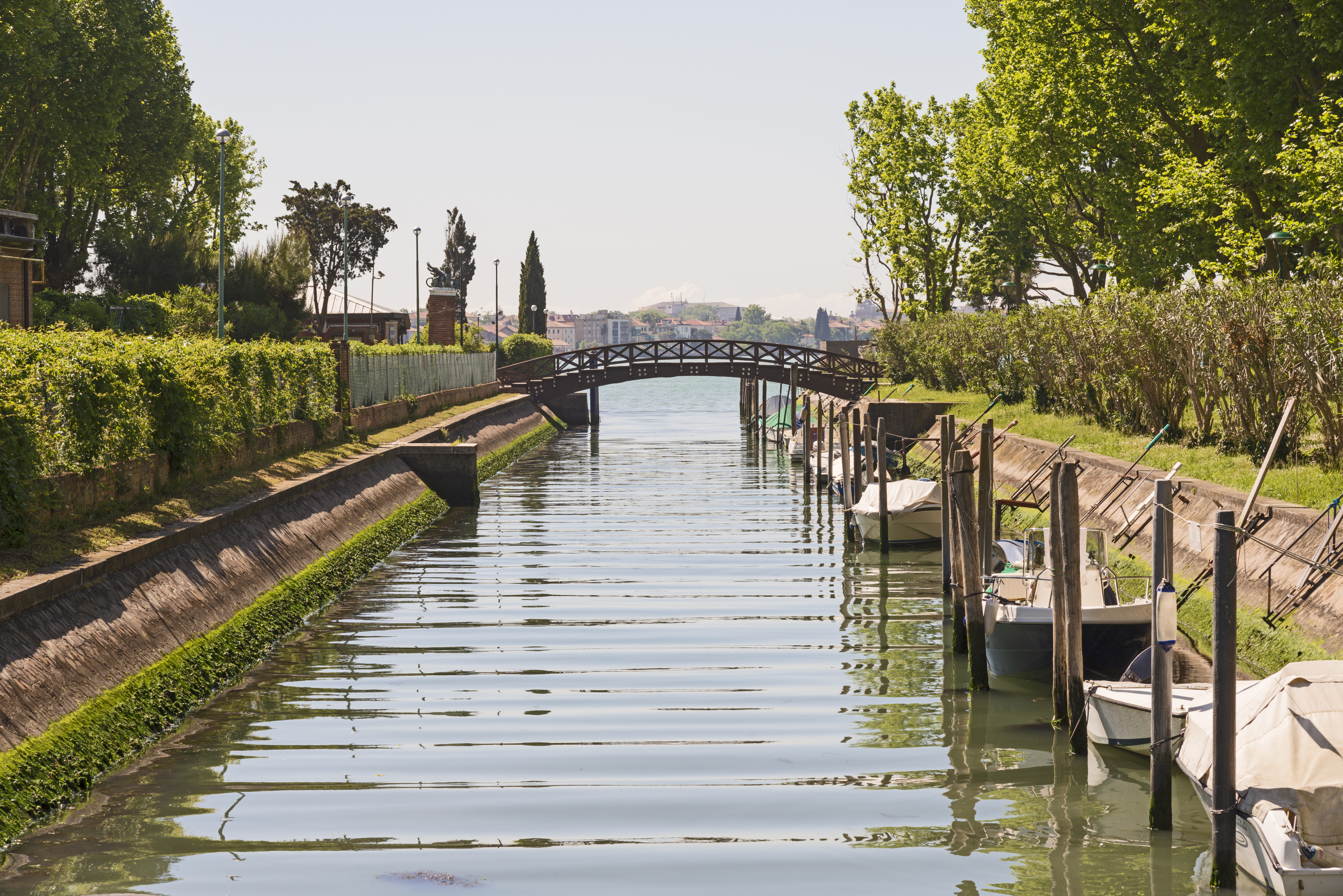
Rio Sant'Elena and bridge

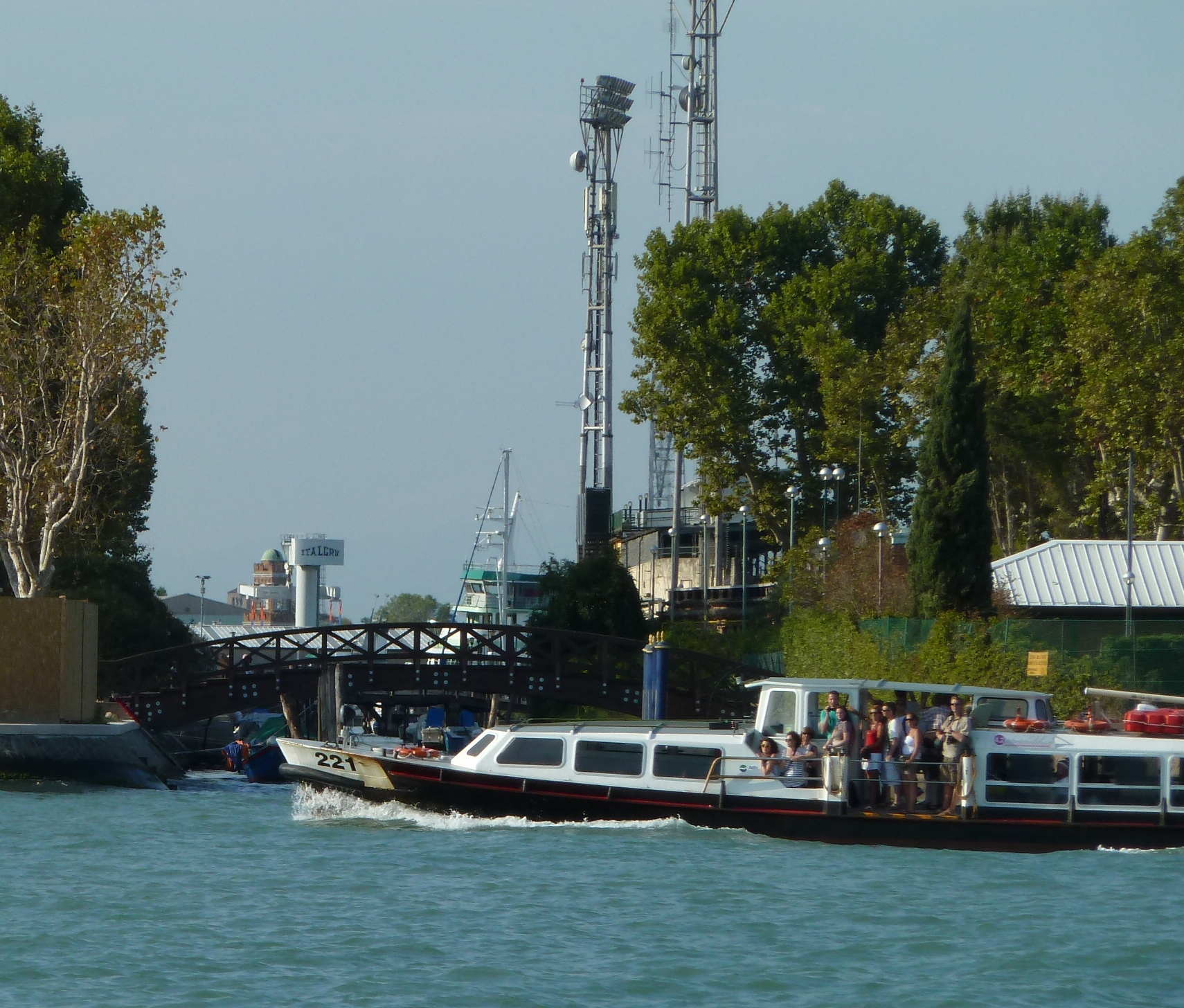
Rio Sant'Elena

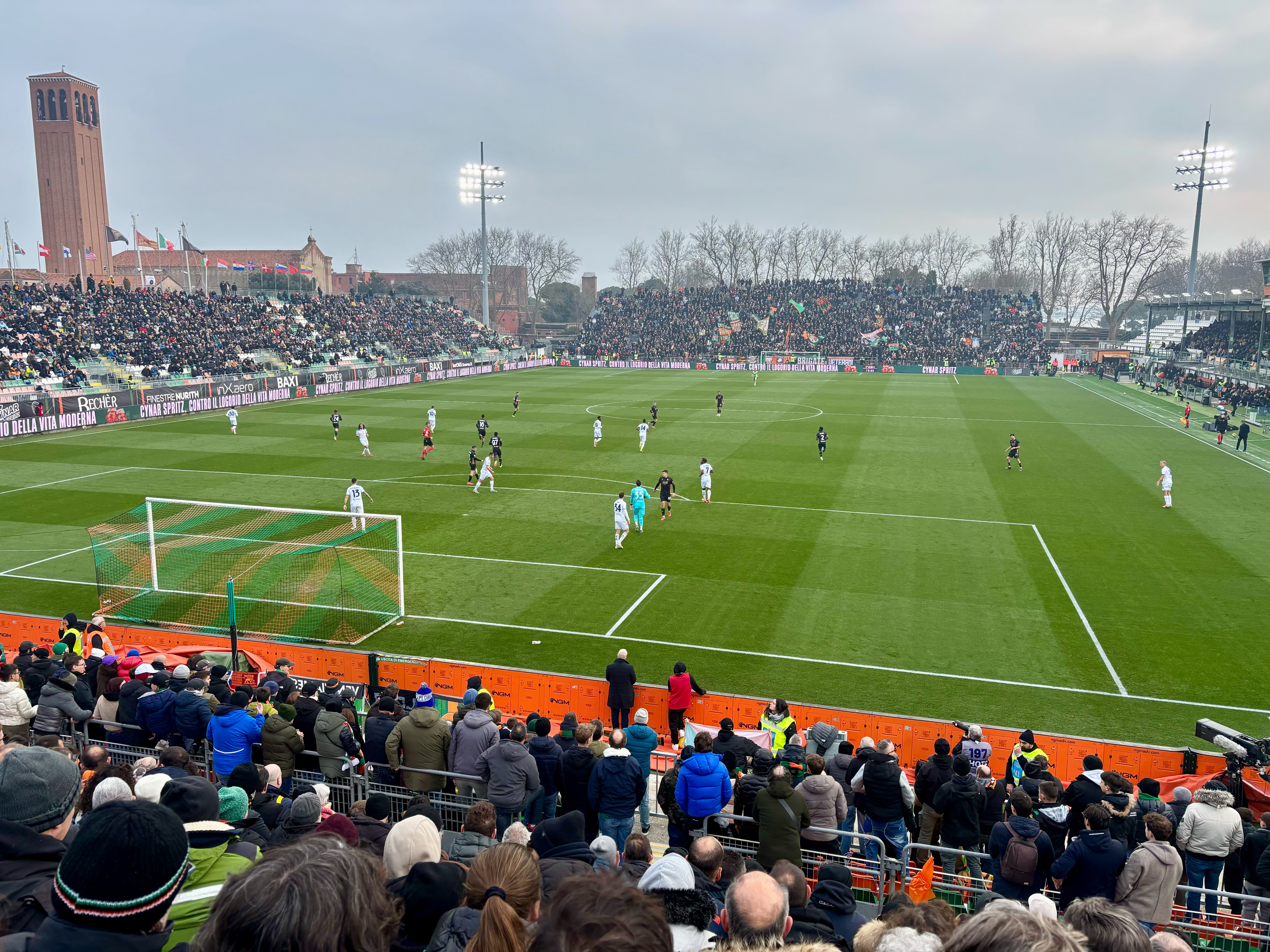
Stadio Pier Luigi Penzo
