= Lazzaretto Vecchio =

Former hospital in Venice, Italy

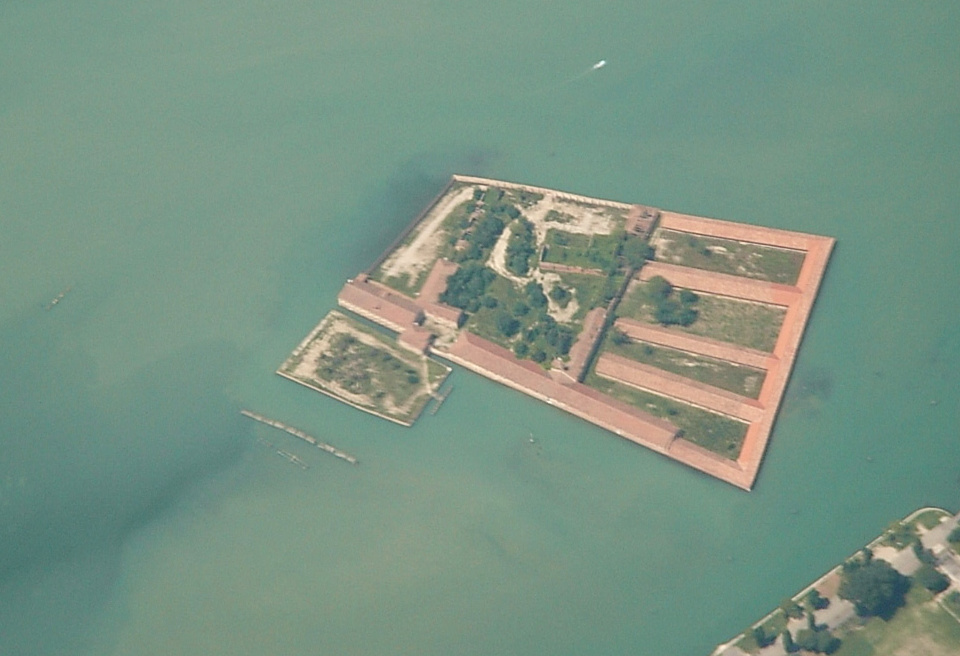
- Aerial view of Lazzaretto Vecchio

- Location in the Venetian Lagoon

Geography
- Coordinates: 45.406193°N 12.359490°E
- Adjacent to: Venetian Lagoon
- Area: 2.53 ha (6.3 acres)

Administration
- Italy
- Region: Veneto
- Province: Province of Venice

The Lazzaretto Vecchio ("Old Lazaret"), formerly known as Santa Maria di Nazareth ("Holy Mary of Nazareth"), is an island of the Venetian Lagoon, northern Italy, located near the Lido of Venice. Between 1403 and 1630, it housed a hospital which cared for people during the plague epidemics and served as a leper colony, giving rise to the English words lazaret and lazaretto. It was later used, as were other islands, as a military post. It covers an area of 2.53 hectares (6.3 acres).

== Founding ==
The island Lazzaretto Vecchio was initially settled in the 13th century by a monastic community serving as a secluded location for prayer as well as a checkpoint for Holy Land pilgrims. The earliest date of the island's occupation can be archaeologically dated to 1249, when the Bishop of Castello laid the first stone to build the church Santa Maria di Nazareth. However, historians believe that the island may have been settled earlier by other friars who did not build permanent residences. Upon Venice's plague outbreak of 1423 Doge Francesco Foscari hired the Signori di Notte, a Venetian group who kept track of crime statistics, to record the daily number of plague deaths in Venice and report it to the Signoria. When the daily death toll exceeded 40 deaths per day, Foscari proposed a policy to the Senate that disallowed the entry of foreigners from infected regions into Venice and sought to establish a quarantine hospital. The policy was accepted and implemented by the Signoria. The outcome of this proposal was the conversion of the island of Santa Maria di Nazareth into a place of quarantine to insulate Venice from the plague, and the conversion of the island's church (also called Santa Maria di Nazareth) into a hospital for plague victims. Despite the significance of Lazzaretto Vecchio, it was not the first instance of organized quarantine on an island. The first lazaret-style quarantine was done by the Republic of Ragusa, which delegated 3 islands to quarantine foreigners from infected places for 30 days before their entrance into the city-state in 1377.

== Medical History ==
At the time of its founding in October 1423, Lazzaretto Vecchio was possibly the only quarantine centre in the world and had a strict and detailed process to quarantine goods and people before they entered Venice. Upon arrival, ships and cargo were scrubbed and fumigated while crew members were mandated to stay on the island for 40 days (a length of time inspired by scripture) before entering the mainland. The system of quarantine required a strong Venetian naval presence to surround the island and prevent captains and crew members from escaping. Lazzaretto Vecchio also had a strict and detailed structure to prevent persons at different stages of quarantine from interacting with each other. In addition to quarantining foreign crews with potentially uninfected members before their entrance into Venice, the church Santa Maria di Nazareth was converted into a hospital that provided care for Venetians and foreigners attempting to enter Venice who had contracted the plague. The structure and layout of the church made it well suited for an easy conversion into a hospital. The building already contained many private bedrooms and amenities used by friars who had stayed in the church for long periods of time. The conversion was completed, and the hospital began full operation in January 1424. While the church's structure led to an easy and inexpensive conversion, the facility required expansion as the plague continued, and in 1429, 80 more rooms were added to the hospital. Also, with the rapid growth of plague infections, another Venetian lazaret called Lazzaretto Nuovo was founded and assumed the responsibility of quarantining incoming crews before their entrance into Venice, leaving Lazzaretto Vecchio to solely be used as a hospital for Venetians with the plague.

== Effectiveness ==
Modern science and medicine reveal flaws in the Venetian system of plague prevention; additionally, there were two plague outbreaks in Venice after Lazzaretto Vecchio's construction (1575 and 1630). However, the system used at Lazzaretto Vecchio was partially effective, as the 40-day quarantine was long enough for most fleas brought to the island by travellers to die before their carrier had entered the city. The 40-day quarantine time also surpassed the incubation period for the plague, which was only 2-6 days.

== Archeology ==
Since 2004, archaeologists have unearthed more than 1500 skeletons of plague victims buried here between the 15th and 17th centuries. These have been found in individuals as well as in mass graves. The remains of thousands more are expected still to be found on the small island, as the death toll reportedly reached 500 per day in the 16th century.

== Gallery ==
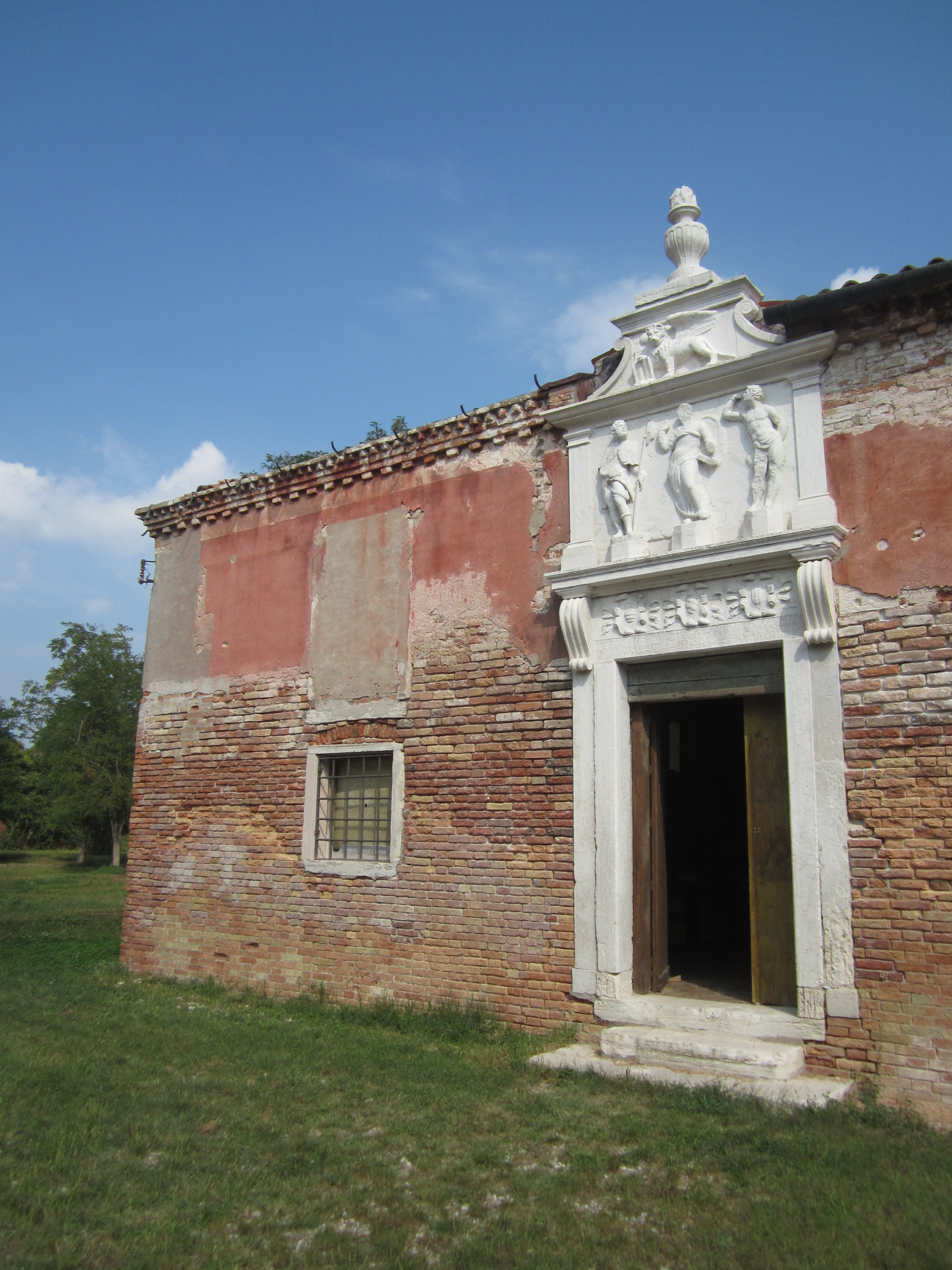
Main entrance

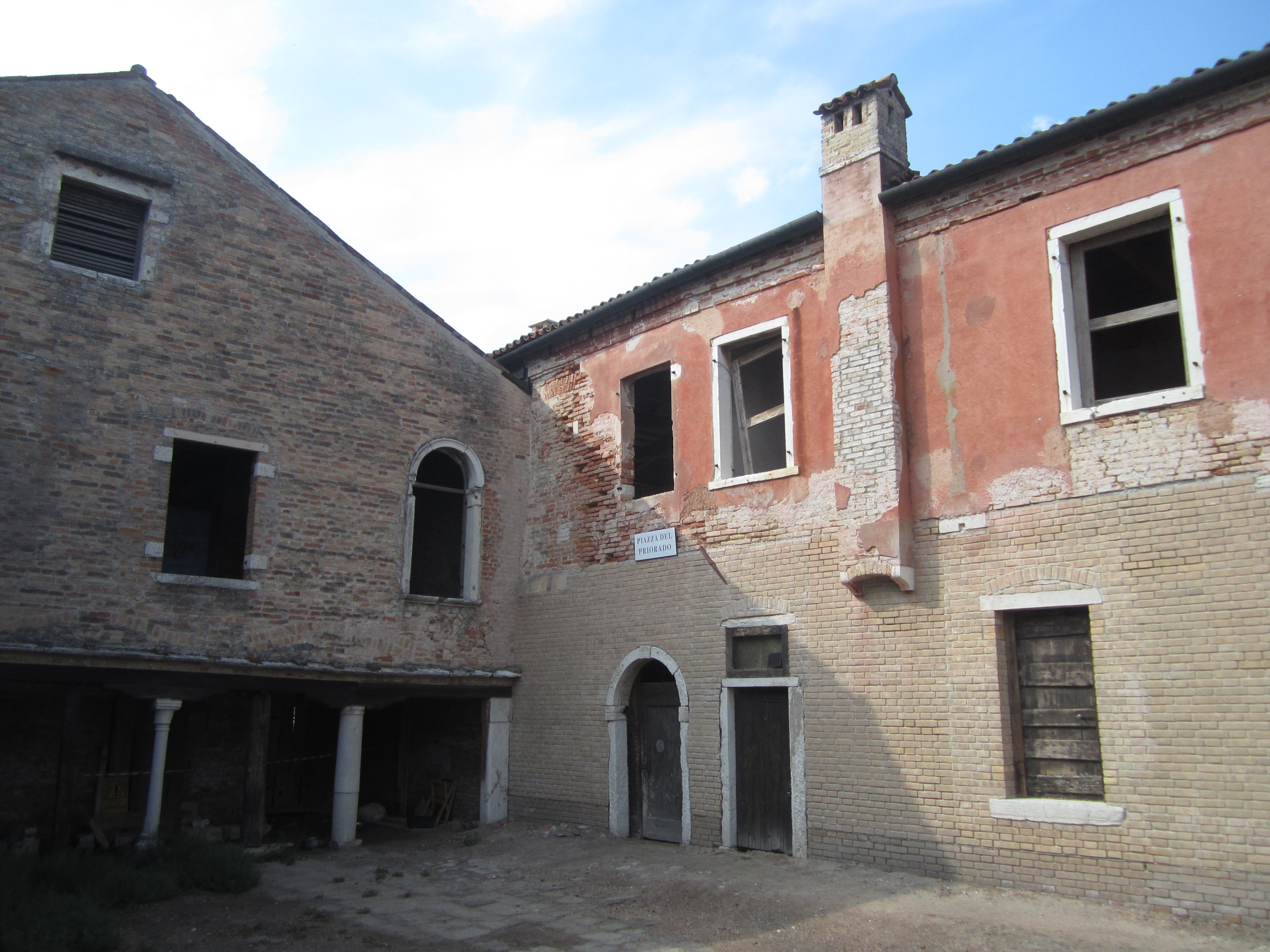
The staff building

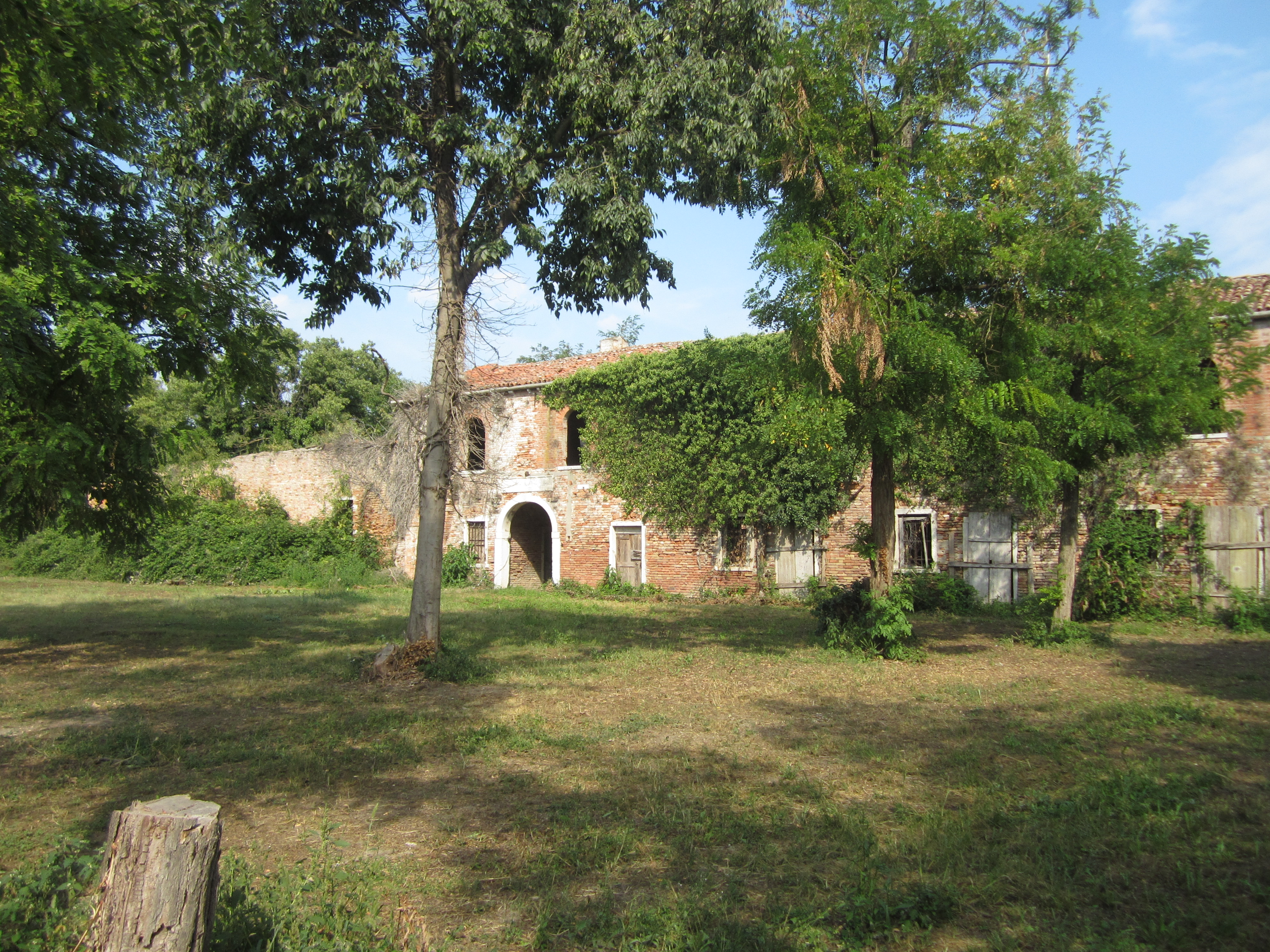
Panorama of the Lazzaretto buildings

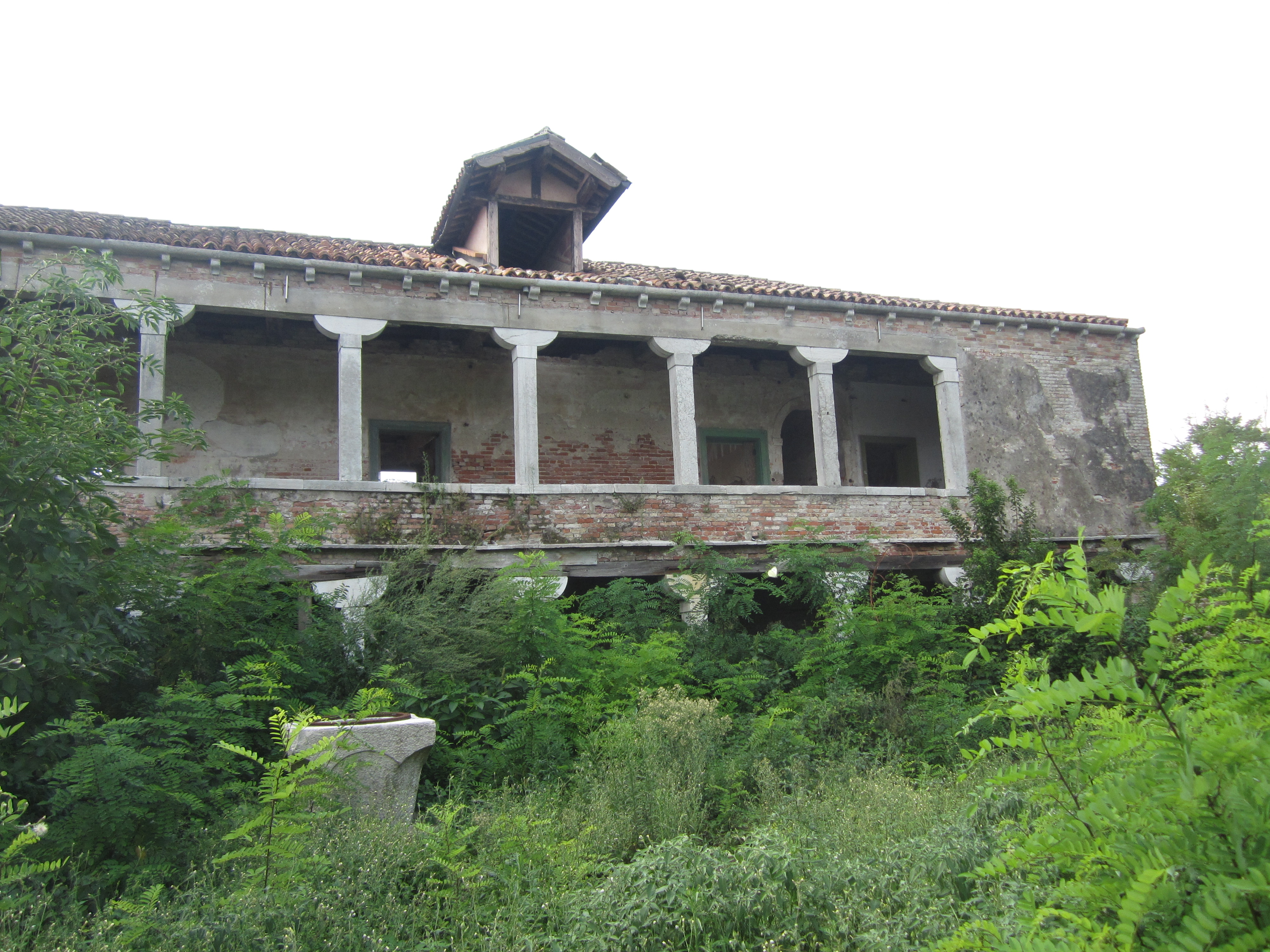
The hospital for the nobles

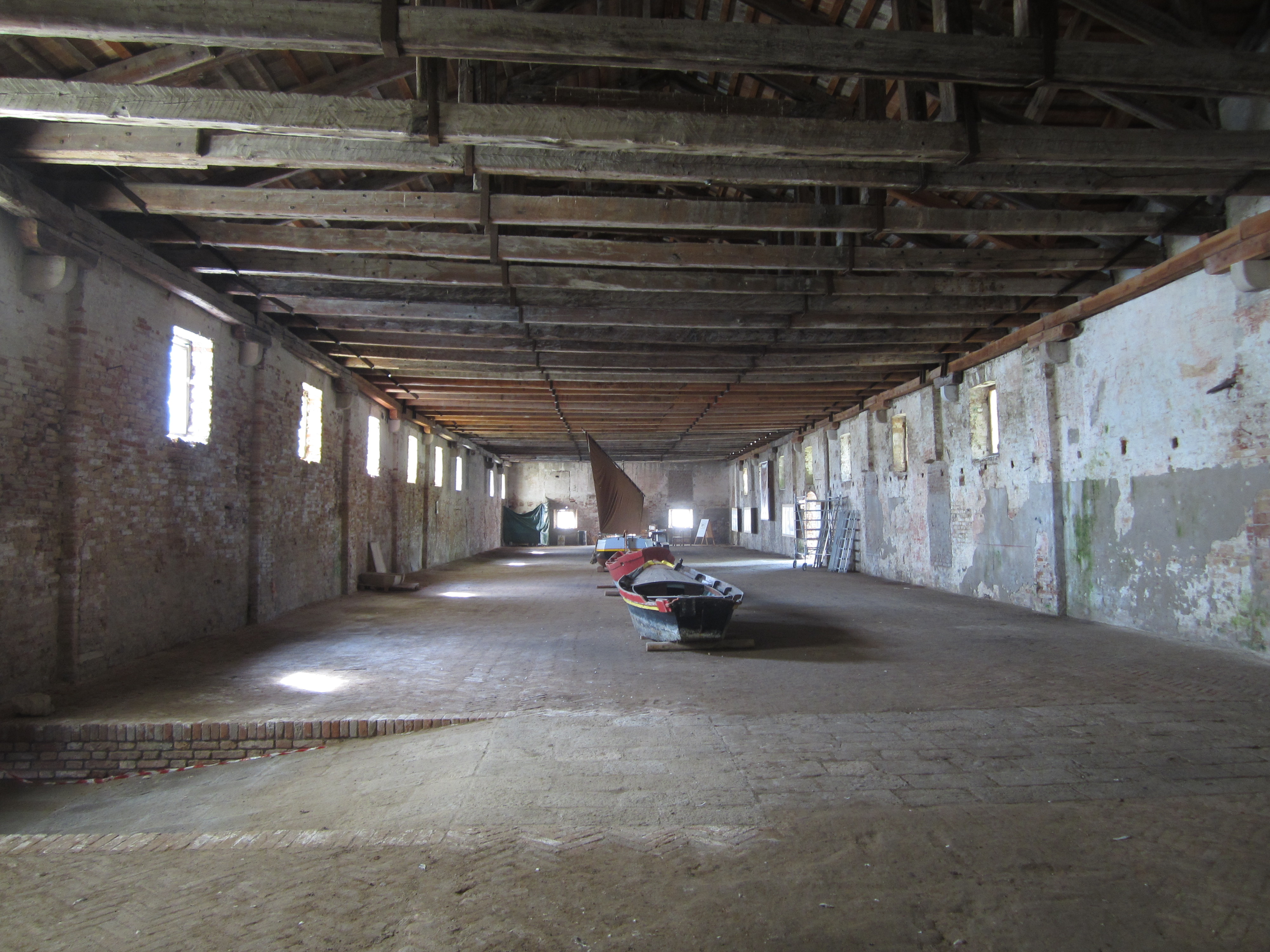
Inside one of the galleries

== See also ==
- Lazaretto
- Lazzaretto of Ancona
- Leper Colony
