= Stari Ulcinj =

Small island in the Adriatic Sea

Old Ulcinj
Native name: Stari Ulcinj Ishulli Ulqini i Vjetër
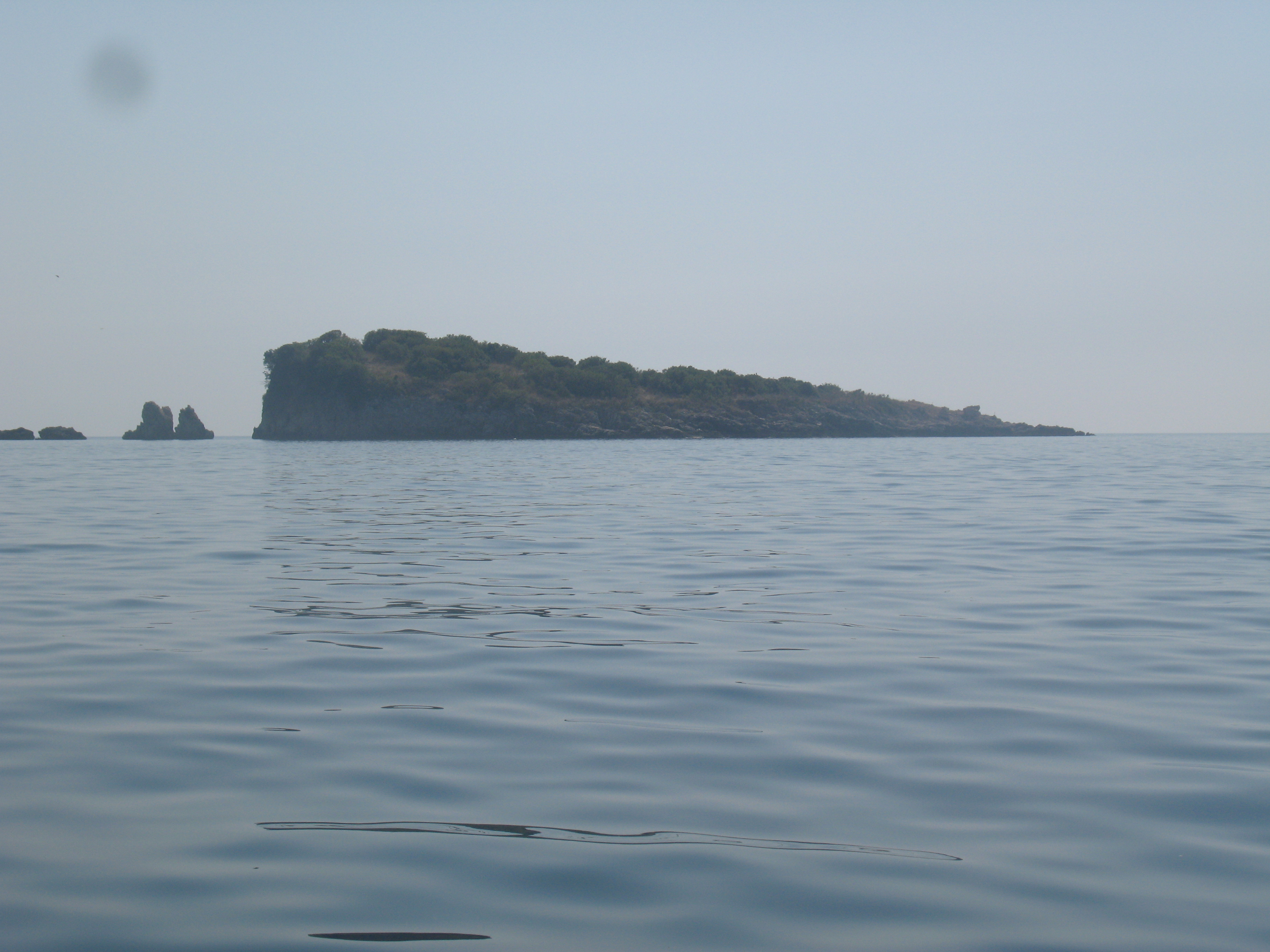
- Old Ulcinj as seen from North.
- Interactive map of Old Ulcinj

Geography
- Location: Ulcinj Municipality, Montenegro
- Coordinates: 41°59′33″N 19°08′23″E
- Total islands: 2
- Area: 0.007 sq mi (0.018 km^{2})

Stari Ulcinj (Albanian: Ulqini i Vjetër) is a small island in the Adriatic Sea located in the south of Montenegro, in Ulcinj Municipality.

== Description ==
Stari Ulcinj is a small rocky island in the Ulcinj Municipality with an area of 1.8 hectares, much smaller than the other island of Ulcinj Municipality Ada Bojana. The island is about 150 meters from the coast. It has no civilian population and is used for tourism.
