= Venetian Lagoon =

Enclosed bay in which the city of Venice is situated

- Venice Lagoon; Lagoon of Venice
- Laguna di Venezia / Laguna veneta (Italian); Łaguna de Venesia / Łaguna vèneta (Venetian)
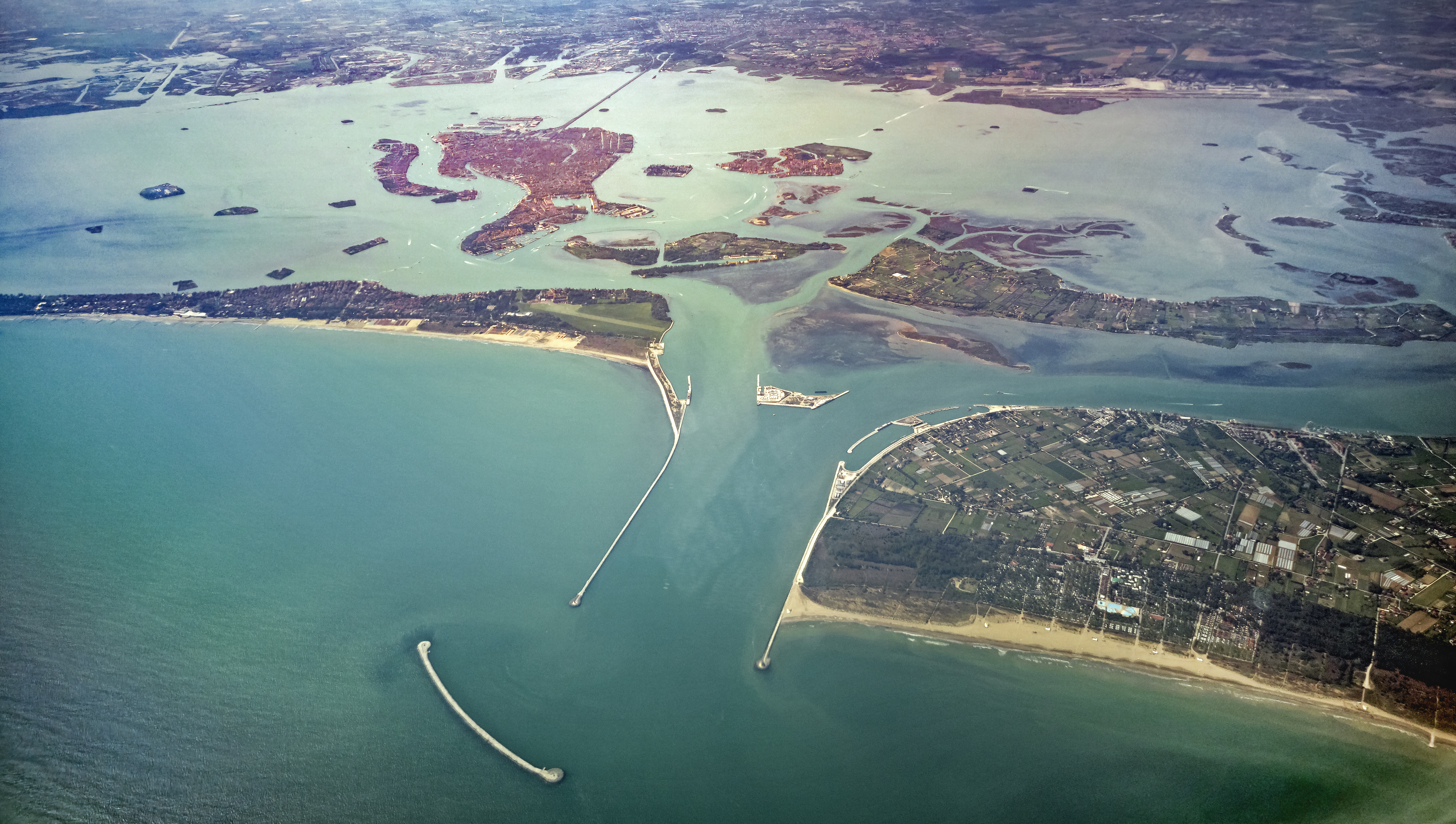
- Aerial view of the Venetian Lagoon, showing many of the islands including Venice itself, center rear, with the bridge to the mainland

- Location within Venetian Lagoon
- Location: Venice, Veneto, Italy
- Coordinates: 45°24′47″N 12°17′50″E
- Primary outflows: Adriatic Sea
- Basin countries: Italy
- Surface area: 550 square kilometres (210 sq mi)
- Average depth: 1.2 metres (3 ft 11 in)
- Max. depth: 21.5 metres (71 ft)
- Surface elevation: 3 m (9.8 ft)
- Settlements: Venice, Campagna Lupia, Cavallino-Treporti, Chioggia, Codevigo, Jesolo, Mira, Musile di Piave, Quarto d'Altino, San Donà di Piave

Ramsar Wetland
- Official name: Laguna di Venezia: Valle Averto
- Designated: 11 April 1989
- Reference no.: 423

The Venetian Lagoon, also Venice Lagoon or Lagoon of Venice, (Note: Italian: Laguna di Venezia or Laguna veneta; Venetian: Łaguna de Venesia or Łaguna vèneta.) is an enclosed bay of the Adriatic Sea, in northern Italy, in which the city of Venice is situated. Its name, from a Venetian derivative of Latin lacus 'lake', has become the generalized English term for any enclosed, shallow embayment of salt water – a lagoon.

== Location ==
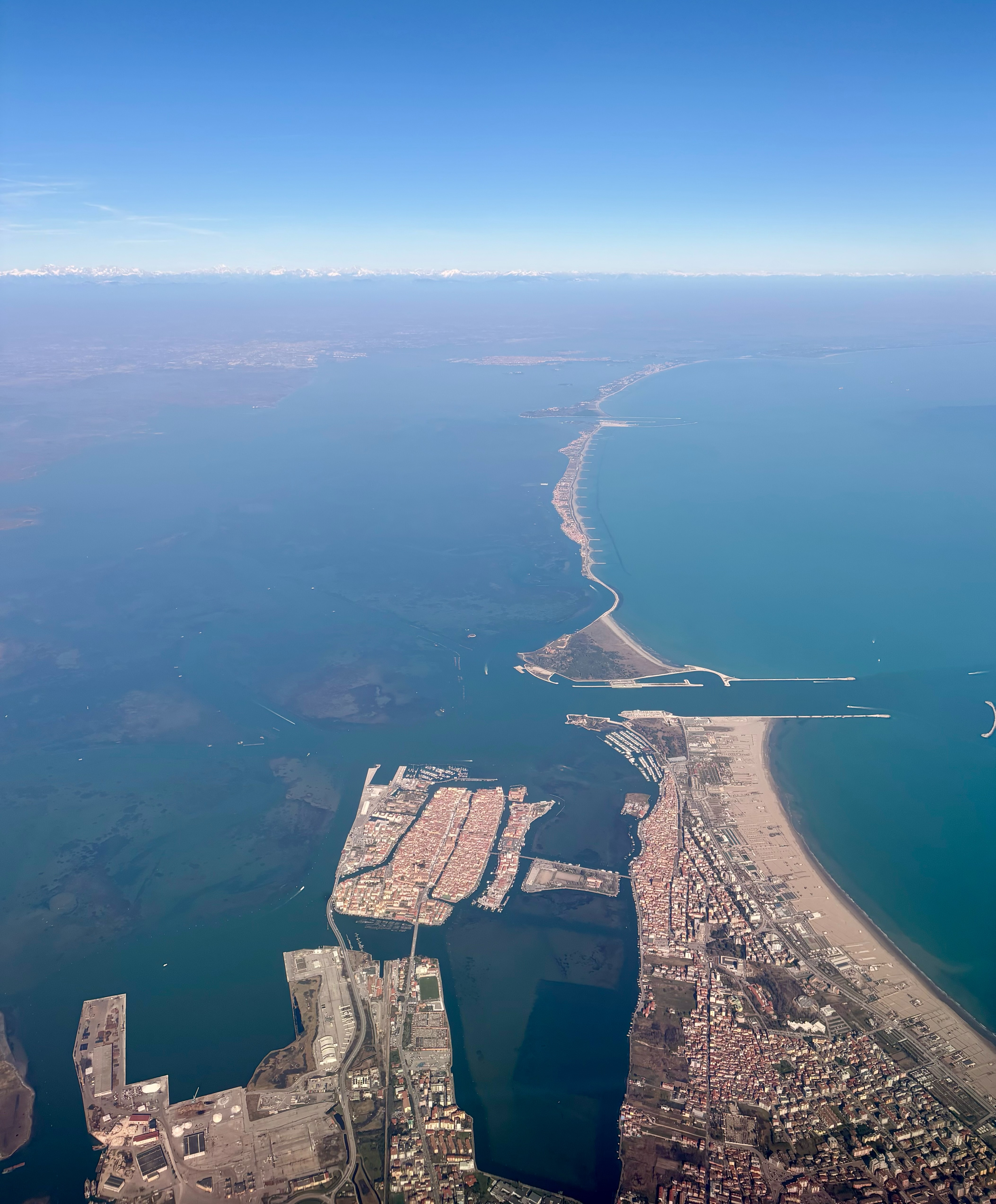
Aerial view of Chioggia and the barrier islands of the Venetian Lagoon

The Venetian Lagoon stretches from the River Sile in the north to the Brenta in the south, with a surface area of around 550 square kilometres (212 square miles). It is around 8% land, including Venice itself and many smaller islands. About 11% is permanently covered by open water, or canals, as the network of dredged channels is called, while around 80% consists of mud flats, tidal shallows and salt marshes. The Lagoon is the largest wetland in the Mediterranean Basin.

It is connected to the Adriatic Sea by three inlets: Lido, Malamocco and Chioggia. Situated at one end of a largely enclosed sea, the lagoon is subject to large variations in its water level. The most extreme are the spring tides known as the acqua alta (Italian for "high water"), which regularly flood much of Venice.

The nearby Marano-Grado Lagoon, with a surface area of around 160 square kilometres (62 square miles), is the northernmost lagoon in the Adriatic Sea and is sometimes called the "twin sister of the Venice lagoon".

== Development ==
The Lagoon of Venice is the most important survivor of a system of estuarine lagoons that in Roman times extended from Ravenna north to Trieste. In the fifth and sixth centuries, the Lagoon gave security to Romanised people fleeing invaders (mostly the Huns and the Lombards). Later, it provided naturally protected conditions for the growth of the Venetian Republic and its maritime empire. It still provides a base for a seaport, the Venetian Arsenal, and for fishing, as well as a limited amount of hunting and the newer industry of fish farming.

The Lagoon was formed about six to seven thousand years ago, when the marine transgression following the Ice Age flooded the upper Adriatic coastal plain. (Note: This geological history follows Brambati et al. (2003).) Deposition of river sediments compensated for the sinking coastal plain, and coastwise drift from the mouth of the Po tended to form sandbars that closed tidal inlets.

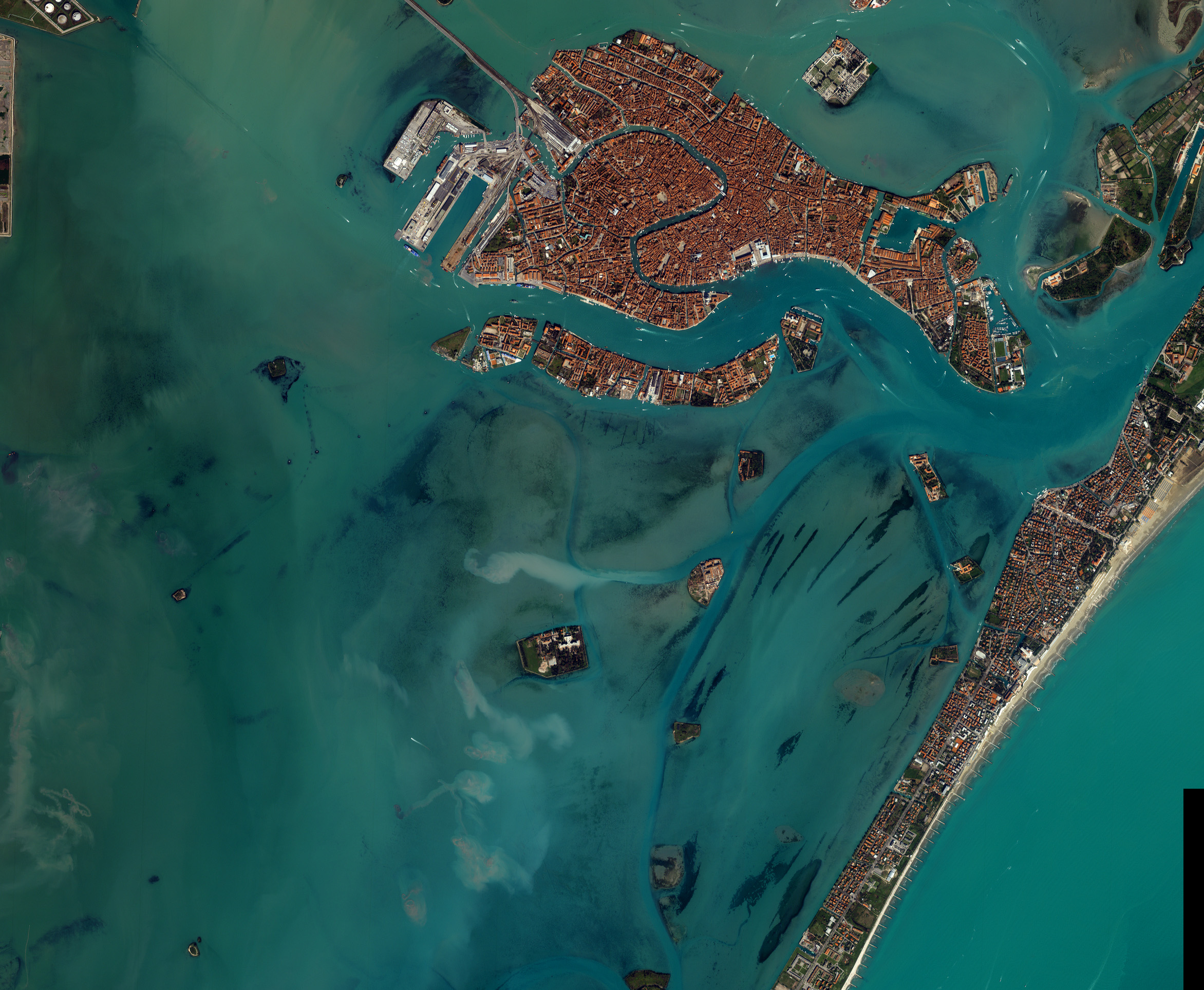
Venetian lagoon from above

The present aspect of the Lagoon is the result of human intervention. In the fifteenth and sixteenth centuries, Venetian hydraulic projects designed to prevent the lagoon from turning into a marsh reversed the natural evolution of the Lagoon. Pumping of aquifers since the nineteenth century has increased subsidence. Many of the Lagoon's islands had originally been marshy, but a gradual drainage programme rendered them habitable. Many of the smaller islands are entirely artificial, while some areas around the seaport of the Mestre are also reclaimed islands. The remaining islands—-including those of the coastal strip (Lido, Pellestrina and Treporti)—-are essentially dunes.

Venice Lagoon has been inhabited from the most ancient times, but it was only during and after the fall of the Western Roman Empire that people coming from the Venetian mainland settled in numbers large enough to found the city of Venice. Today, the main cities inside the lagoon are Venice (at the centre of it) and Chioggia (at the southern inlet); Lido di Venezia and Pellestrina are inhabited as well, but they are considered part of Venice. However, most of the inhabitants of Venice, as well as its economic core (its airport and harbour), are on the western border of the lagoon, around the former towns of Mestre and Marghera. There are also two towns at the northern end of the lagoon: Jesolo (a famous sea resort) and Cavallino-Treporti.

== Ecosystem ==
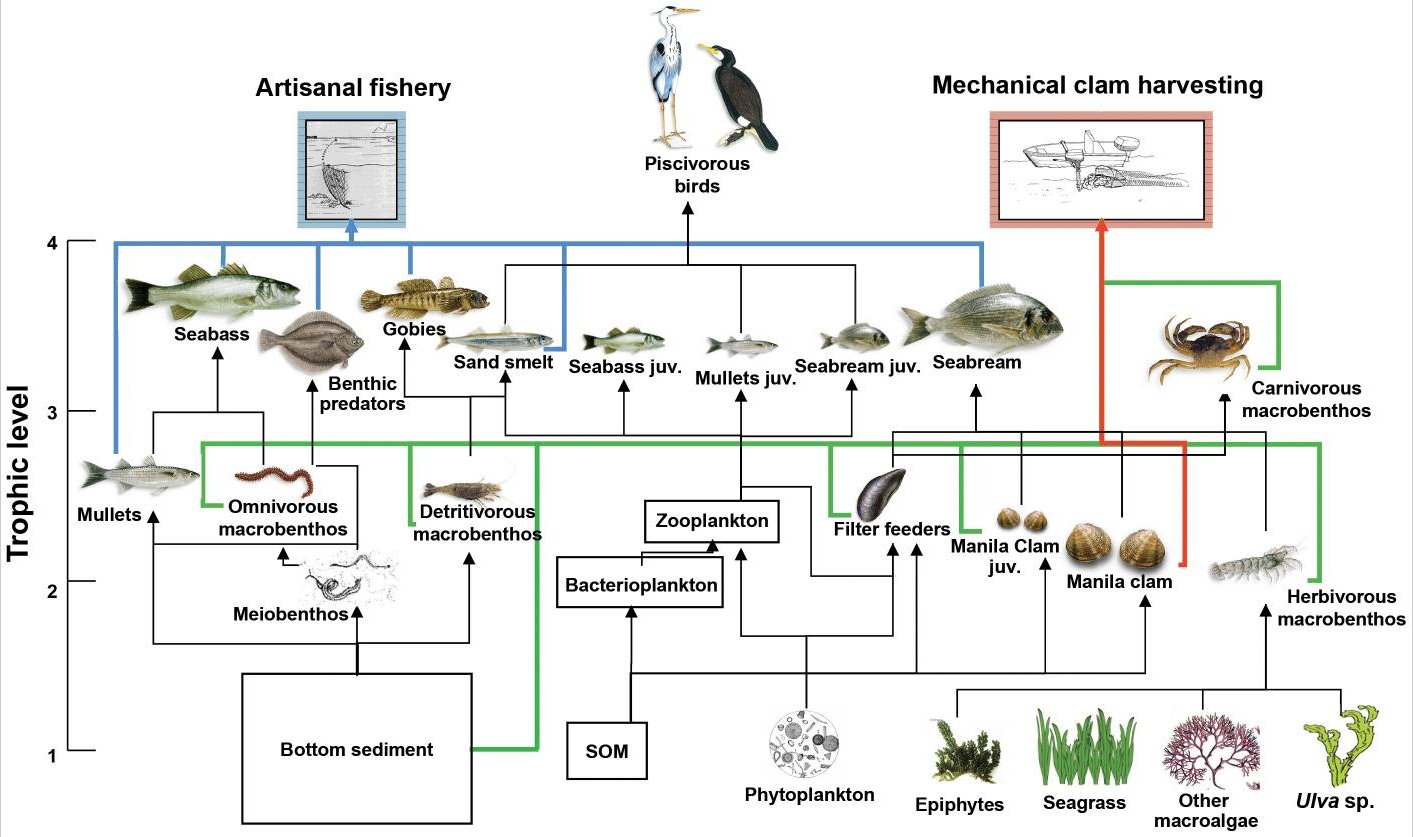
Food web diagram of the Venetian Lagoon

Bottlenose dolphins occasionally enter the lagoon, possibly for feeding.

The level of pollution in the lagoon has long been a concern. The large phytoplankton and macroalgae blooms in the late 1980s proved particularly devastating. Researchers have identified the lagoon as one of the primary areas where non-indigenous species are introduced into the Mediterranean Sea.

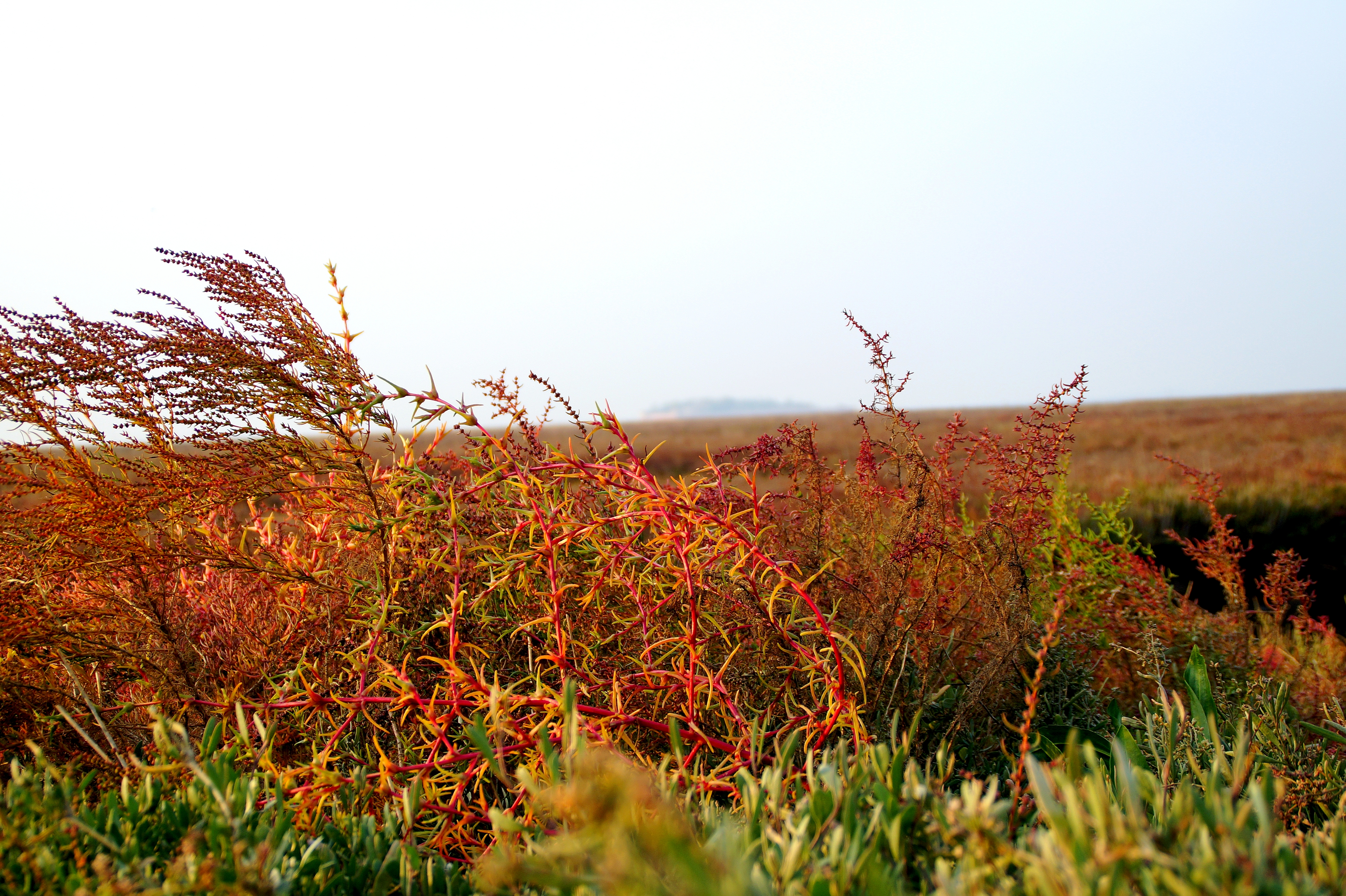
Grasses on Lazzaretto Nuovo

Cruise ships crossing the Venetian Lagoon have contributed to air pollution, surface-water pollution, decreased water quality, erosion, and loss of landscape.

From 1987 to 2003, the Venice Lagoon was harmed by a reduction in nutrient inputs and by macroalgal biomasses caused by climate change, and by changes in the concentration and distribution of nitrogen, organic phosphorus and organic carbon in the upper sediments. At the same time, however, the seagrasses started a natural process of recolonization, helping to partially restore the pristine conditions of the marine ecosystem.

== Islands ==
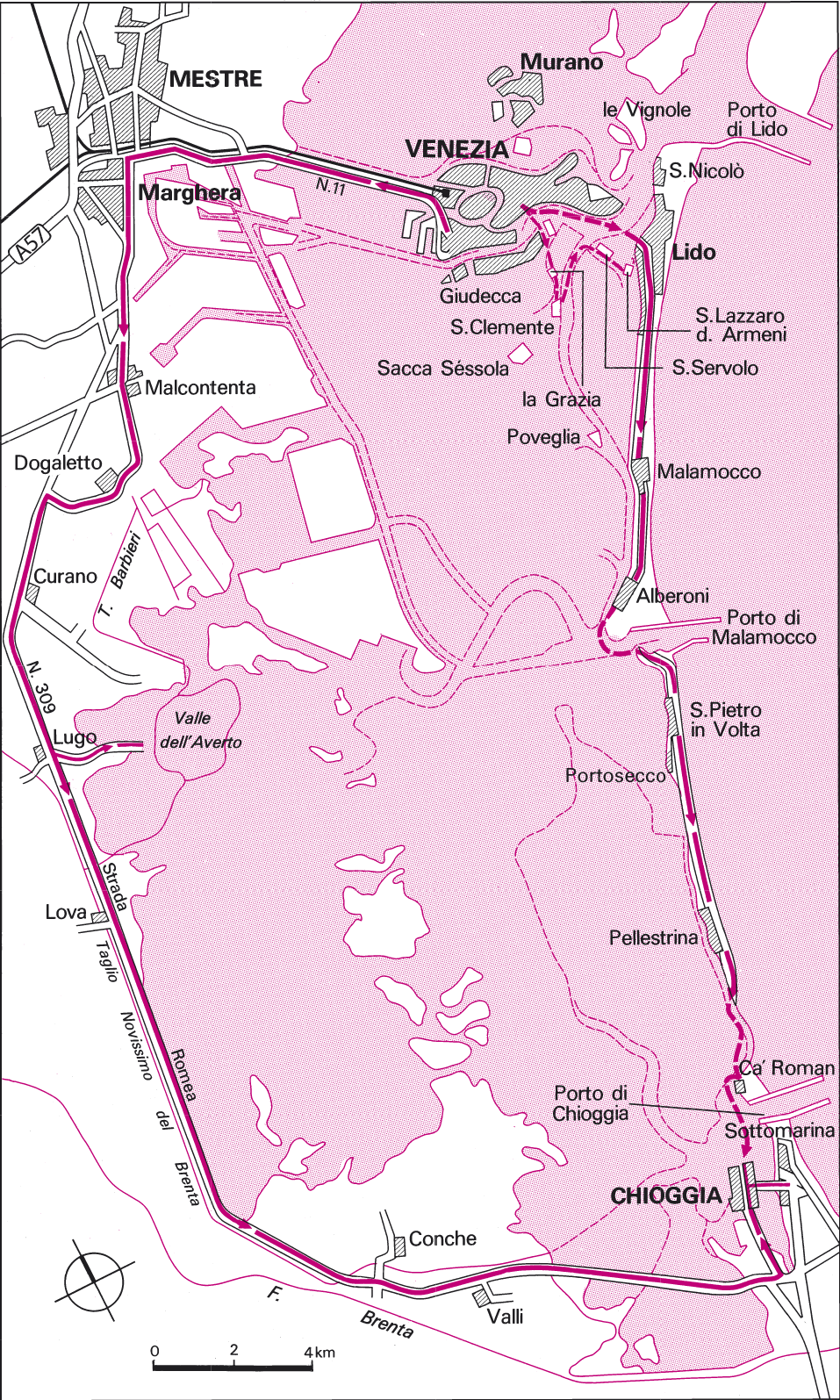
The Venetian Lagoon Islands

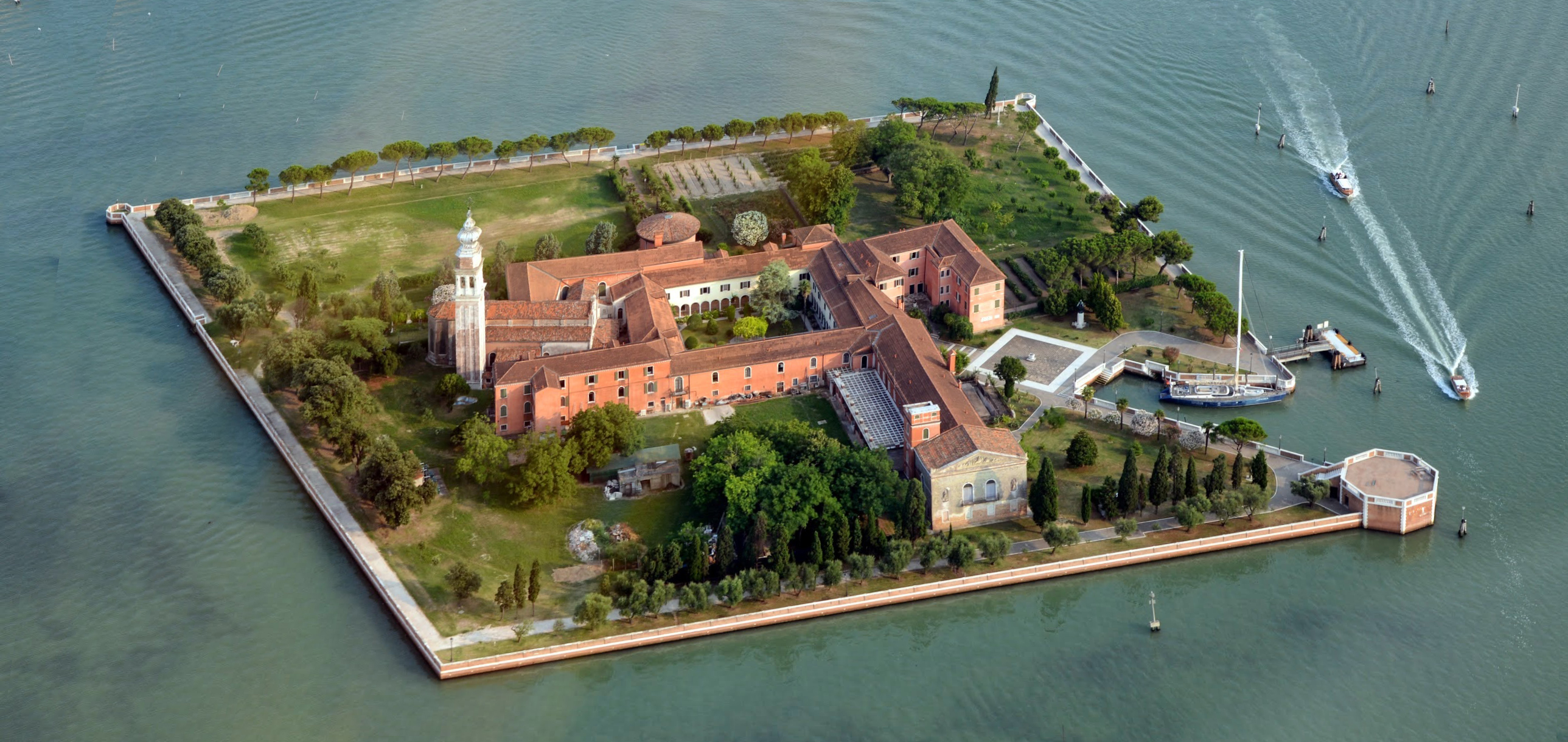
San Lazzaro degli Armeni has been an important centre of Armenian culture for around 300 years.

The Venice Lagoon is mostly included in the Metropolitan City of Venice, but the south-western area is part of the Province of Padua.

The largest islands or archipelagos by area, excluding coastal reclaimed land and the coastal barrier beaches:

- Venice 5.17 km^{2}
- Sant'Erasmo 3.26 km^{2}
- Murano 1.17 km^{2}
- Chioggia 0.67 km^{2}
- Giudecca 0.59 km^{2}
- Mazzorbo 0.52 km^{2}
- Torcello 0.44 km^{2}
- Sant'Elena 0.34 km^{2}
- La Certosa 0.24 km^{2}
- Burano 0.21 km^{2}
- Tronchetto 0.18 km^{2}
- Sacca Fisola 0.18 km^{2}
- San Michele 0.16 km^{2}
- Sacca Sessola 0.16 km^{2}
- Santa Cristina 0.13 km^{2}

Other inhabited islands include:

- Cavallino
- Lazzaretto Nuovo
- Lazzaretto Vecchio
- Lido
- Pellestrina
- Poveglia
- San Clemente
- San Francesco del Deserto
- San Giorgio in Alga
- San Giorgio Maggiore
- San Lazzaro degli Armeni
- Santa Maria della Grazia
- San Pietro di Castello
- San Servolo
- Santo Spirito
- Sottomarina
- Vignole

== See also ==
- List of islands of Italy
- Magistrato alle Acque
- Gronda lagunare
- MOSE
