= Santa Maria della Grazia =

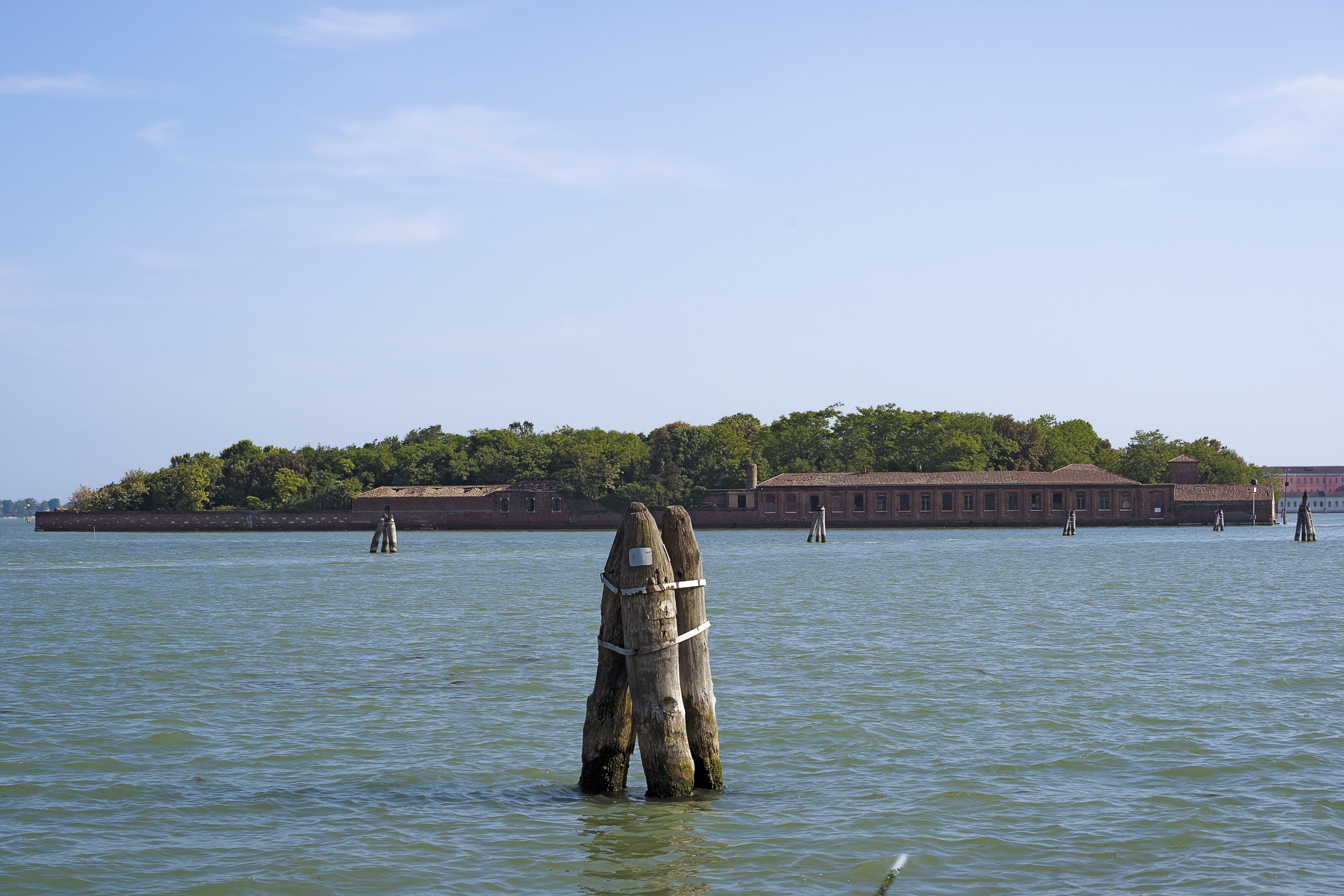
- Santa Maria della Grazia in Venice as seen from La Giudecca

- Location within Venetian Lagoon

Geography
- Coordinates: 45.4192°N 12.3394°E
- Adjacent to: Venetian Lagoon

Administration
- Italy
- Region: Veneto
- Province: Province of Venice

Santa Maria della Grazia or La Grazia is an artificial island of the Venetian lagoon, northern Italy, which lies between the Giudecca and San Clemente.

In 2016 the island was sold to a private company from Treviso, Giesse Investimenti s.r.l., to host a new resort.

== History ==
Santa Maria della Grazia rose during the Middle Ages in the place where Venice’s rubble was discarded. The island takes its name from a supposedly miraculous Madonna which was on display in its former church. In 1264 there was a home for pilgrims to the Holy Land; later it was transformed into a convent. During the Napoleonic period the convent was suppressed and changed to a powder-magazine, which in 1849 exploded destroying both the ex-convent and the church.

The island was the site of an infectious diseases hospital until the end of the twentieth century.

== Gallery ==
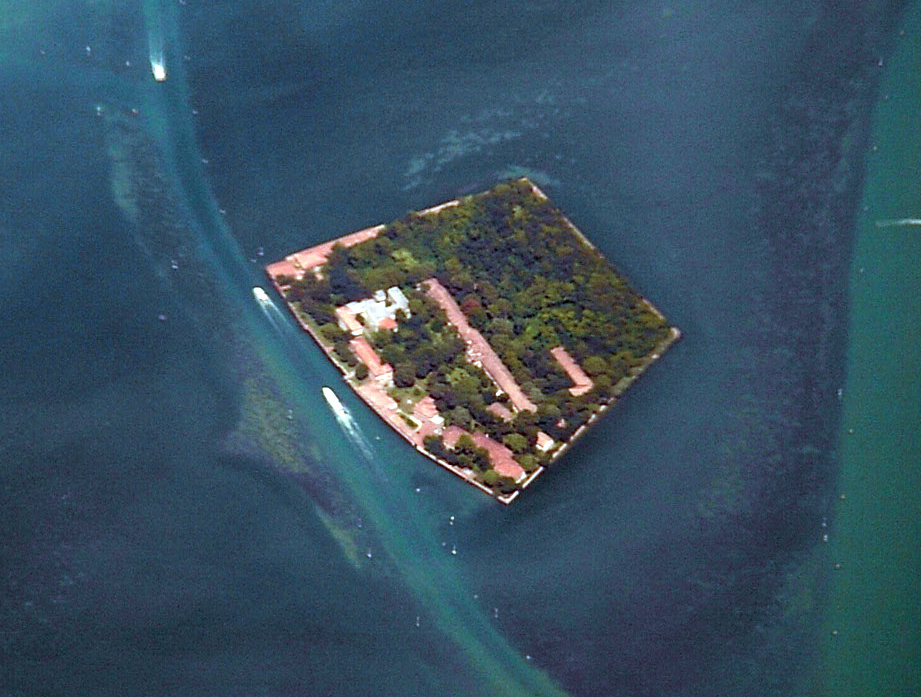
Aerial view

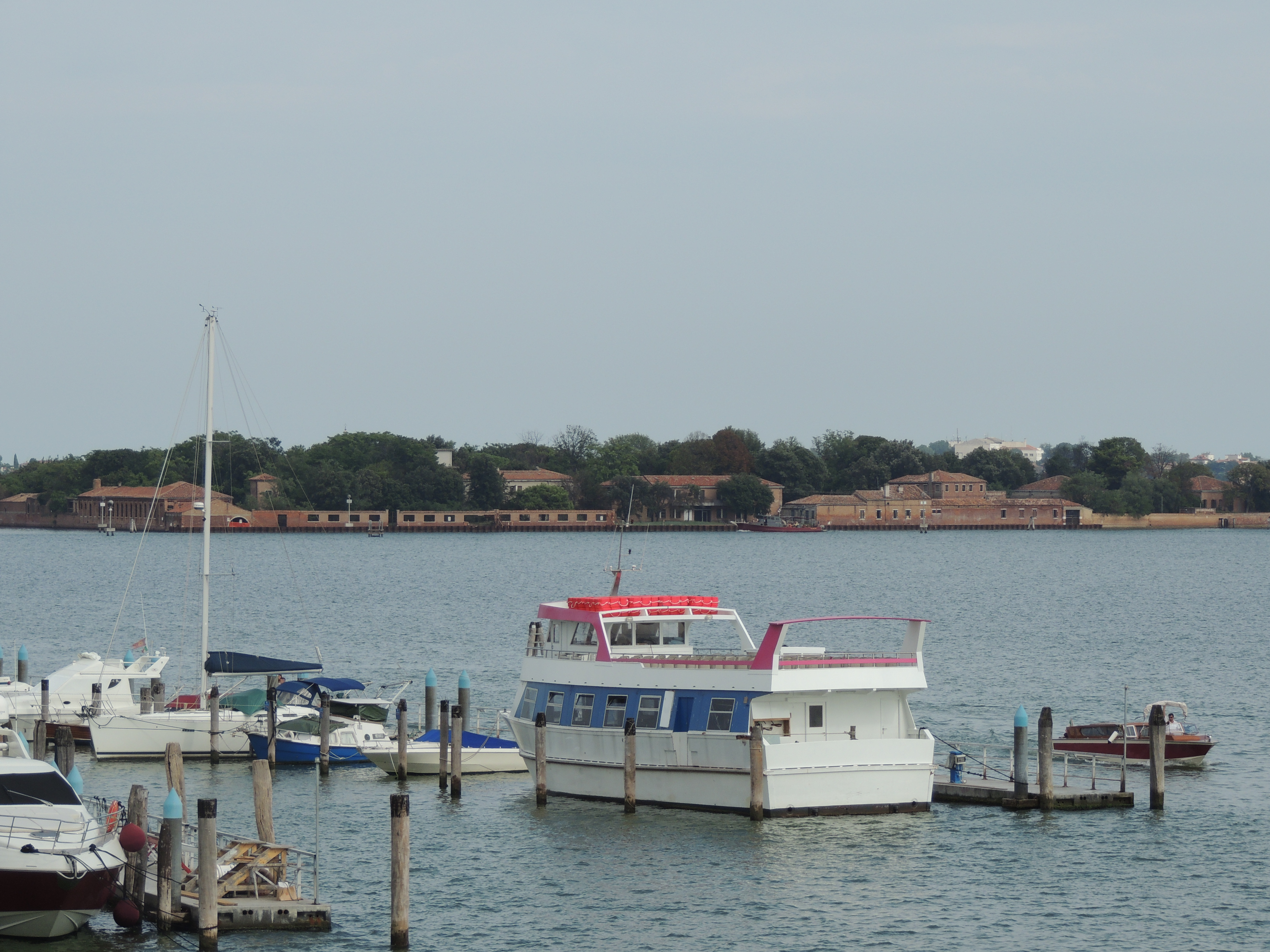

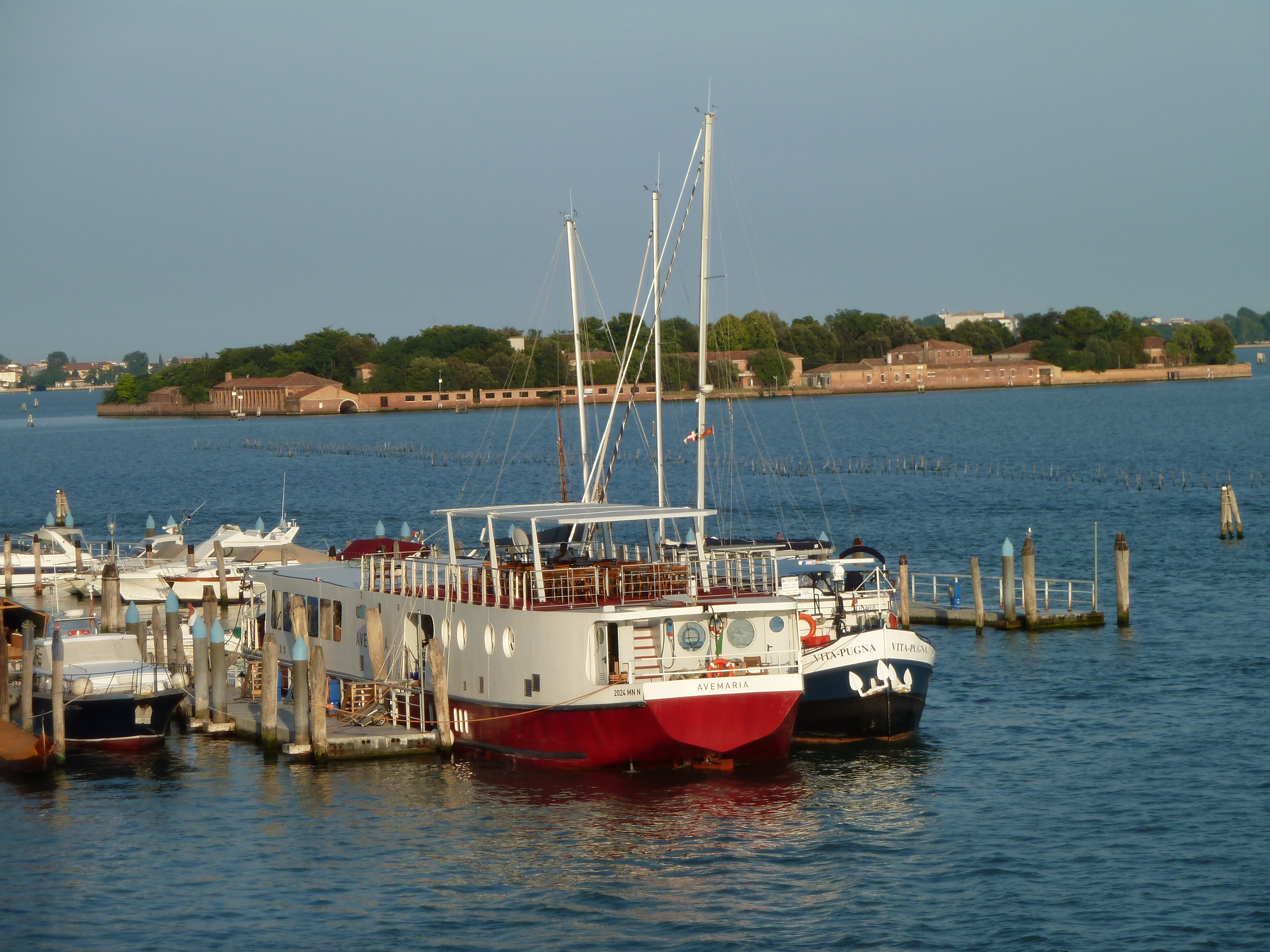
