= La Certosa =

Island in the Venetian Lagoon, Italy

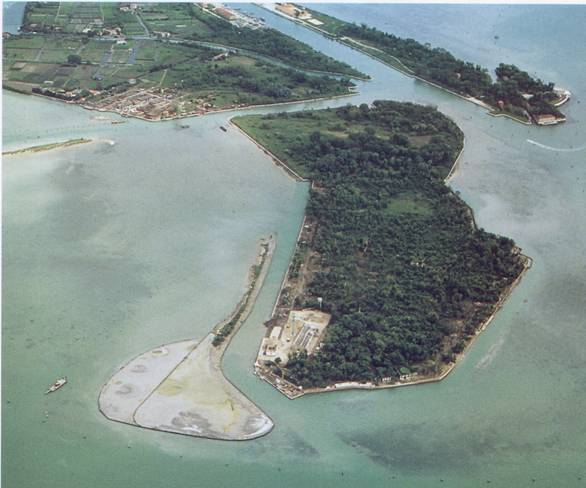
- La Certosa from the south

- Location within Venetian Lagoon

Geography
- Coordinates: 45.433756°N 12.372573°E
- Adjacent to: Venetian Lagoon
- Area: 22 ha (54 acres)

Administration
- Italy
- Region: Veneto
- Province: Province of Venice

La Certosa (Italian: Isola della Certosa) is an island in the Venetian Lagoon, northern Italy. It is located northeast of Venice, being fewer than 250 metres (820 feet) from San Pietro di Castello and little more than 500 metres (1,640 feet) from the Venice Lido. A 20-metre-wide (66 ft) channel separates it from the Vignole island. La Certosa has a surface of some 22 hectares (54 acres).

== History ==
The island housed a community of Augustinian friars starting from 1199. After two centuries, the abandoned island was ceded to the Carthusians, the previous religious edifice being restored from 1490 to 1505. After the Napoleonic conquest of Venice, it became a military installation.

The 17th century Castello delle Polveri ("Powder Castle"), the only historical edifice remained today, has been restored from the late 1990s.

From 21 April to 27 November 2022 the island hosted the first Biennale National Pavilion of the Republic of Namibia with the exhibition titled: A Bridge to the Desert. Covering an area of 20 hectares, the national participation was the most extensive of the 59th Venice Biennale and one of the most extensive of the history of Biennale. The exhibition included two introductory paths to the main works: a 140x2 meters wall covered with Namib desert pictures by Roland Blum (photographer) and an immersive and interactive installation Seek to believe by Studio Amebe.

== Redevelopment ==
In 2010, plans were revealed for a project called "Parco della Certosa", which would redevelop the abandoned island to include a public green park, a nautical center and training school, as well as restaurants, bars, nature trails and water-based sports facilities. The redevelopment is planned to be implemented in stages, with completion originally scheduled for 2015. However, on 12 June 2012, an F2 tornado struck the island, causing major damage to the island's trees. Restoration activities began the same year. The first stage of the park was opened to the public in 2013.

== Transport ==
The island is served by Actv waterbus lines 4.1 (anticlockwise) and 4.2 (clockwise) that connect Murano, Ferrovia, Giudecca and S.Zaccaria. Alilaguna's Blue line also serves the island on its route (Ferrovia-Zattere-San Marco Giardinetti-Lido SME-Certosa-Hospital-Fondamente Nove-Murano-Airport).

== Sources ==
- Busato, Davide; Paola Sfameni (2009). L'isola della Certosa di Venezia, ambiente e storia tra passato e presente. Venice: Centro Studi Riviera del Brenta.
