= Vignola (disambiguation) =

Vignola is a municipality in Emilia–Romagna, Italy.

Vignola may also refer to:

- Vignola (surname), Italian surname

== Places ==
- Vignola-Falesina, a municipality in Trentino, Italy
- Trinità d'Agultu e Vignola, a municipality in Sardinia, Italy

== Other ==
- Cassa di Risparmio di Vignola, an Italian savings bank also known as the Vignola Foundation
- Milano–Vignola, a professional road bicycle race

== See also ==
- Vignol
- Vignole
- Vignoles (disambiguation)
- Vignolles
- Vignols
