= Vignole =

Island of Venetian lagoon

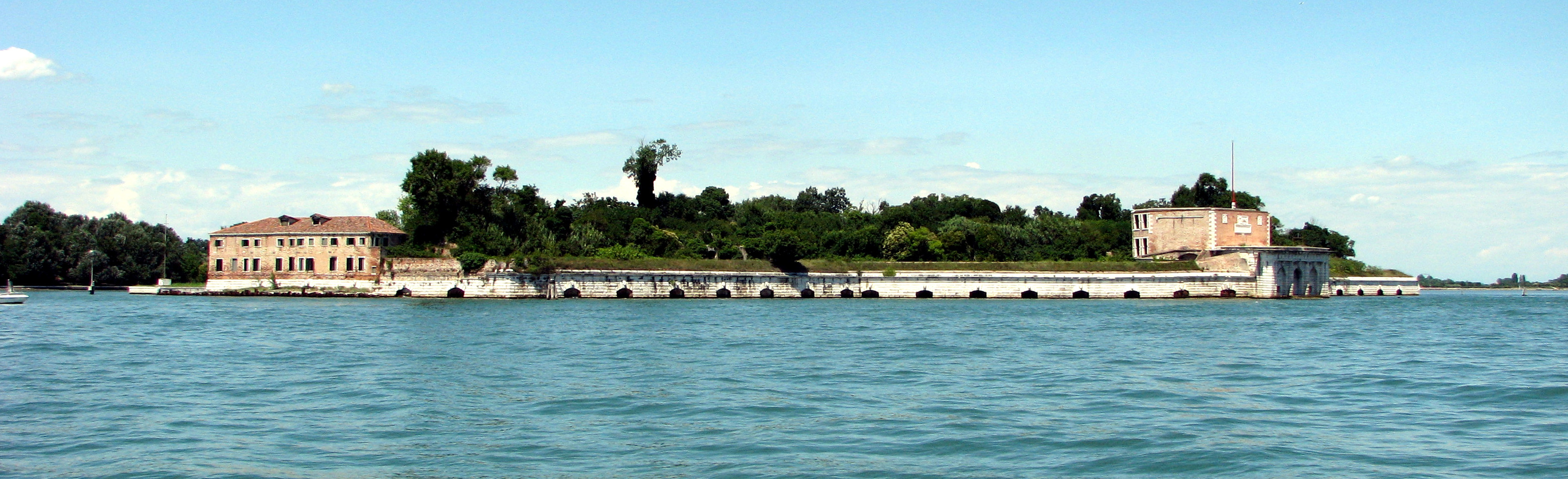
- Fort San Andrea on Vignole

- Location within Venetian Lagoon

Geography
- Coordinates: 45.440531°N 12.376779°E
- Adjacent to: Venetian Lagoon
- Area: 69.2 ha (171 acres)

Administration
- Italy
- Region: Veneto
- Province: Province of Venice

Vignole (also Le Vignole) is an island in the Venetian Lagoon, northern Italy, with an area of 69.20 ha (171 acres). It is located 1 km (0.62 mi) north-east of Venice, between the islands of Sant'Erasmo and La Certosa.

== Location ==
Vignole consists of two islands which are connected by a bridge. As with neighbouring Sant'Erasmo, Vignole has a small population most of whom work in agriculture. The eastern part of the island is a military zone, housing facilities of the amphibious Lagunari Regiment "Serenissima". Two bridges connect the military zone to Sant'Andrea Island, the location of Forte di Sant'Andrea, a mid-16th century fortress.

== History ==
Historically, the island was used by the ancient Romans and the Venetians as a vacation place. It directly faced the Adriatic Sea before accumulation of sand at Punta Sabbioni.

In the 7th century two tribunes from Torcello built a small church dedicated to St. John the Baptist and St. Christine. The few other points of interest include the small church of St. Eurosia, with a small bell tower.

== Transport ==
The island is accessed on Actv waterbus line 13 (Fondamente Nove-Murano-Vignole-Lazzaretto Nuovo-Sant'Erasmo-Treporti). It is also served by a night service.

== Gallery ==
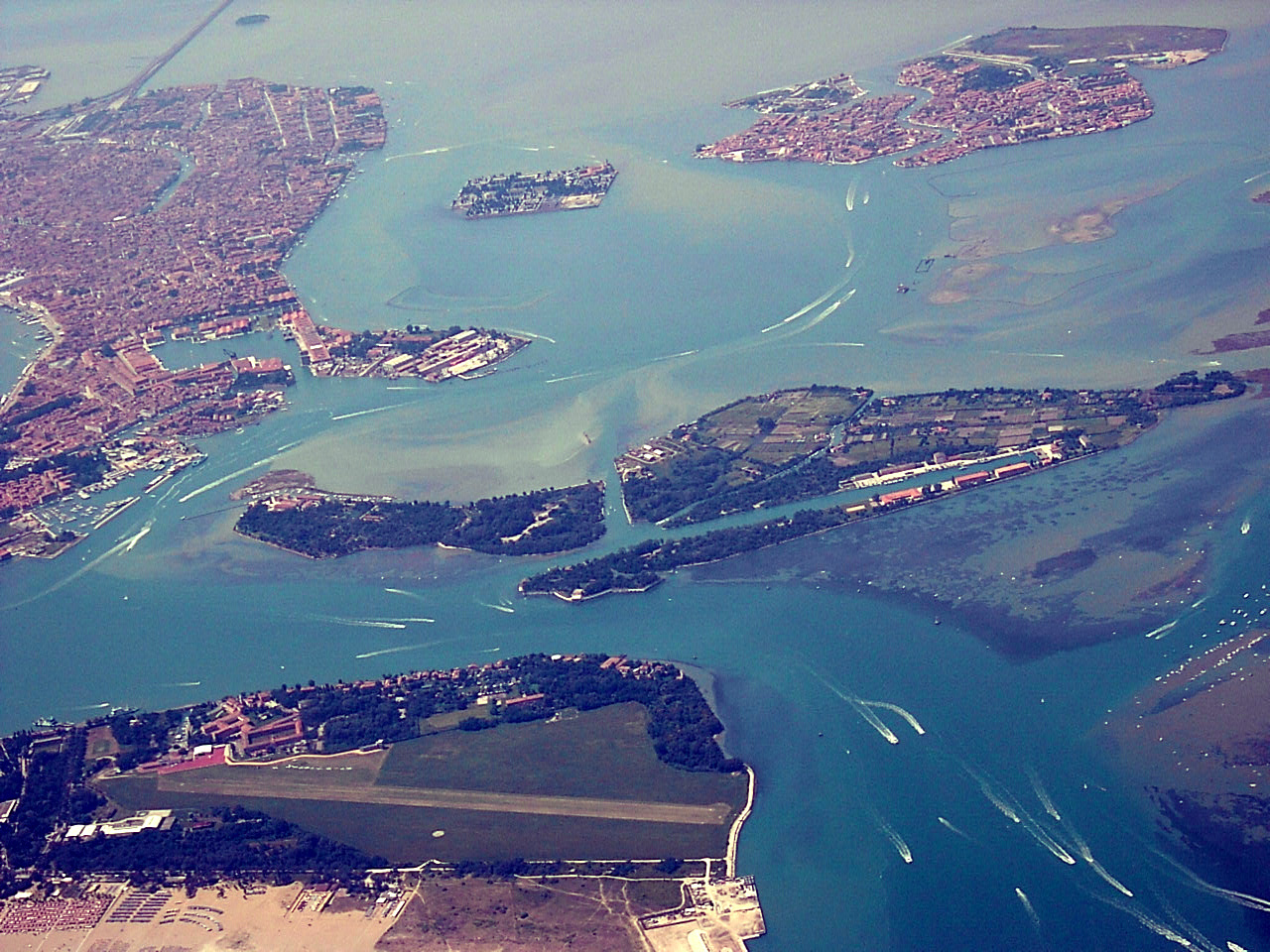
Part of the lagoon from the east. Vignole is in the centre, extending to the right. Venice is in the upper left.

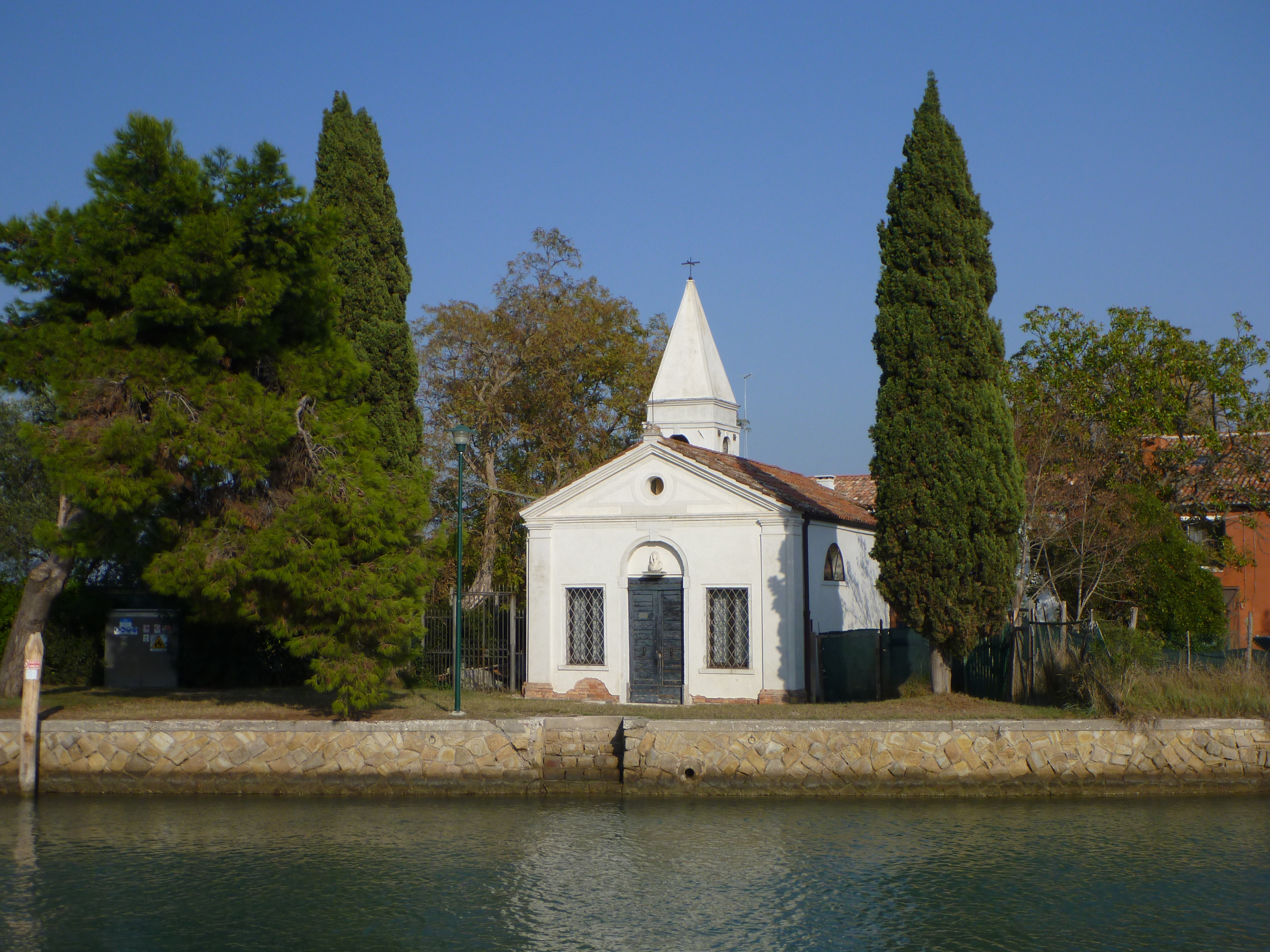
St. Eurosia's church

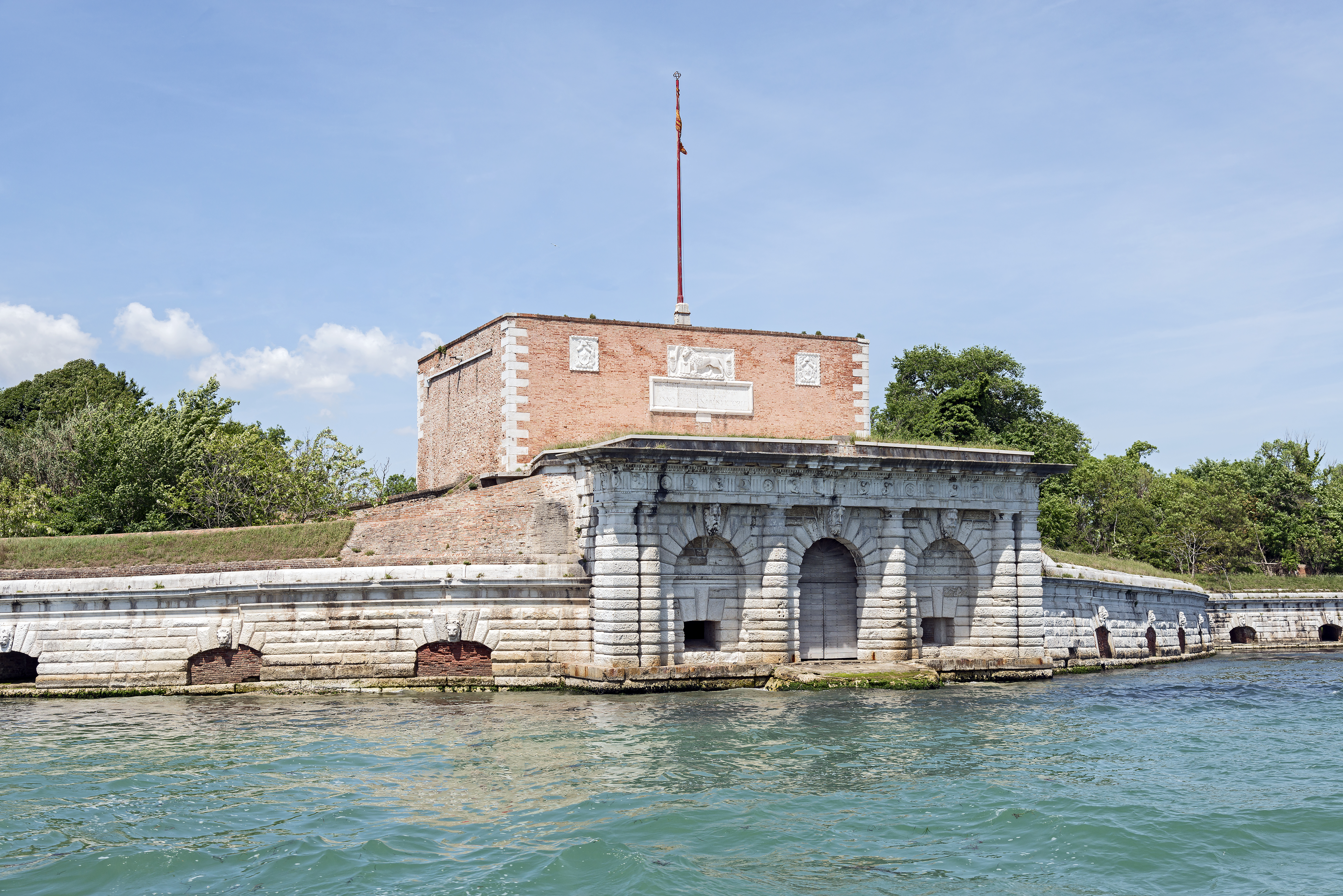
Forte S Andrea
