= Vignoles =

Vignoles can refer to

- Vignoles rail, kind of railway rail
- Vignoles (grape)
- Vignoles, Côte-d'Or, commune of the Côte-d'Or département, France
- Vignoles (surname)

== See also ==
- Vignole, an island in the Venetian Lagoon, northern Italy
