= Motoscafo =

Public waterbus in Venice, Italy

Motoscafi
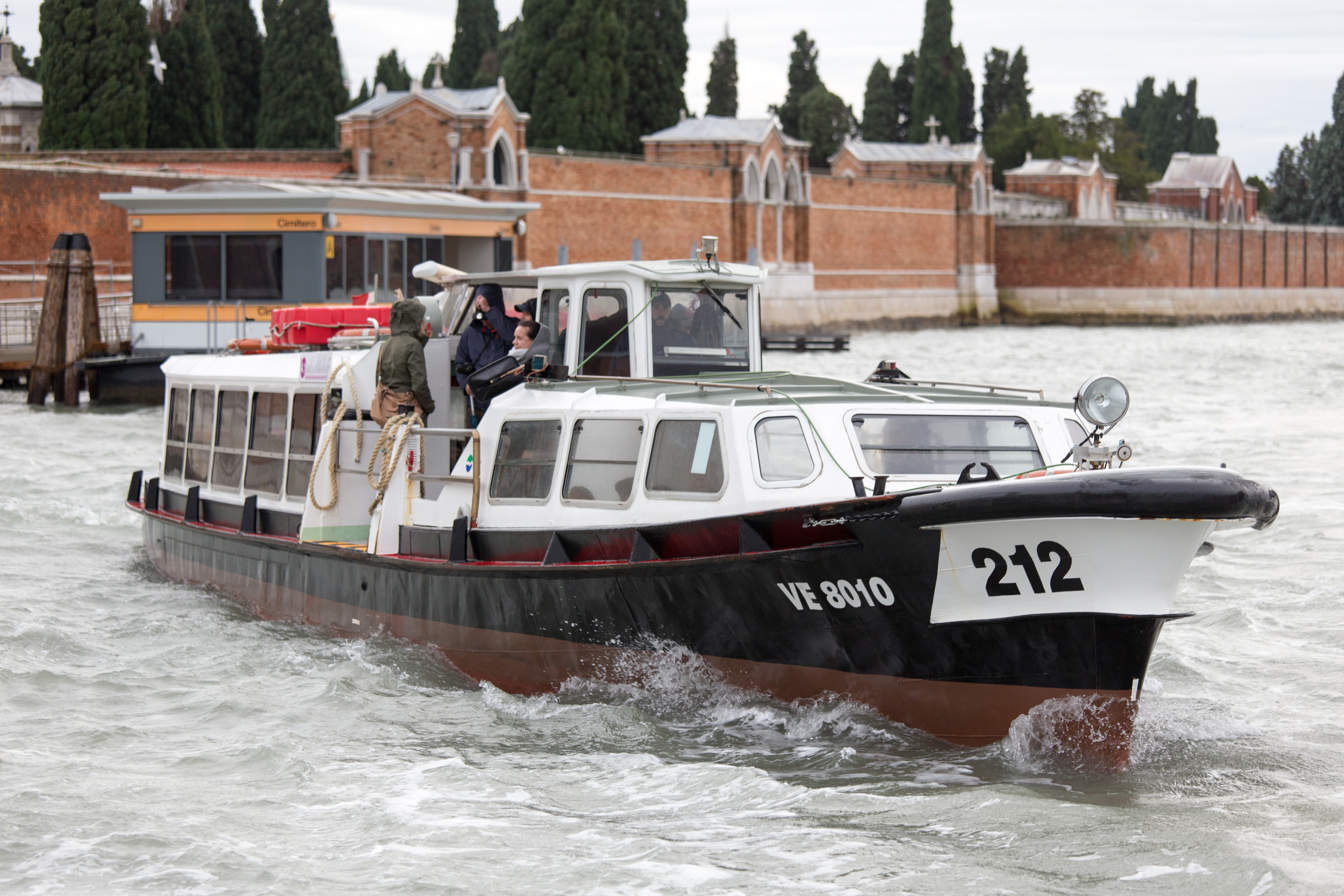
- A series 8 Motoscafo departing San Michele Cemetery, Venice

Class overview
- Operators: Actv
- Subclasses: Ten
- Built: Series 1 to 10

General characteristics
- Type: Series 8
- Displacement: 22 tons
- Length: 21.1 metres (69 ft)
- Beam: 3.75 metres (12.3 ft)
- Draught: 0.95 metres (3.1 ft)
- Installed power: 180 h.p.
- Speed: 11 knots
- Capacity: 154 passengers
- Crew: 2

The motoscafo is a Venetian public waterbus (more slender and faster than a normal vaporetto) which is dedicated to scheduled services along the circumnavigation routes of the historic centre of Venice.

== History ==
The first motoscafi were introduced in 1933 when with the opening of the Rio Nuovo it became necessary to introduce boats smaller than vaporettos, having the capacity to operate along narrower canals and under low bridges. Eight vessels were ordered from C.N.O.M., Venice.

The first vessels had open front and no cabin protection for the crew. Later models provided an enclosed front for passengers and a driving cabin for the crew. Despite these modest improvements the general design and capacity has remained fairly consistent.

The motoscafi are operated by Azienda del Consorzio Trasporti Veneziano (ACTV), the Venetian public transport system. Typically they are deployed on routes 3, 4.1, 4.2, 5.1, 5.2, and 6.

== Fleet ==
Series	Shipyard	No of vessels	Numbers	Date introduced	Notes
1	C.N.O.M., Venice	8	101 to 108	1933	
2		5	109 to 114	1937	Initially containing a Voith-Schneider drive and rear-end, later modified with propeller-rudder system
3	C.N.O.M., Venice		115 to 147	1942	Designed before 1940
4	Papette, Venice	3	148 to 150	1954 to 1955	Modified series 3 desgn
5	ACNIL, Venice	5	151 to 155	1960 to 1962	
6		3	161 - 163	1962	Celli type fast vessels with a top speed of 22 knots constructed in light alloy with an angular hull
7		9	171 to 179	1964	
8	De Poli, Castracani, Toffolo		190 to 225	1978	Similar to series 3
9		1	230	2000	An experimental vessel in aluminium
10	Cantiere Navale de Poli SpA, Venice		266 onwards	2005 to 2006	Similar to series 8
	Papette, Venice		182 to 183	1964	Alfa Romeo Diesel. Used as tug boats.
	Cantieri Tagliapietra Venezia		102 to 105	1988	Volvo Penta D41 LDS Diesel. Single-crew operation, designed for less busy routes.
