= Vignola (surname) =

Vignola is a surname. Notable people with the surname include:

- Beniamino Vignola (born 1959), Italian former footballer
- Frank Vignola (born 1965), American jazz guitarist
- Gaetano Vignola, Italian accelerator physicist
- Giacomo Barozzi da Vignola (1507–1573), Italian architect
- Julie Vignola, Canadian politician
- Joe Vignola (born 1949), American politician
- Karina Vignola (born 1976), Uruguayan television presenter
- Robert G. Vignola (1882–1953), Italian-American actor, screenwriter and film director

== See also ==
- Vignola (disambiguation)
