= San Martino, Burano =

Church building in Venice, Italy

San Martino
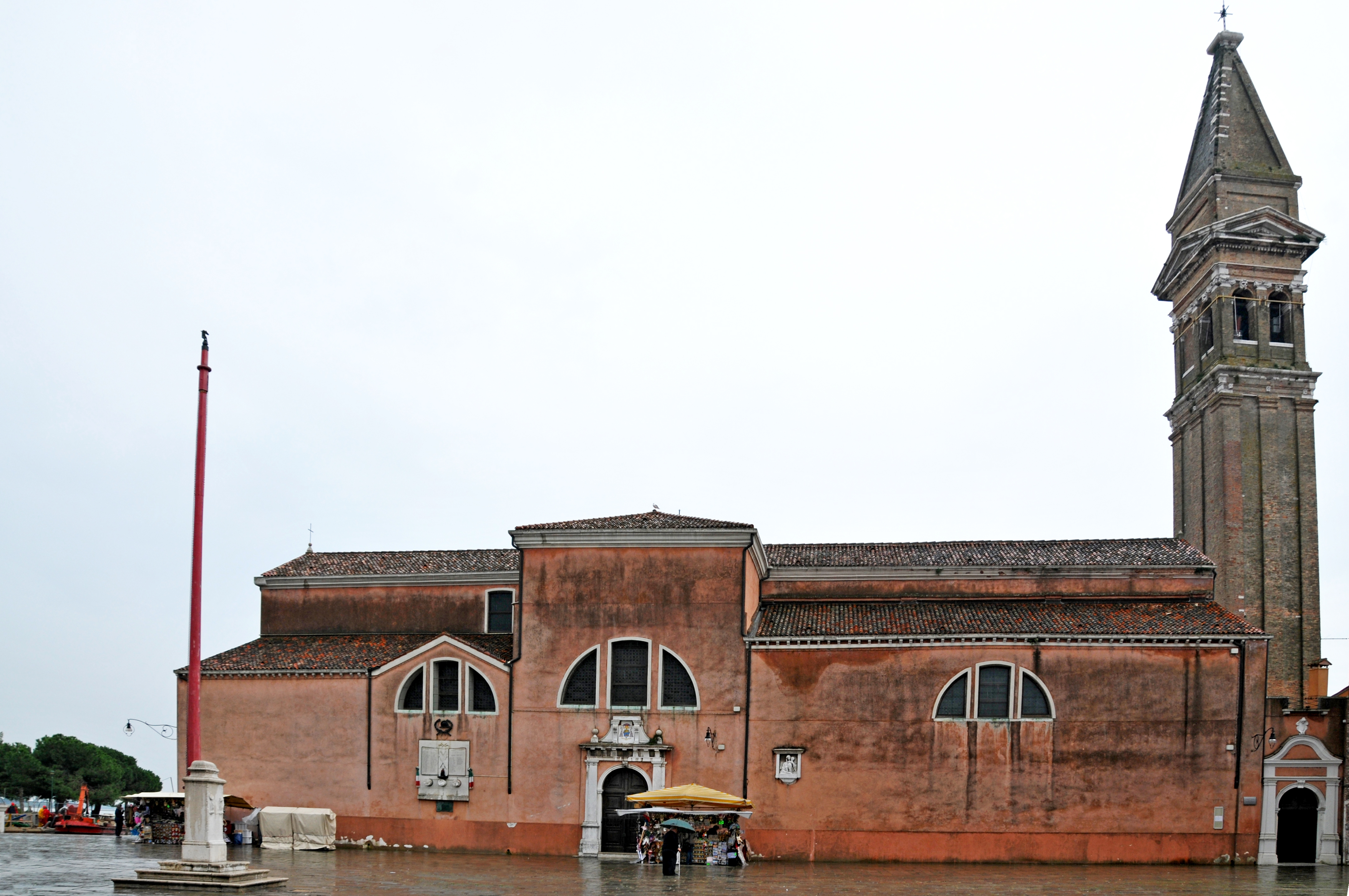

- Location within Italy

Religion
- Affiliation: Roman Catholic
- Province: Venice

Location
- Location: Venice, Italy
- Interactive map of San Martino
- Coordinates: 45°29′03″N 12°25′08″E

Architecture
- Completed: 16th-century

San Martino is a 16th-century, Roman Catholic church in Burano, an island of the city of Venice, region of the Veneto, Italy. The church was reconsecrated in 1645.
