= Actv =

Public transportation company in Italy

Azienda del Consorzio Trasporti Veneziano
- Type: Società per azioni
- Industry: Public Transport
- Founded: 1978
- Headquarters: Venice, Italy
- Services: Bus, tram, waterbus, and infrastructure management
- Owner: 51% municipally owned
- Website: www.actv.it

Actv S.p.A. (Azienda del Consorzio Trasporti Veneziano) is the main public transport company in Venice, responsible for the vaporetti and motoscafi waterbus services. ACTV, a majority publicly owned joint stock corporation, is the main operating subsidiary of AVM Holdings (formerly Azienda Veneziana della Mobilità) which manages most public transport in the region.

ACTV also provides public transport in Chioggia and bus and tram services throughout the province of Venice. However, ACTV is not responsible for waterbus routes between Marco Polo International Airport and the lagoon area (managed by Alilaguna). Connections by bus with Venice airport are jointly managed by ACTV and ATVO (Azienda Trasporti Veneto Orientale).

== History ==
=== Public Transport in Venice Before Actv ===
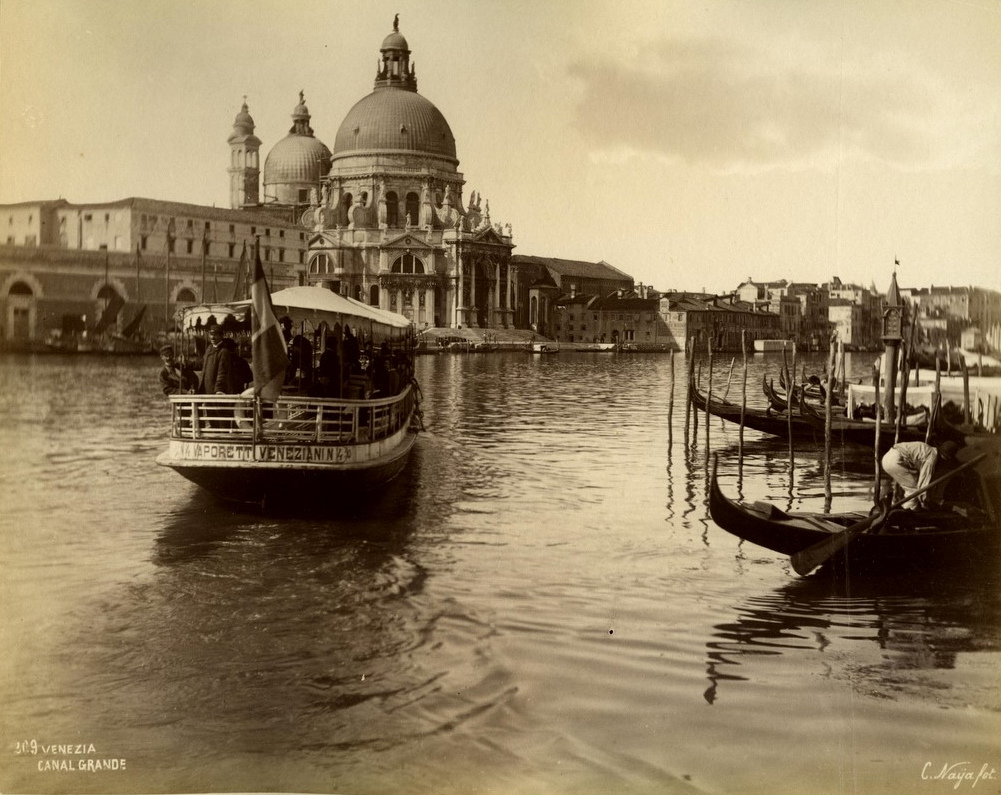
An early photograph from 1881 or 1882

The first experiments with regular public transportation in Venice began in 1881, when, almost simultaneously hand-propelled waterbuses and the first vaporetto, Queen Margherita, began running along the Grand Canal. The Compagnie des Bateaux Omnibus was then set up with French funds, operating eight steamers. In 1880 the CBO was replaced by the Società Veneta Lagunare (Venetian Lagoon Company, SVL), who extended the line by offering routes towards the mainland and outlying islands.

Following a referendum in 1903, the Municipality of Venice took direct ownership of the SVL's inland (Venice-based) vaporetto services and their fleet of 23 boats, founding the Azienda Comunale per la Navigazione Interna (Municipal Company for Inland Navigation, ACNI). In 1930 the ACNI acquired the SVL's services to the outlying islands and renamed itself the Azienda Comunale di Navigazione Interna Lagunare (Municipal Company of Lagoon Waterborne Transport, ACNIL).

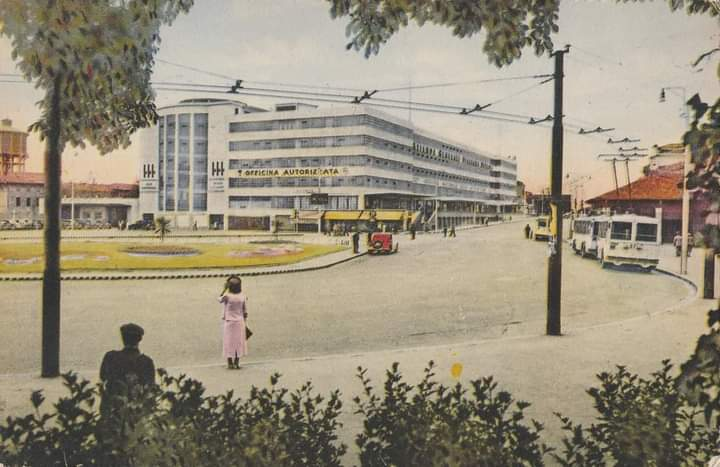
The Piazzale Roma in 1936

When the Ponte della Libertà opened in 1933, alongside a newly constructed car terminal in Piazzale Roma, the ACNIL began operating bus routes between Venice and Mestre (the mainland) under the name 'Tramvie di Mestre.' In 1941, ACNIL was also given clearance to directly manage the land transportation on the Lido Island after the cessation of the tram service by the Compagnia Italiana Grandi Alberghi (CIGA).

During World War II, a large part of the fleet of boats was used by the Italian Army and the Navy for military practice purposes and by the end of the War, many of the vessels had been sunk or seriously damaged. Therefore, throughout the 1950s ANCIL undertook a programme aimed at repairing and replacing damaged boats and updating the ancillary parts of the service (landing points, piers and pontoons).

In 1965, ACNIL acquired the transport service of Mestre and the mainland, taking over from Società Filovie Mestre (SFM). The following year, ANCIL phased out trolleybuses in Mestre in favour of motorbuses.

=== ACTV (nationalisation and privatisation) ===
Azienda del Consorzio Trasporti Veneziano (Venetian Transport Consortium Company, ACTV) was founded on October 1, 1978. This followed a program of nationalisation which brought Venice's major public transport companies (ANCIL, SVET, and SVA) into public ownership.

Following the Italy-wide decentralisation of public transport in 2001 with Legislative Decree 422/97, ACTV was semi-privatised with 467,632 shares being issued at €100 (193,627 liras). (Note: This was during Italy's transition to the Euro, so shares were issued in liras to a value equivalent to €100 Euro.) ACTV became a joint-stock company (società per azioni / S.p.A.) with at least 51% of shares to be publicly owned.

Between 2002 and 2004 ACTV was involved in a case referred to the European Court of Justice, regarding the awarding of public transport service contracts in Mestre. The court's ruling laid down guidance on fair methods for attaching weightings to evaluation criteria and sub-criteria after the publication of contract documents.

In 2006, the ACTV corporate offices were transferred to Tronchetto. While in 2010 ACTV acquired the Cantiere Navale De Poli Spa dockyards and opened the first section of tramway in Mestre. 2012 saw further restructuring of ACTV to closer integrate the formerly independent companies AVM, ACTV, VELA, and PMV under the parent company AVM Holdings and benefit from synergies in reducing overheads. In 2013 the Venezia Unica City Pass was introduced, combining public transport and tourist attraction entrance in one ticket.

During the COVID-19 pandemic in Italy, the ACTV was forced to cut services considerably, particularly the vaporetti.

== Operations ==
On AVM's behalf, ACTV manages the majority of public and road transport services in Venice and Mestre, including parking garages and parking bays for both cars and bicycles, park and ride services, Low Emission Zones (ZTL), the removal of wrongly parked vessels, staging facilities for boats at Sacca della Misericordia and Isola Nova del Tronchetto, the Venice People Mover, and (most famously) public waterbuses.

=== Buses and waterbuses ===
==== Lagoon area ====
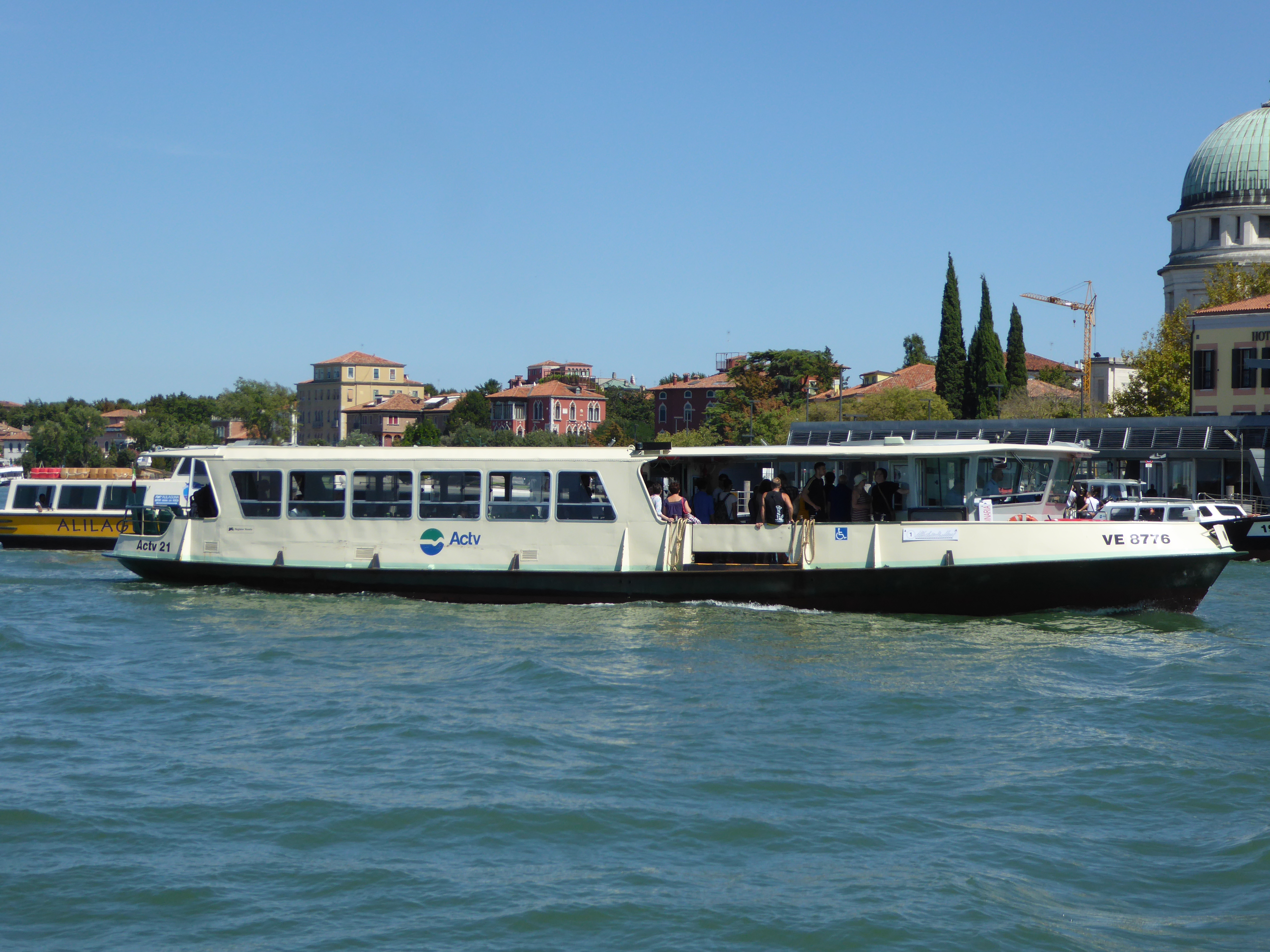
A series 90 vaporetto

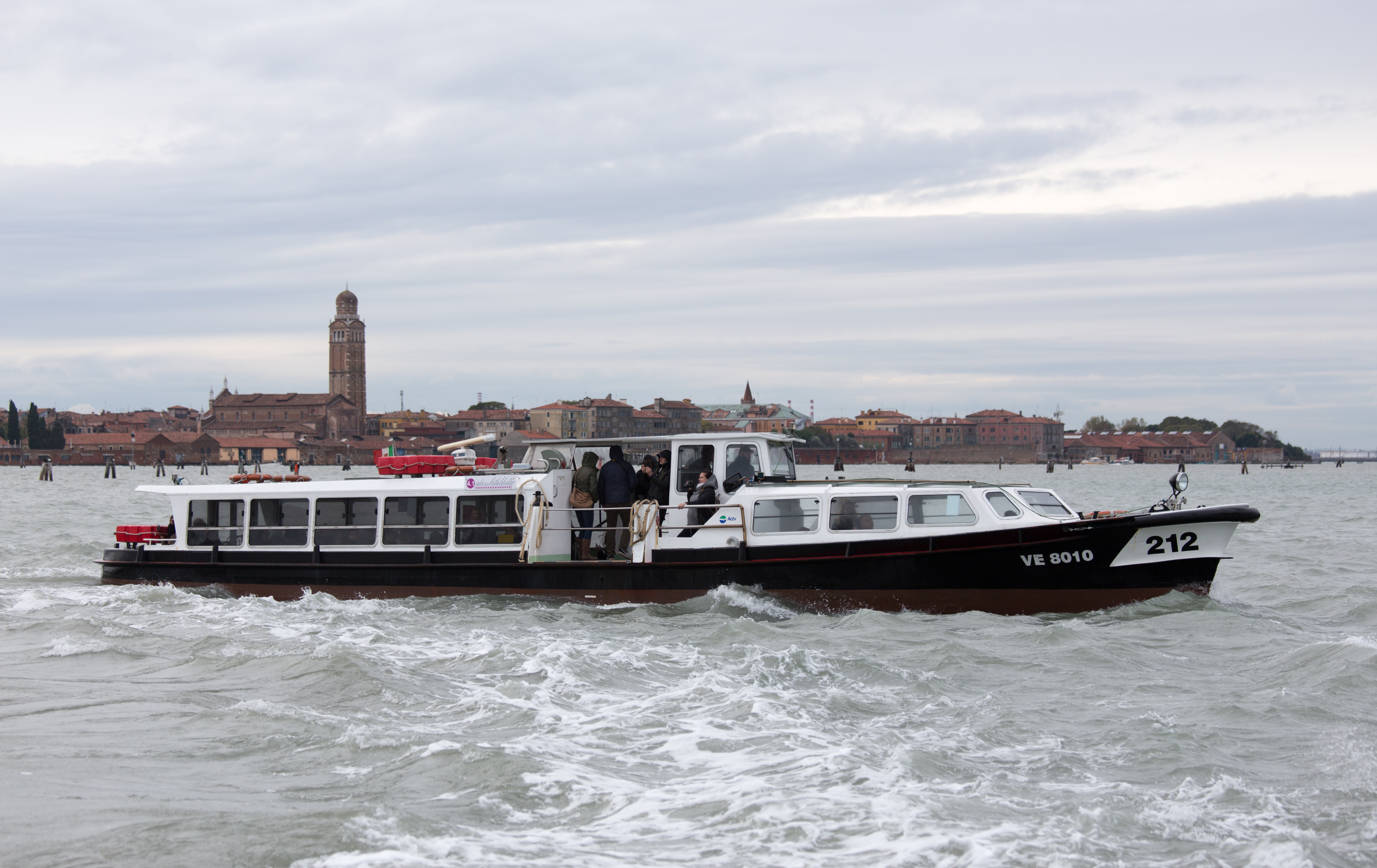
A series 8 motoscafo

Within the Lagoon area ACTV provides motorised waterbus services (high-capacity vaporetti and faster motoscafi), which ply regular routes along the Grand Canal and between the city's islands.

==== Lido and Pellestrina islands ====
Road traffic is permitted on Lido and Pellestrina islands, which form a barrier between the southern Venetian Lagoon and the Adriatic Sea. ACTV manage bus services on these islands and connections by waterbus with the other islands (Venice, Murano, Burano) and the Cavallino-Treporti peninsula.

==== Mainland ====
ACTV operates in all 4 boroughs of the Venice Mainland: Mestre-Carpenedo, Marghera, Chirignago-Zelarino and Favaro Veneto. ACTV runs the two tramway lines in Mestre and bus services connecting the boroughs. Several bus routes link the mainland with Piazzale Roma, the main bus station in Venice, via Ponte della Libertà, a road bridge connecting the historical center of the city of Venice to the mainland.

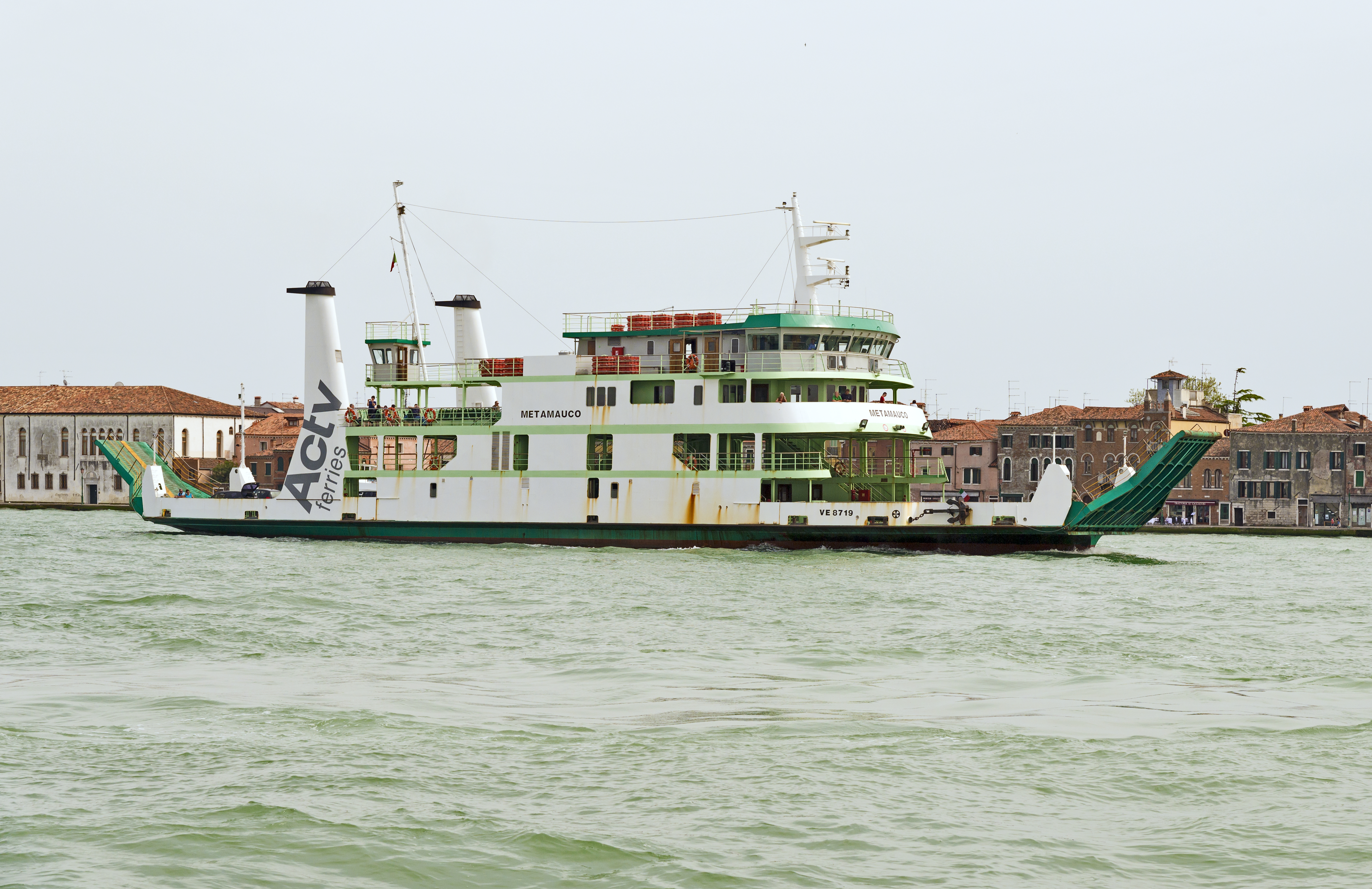
Ferry from Tronchetto to Lido in “Canale della Giudecca”

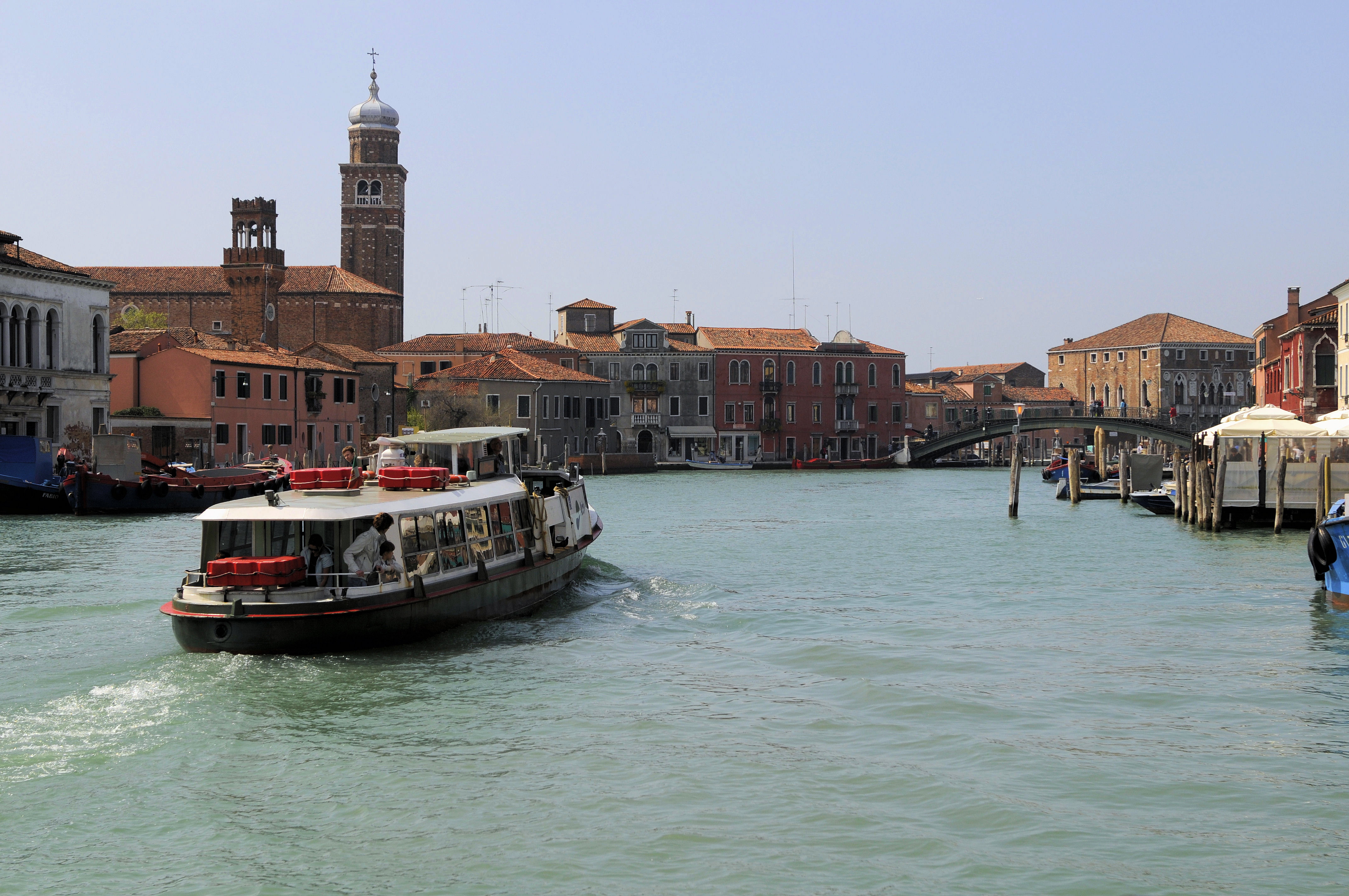
Vaporetto in Venice

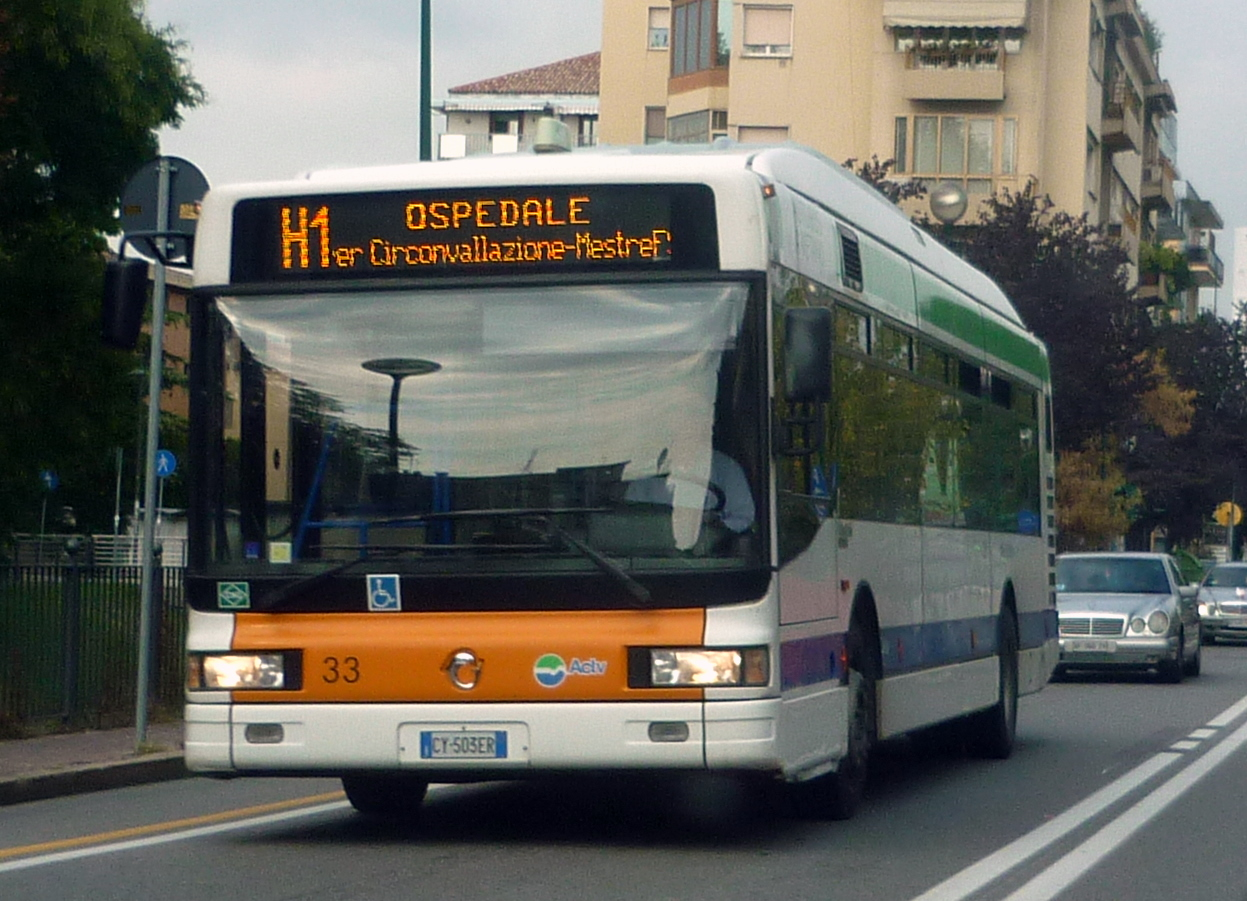
Bus in Mestre

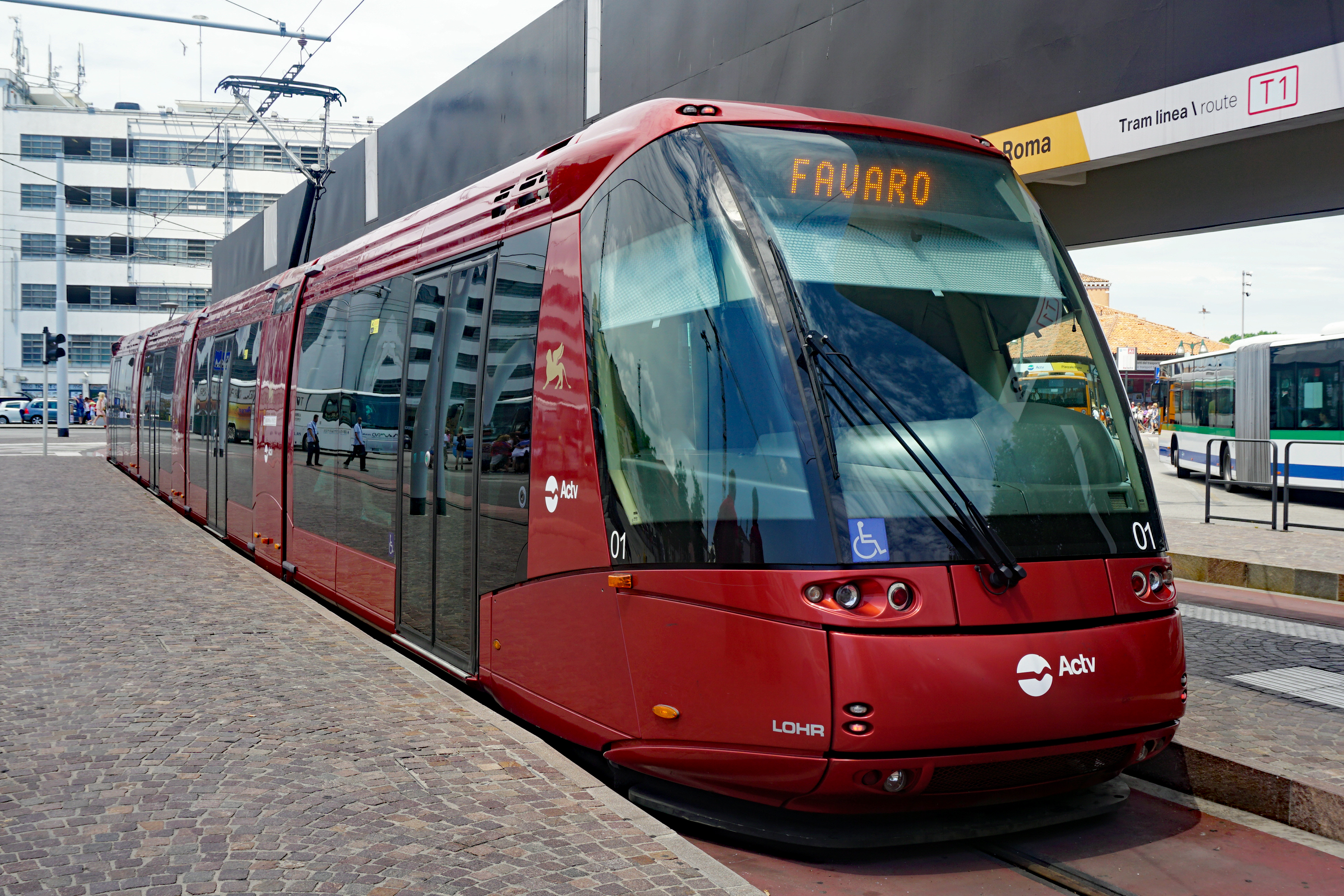
Tram in Venice leaving Piazzale Roma

Map of the ACTV waterbus lines in Venice

Map of the ACTV waterbus lines in Venice

== Tram Routes ==
- T1 Venice Piazzale Roma-Mestre Centro-Monte Celo (Favaro Veneto)
- T2 Salamonio (Marghera)-Mestre Centro

== Waterbus Routes ==
- 1 Piazzale Roma-Ferrovia-San Marco-Rialto-San Marco-Lido di Venezia Santa Maria Elisabetta
- 2 San Marco - San Zaccaria-Giudecca-Tronchetto-Piazzale Roma-Ferrovia-Rialto
- 2/ Piazzale Roma-Ferrovia-Rialto
- 3 Piazzale Roma-Ferrovia-Murano-Ferrovia-Piazzale Roma
- 4.1 Murano-Fondamente Nove-Ferrovia-Piazzale Roma-Giudecca-San Zaccaria-Fondamente Nove-Murano
- 4.2 Murano-Fondamente Nove-San Zaccaria-Giudecca-Piazzale Roma-Ferrovia-Fondamente Nove-Murano
- 5.1 Lido di Venezia Santa Maria Elisabetta-Hospital-Fondamente Nove-Ferrovia-Piazzale Roma-San Marco - San Zaccaria-Lido di Venezia Santa Maria Elisabetta
- 5.2 Lido di Venezia-San Marco - San Zaccaria-Piazzale Roma-Ferrovia-Fondamente Nove-Hospital-Lido di Venezia Santa Maria Elisabetta
- 6 Piazzale Roma-Santa Marta-San Basilio-Zattere-Spirito Santo-Giardini Biennale-Sant'Elena-Lido di Venezia Santa Maria Elisabetta
- 10 Lido di Venezia Santa Maria Elisabetta-San Marco Giardinetti-Zattere-Lido di Venezia Santa Maria Elisabetta
- 11 Lido di Venezia Santa Maria Elisabetta-Alberoni Faro Rocchetta-Santa Maria del Mare-Pellestrina-Chioggia
- 12 Venezia Fondamente Nove-Murano-Mazzorbo-(Torcello)-Burano-Treporti-Punta Sabbioni
- 13 Venezia Fondamente Nove-Murano-Vignole-Sant'Erasmo-Treporti
- 14 Venezia San Zaccaria-Lido di Venezia Santa Maria Elisabetta-Punta Sabbioni-(Burano)
- 15 Venezia San Zaccaria-Punta Sabbioni
- 16 Venezia Zattere-Fusina
- 17 Tronchetto-Lido San Niccolò
- 20 San Marco - San Zaccaria-San Servolo-San Lazzaro-San Servolo-San Marco - San Zaccaria
- 22 Punta Sabbioni-Hospital-Fondamente Nove-Tre Archi
- N San Marco - San Zaccaria-Canale della Giudecca-Canal Grande-Lido di Venezia Santa Maria Elisabetta
- NLN Venezia Fondamente Nove-Sant'Erasmo-Burano-Punta Sabbioni
- NMU Fondamente Nove-Murano-Fondamente Nove

== Mestre Urban Bus Routes ==
- 2 Venice-Della Libertà-Mestre FS-Circonvallazione-Torre Belfredo-Pasqualigo-Viale Don Sturzo
- 3 SFMR Mestre Hospital-Torre Belfredo-Circonvallazione-Piazza Sant'Antonio-Catene-Villabona
- 4 Venice-Mestre Centro-Favaro-Via Altinia
- 4L Venice-Mestre Centro
- 5 Venice-San Giuliano-Villaggio Laguna-Tessera-Aeroporto Marco Polo
- 6 Venice-Piazza Sant'Antonio-Catene-Chirignago-Spinea
- 6L Venice-Piazza Sant'Antonio-Via Correnti
- 7 Venice-Della Libertà-Chirignago-Spinea-Viale San Remo-Via Martiri della Libertà
- 7L Venice-Mestre-Brendole
- 10 Asseggiano-Quarnaro-Mattuglie-Mestre FS-Mattuglie-Asseggiano
- 12L Venice-San Giuliano-Piazza 27 Ottobre
- 13 Via Cavergnago-Marghera-Via Arduino
- 15 Aeroporto Marco Polo-Tessera-Forte Marghera-Piazza 27 Ottobre-Mestre FS-Via Torino (Università)
- 16 Rizzardi-Piazza Sant'Antonio-Malcontenta-Moranzani
- 18 Mestre FS-Malcontenta-Ca' Sabbioni
- 19 Venice-Campalto-Favaro-Via Altinia
- 20 Martellago-Zelarino-Mestre Centro
- 21 Martellago-Maerne FS-Maerne-Zelarino-Mestre Centro
- 24 Venice-San Giuliano-Pertini-Bissuola-Casona-Pertini-San Giuliano-Venice
- 24H Venice-Pertini-Casona-SFMR Mestre Hospital-Don Tosatto
- 31H Mestre Hospital-Don Tosatto-Don Peron-Circonvallazione-Mestre FS-Via Torino (Università)-Forte Marghera-Pertini-Bissuola-Mestre Centro-Torre Belfredo-Mestre Hospital
- 32H Mestre Hospital-Torre Belfredo-Mestre Centro-Bissuola-Pertini-Forte Marghera-Via Torino (Università)-Mestre FS-Circonvallazione-Don Peron-Don Tosatto-Mestre Hospital
- 33H Mestre Hospital-Castellana-Mestre FS-Bissuola-Via Cavergnago
- 34H Mestre Hospital-Terraglio-Mestre FS-Bissuola-Via Cavegnago
- 43 Venice-Della Libertà-San Giuliano-Forte Marghera-Via Torino (Università)-Ca' Marcello-Mestre FS
- 44 Favaro DS-Altinia-Ca'Solaro-Chiesa-Ca'Solaro-Pasqualigo-Viale Don Sturzo-Vallon-Borgoforte
- 45 Favaro-Tessera-Aeroporto Marco Polo-Ca' Noghera
- 45H Mestre Hospital-Favaro-Tessera-Ca' Noghera
- 47H Asseggiano-SFMR Spinea-Chirignago-Mattuglie-Zelarino-Mestre Hospital
- 48H Martellago-Maerne-Terraglio-Mestre Hospital-Mestre Centro
- 53 Piazza 27 Ottobre-Mestre FS-Malcontenta
- 66 Venice-Catene-Chirignago
- 80 Venice-Mestre-Trivignano-Maerne-Martellago
- 81F Rizzardi-Piazza Sant'Antonio-Cimitero-Rizzardi
- 84 Venice-Favaro-Dese FS
- 86 Mestre FS-Vempa-Banchina dell'Azoto
- N1 Venice-Piazza 27 Ottobre-Mestre FS-Venice
- N2 Venice-Piazza Sant'Antonio-Venice
- CSMN Istituto Foscari-Gritti-Barbarigo-Stefanini-Zuccante-Bruno-Pacinotti
- CSMS Istituto Gramsci-Morin-Volta-San Marco

== Chioggia Urban Bus Routes ==
- 1 Isola Unione-Campo Marconi-Borgo San Giovanni-Madonna Marina-Momolo-Isola Unione
- 2 Isola Unione-Madonna Marina-Borgo San Giovanni-Campo Marconi-Isola Unione
- 3 Ca' Bianca-Parco Clodì-Brondolo-Mediterraneo-Lungomare-Isola Unione
- 4 Cavanella-Brondolo-Mediterraneo-Lungomare-Isola Unione
- 5 Isola Verde-Brondolo-Mediterraneo-Lungomare-Isola Unione
- 6 Isola Unione-Momolo-Lungomare-Mediterraneo-Borgo San Giovanni-Campo Marconi
- 7 Campo Marconi-Borgo San Giovanni-Mediterraneo-Lungomare-Momolo-Isola Unione
- 21 Isola Unione-Madonna Marina-Ridotto Madonna-Brondolo-Centro Clodì-Brondolo-Ridotto Madonna-Madonna Marina-Isola Unione

== Lido Urban Bus Routes ==
- A Klinger-Piazzale Santa Maria Elisabetta-Via Sandro Gallo-Ca' Bianca-Malamocco-Alberoni-Faro Rocchetta
- B Piazzale Santa Maria Elisabetta-Via Sandro Gallo-Ca' Bianca-Malamocco
- C Piazzale Santa Maria Elisabetta-Via Sandro Gallo-Piazzale Torta-Via Sandro Gallo-Piazzale Santa Maria Elisabetta
- CA Piazzale Santa Maria Elisabetta-Via Sandro Gallo-Lungomare Marconi-Gran Viale Santa Maria Elisabetta-Piazzale Santa Maria Elisabetta
- CO Piazzale Santa Maria Elisabetta-Gran Viale Santa Maria Elisabetta-Lungomare Marconi-Via Sandro Gallo-Piazzale Santa Maria Elisabetta
- N Piazzale Santa Maria Elisabetta-Via Sandro Gallo-Ca' Bianca-Malamocco-Alberoni-Faro Rocchetta-Santa Maria del Mare-Pellestrina
- V Piazzale Santa Maria Elisabetta-Gran Viale Santa Maria Elisabetta-Lungomare Marconi-Colombo-Via Parri

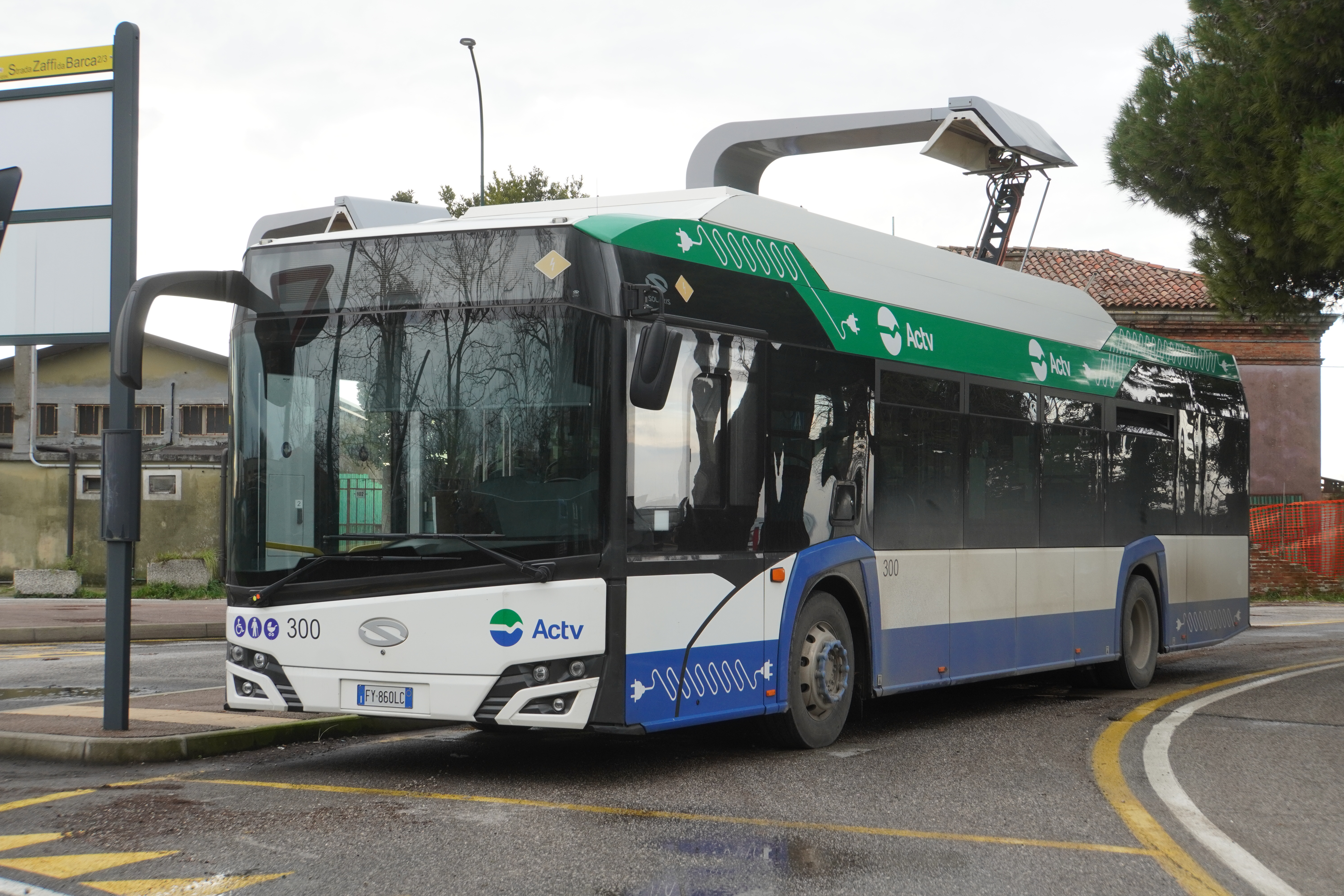
Actv Bus 300 (FY860LC), a Solaris Urbino 12 electric. This type of bus is used on various routes on Lido.

== Suburban Bus Routes ==
- 2E Rio San Martino-Scorzè
- 3E Borgoricco-Sant'Angelo-Veternigo-Zianigo-Mirano
- 4E Noale-Salzano-Mirano
- 4DE Noale-Salzano-Mirano-Catene-Venice
- 5E Noale-Robegano-Maerne-Olmo-Zelarino-Mestre Centro
- 6E Scorzè-Martellago-Trivignano-Zelarino-Mestre Centro
- 7E Mirano-Orgnano-Spinea-Chirignago-Mestre-Venice
- 7DE Mirano-Spinea-Catene-Venice
- 8E Treviso-Preganziol-Mogliano Veneto-Marocco-Mestre Centro
- 8AE Via Mattei-Marcon-Mogliano Veneto-Mestre Centro
- 9E Quarto d'Altino FS -Quarto d'Altino-Le Crete-San Liberale-Della Vittoria-Marcon (Villaggio Cooperazione)-Viale S. Marco-Alta- Dello Sport-Gaggio-Marcon (Via Mattei)-Dese-Altinia-Gobbi-Passo Campalto-Sabbadino-Orlanda-Forte Marghera-Piazza 27 Ottobre
- 10E Mirano-Campocroce-Scaltenigo-Ballò-Vetrego-Marano-Mirano
- 11E Mirano-Maerne-Martellago-Scorzè
- 12E Scorzè-Cappella-Peseggia-Gardigiano-Mogliano Veneto/Venice
- 14E Casale sul Sile-Quarto d'Altino-Gaggio-Marcon-Mogliano Veneto
- 15E Badoere/Zero Branco-Mogliano Veneto
- 16E Trebaseleghe-Scorzè
- 17E Caltana-Caselle-Santa Maria in Sala-Mirano
- HE Noale-Robegano-Salzano-Mirano (Hospital)-Maerne FS-Martellago-Via Castellana-Martellago
- 53E Padua-Stra-Fiesso-Dolo-Mira-Oriago-Marghera-Venice
- 54E Corte-Bojon-Premaore-Camponogara-Dolo
- 54RE Bojon-Premaore-Camponogara-Calcroci-Sambruson-Porto Menai-Piazza Vecchia-Via Romea-Marghera-Mestre/Venice
- 55E Celeseo/Stra-Vigonovo-Galta-Fosso'-Camponogara-Dolo
- 55SE Dolo-Paluello-San Pietro di Stra-Stra
- 56E Dolo-Sambruson-Piazza Vecchia-Gambrare-Mira-Mirano-Marano
- 57E Mellaredo-Pianiga-Marano-Oriago-Mestre/Venice
- 58E Adria-Cavarzere-Piove di Sacco-Campolongo Maggiore-Fosso'-Dolo
- 58RE Adria-Cavarzere-Piove di Sacco-Campolongo Maggiore-Fosso'-Dolo
- 59E Dolo-Cazzago-Scaltenigo-Marano-Mirano
- 60E Cavarzere/Boscochiaro-Rottanova-Piove di Sacco-Stra
- 66E Mellaredo-Pianiga-Arino-Cazzago-Dolo
- 67E Piove di Sacco-Corte-Bojon-Campagna Lupia-Calcroci-Dolo
- 67RE Piove di Sacco-Corte-Bojon-Calcroci-Venice
- 72E Pettorazza Grimani-Cavarzere
- 73E Rottanova-Cavarzere
- 81E Sottomarina-Chioggia-San Pietro-Boscochiaro-Cavarzere
- 82E Sottomarina-Chioggia-Camponogara-Fosso'-San Pietro di Stra-Stra-Fiesso d'Artico-Dolo
- 83E Cavarzere-Passetto-Grignella
- Route for Mirano's Schools
- Route for Mogliano Veneto's Schools
- Route for Piove di Sacco's Schools
- Route for Dolo's Schools
- Route for Adria's Schools
- Route for ENAIP Noale

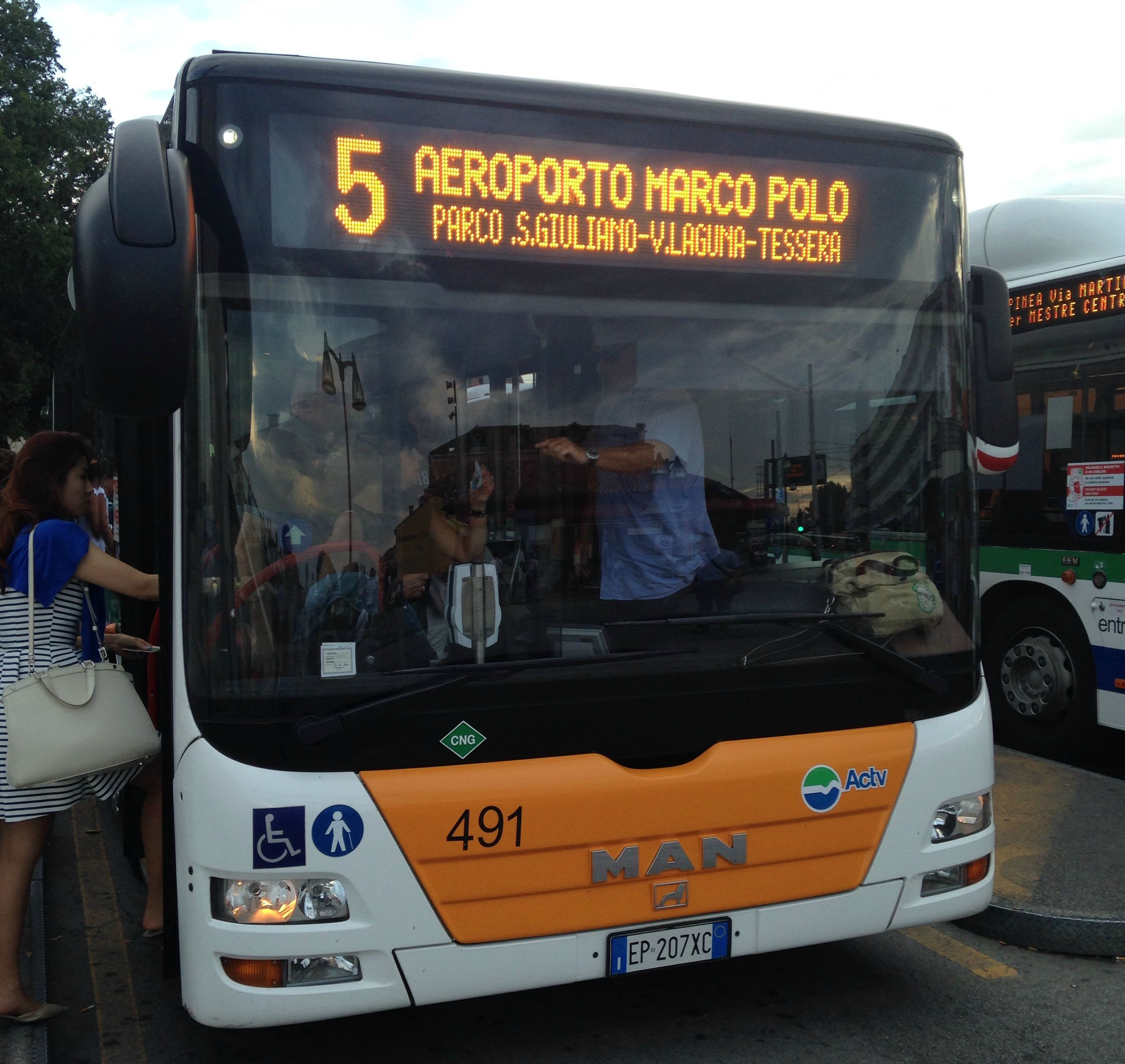
Bus MAN Lion's City CNG on route 5 towards Marco Polo Airport.

== Omnibus Shuttle ==
- "Omnibus Dolo" Dolo-Cazzago-Dolo FS
- "Omnibus Mira" Mira Buse FS-Mira-Mira Mirano FS
- "Omnibus Mirano" Mirano Hospital-Mira Mirano FS

== See also ==
- Vaporetto
