= Vignoles (surname) =

Vignoles is a surname, and may refer to:

- Anna Vignoles, British educationalist
- Charles Blacker Vignoles (1793–1875), British railway engineer
- Charles Vignoles (priest) (1789–1877), Irish Anglican dean
- Étienne de Vignolles, known as La Hire, French soldier of the Hundred Years' War
- Roger Vignoles (born 1945), British pianist
