= Cavallino-Treporti =

- Comune
- Comune di Cavallino-Treporti
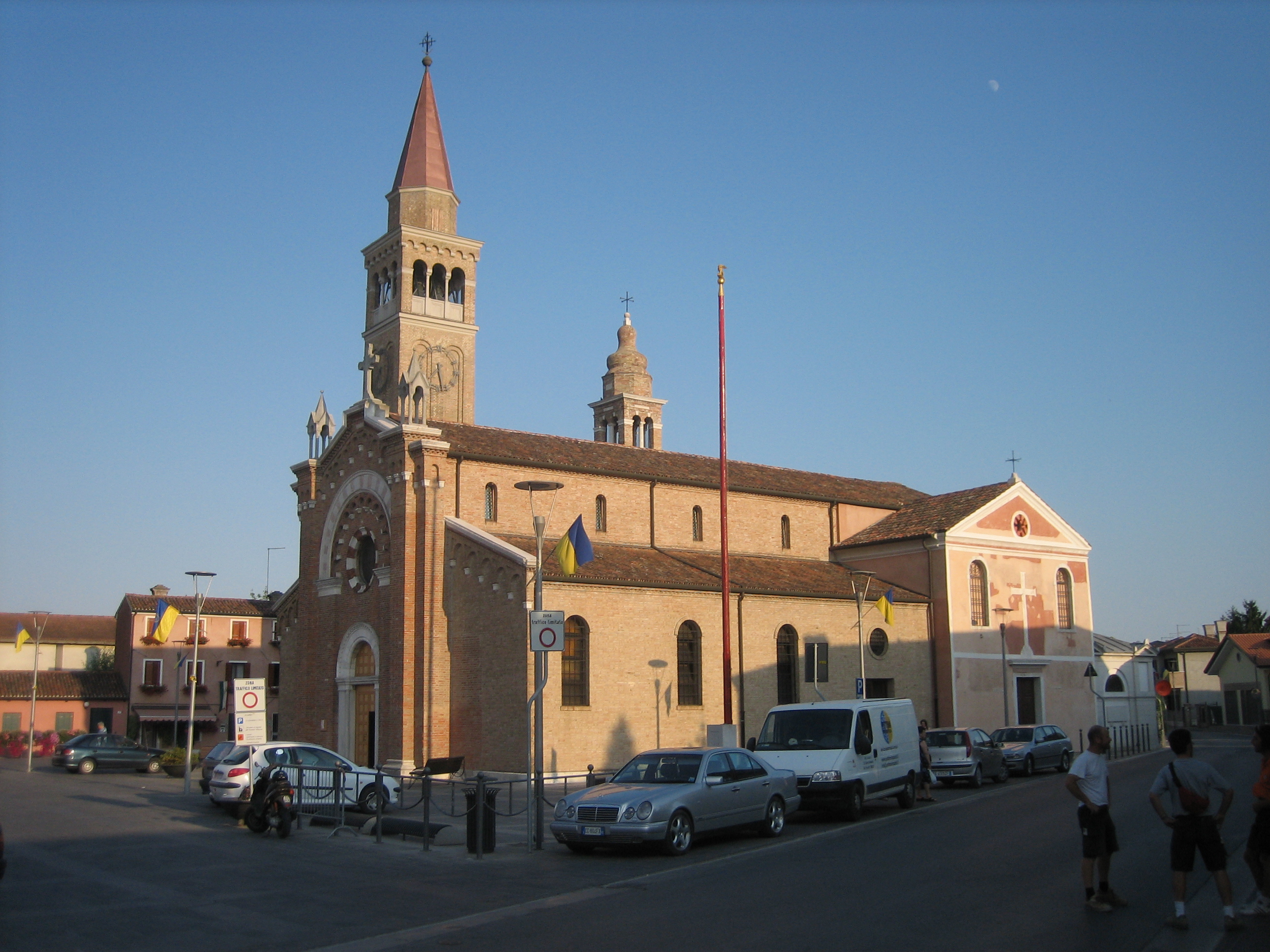
- The church of Treporti.

- Coat of arms

- Location within Italy Location within Veneto
- Coordinates: 45°27′N 12°27′E
- Country: Italy
- Region: Veneto
- Metropolitan city: Venice (VE)
- Frazioni: Ca' Ballarin, Ca' Pasquali, Ca' Savio (communal seat), Ca' di Valle, Ca' Vio, Cavallino, Lio Grando, Lio Piccolo, Mesole, Punta Sabbioni, Saccagnana, Treporti

Government
  - Mayor: Roberta Nesto

Area
  - Total: 44 km^{2} (17 sq mi)
- Elevation: 1 m (3.3 ft)

Population (31 May 2008)
  - Total: 12,897
  - Density: 290/km^{2} (760/sq mi)
- Demonym: Cavallinotti - Treportini
- Time zone: UTC+1 (CET)
  - Summer (DST): UTC+2 (CEST)
- Postal code: 30010, 30013
- Dialing code: 041
- Website: Official website

Cavallino-Treporti is a town and comune in the Metropolitan City of Venice, Veneto, northern Italy.

The commune occupies a peninsula, which divides the Venetian Lagoon from the Adriatic Sea. The river Sile forms the north-eastern boundary with the comune of Jesolo. The comune is composed of several boroughs, including Cavallino, Treporti, Punta Sabbioni and others.

Every year, about 6 million visitors choose Cavallino Treporti for their holidays so the economy of the town is mostly based on tourism, in specific, summer tourism. Thanks to the large number of the visitors, Cavallino is the second most popular seaside resort in Italy. The beach is 15 km (9 3/8 miles) long and near the seaside there are about 30 villages-camps. The hotels are full of tourists from Central and Northern Europe—Germany, Austria, Denmark. In the summer days that are not suitable for bathing, the tourists usually go to Venice and to the islands of the Venetian lagoon (Burano, Torcello, Murano). The islands are easily accessible with boats that leave from Punta Sabbioni terminal and from Treporti-Ricevitoria. The Amalfi Battery, the largest naval artillery battery in northern Italy, is located just outside the entrance to the harbor.

== History ==
Prior to 1999, Cavallino-Treporti was part of the comune of Venice. In 1998 residents voted to separate from Venice, and the separate commune was constituted the following year.
