= Studio Amebe =

Italian artistic duo founded in 2005

Studio AMEBE
- Born: Italy
- Education: Master of Fine Arts, Parsons School of Design, New York
- Known for: Sculpture, installation, performance, collectible design
- Notable work: Cupola (2016); Cupolone (2018); Extra Vergine (2022); Seek to Believe (2022); EVA and EVA – What If? (2024)
- Style: Contemporary art, collectible design, satirical art
- Movement: Contemporary art; Art and design crossover
- Awards: Red Dot Product Design Award (2010); Red Dot Concept Design Award (2013); DNA Design Award (2021)
- Website: studioamebe.com

Studio AMEBE (also known as AMEBE or AMeBE) is an Italian artistic duo founded in 2005 by Alessandra Mantovani and Eleonora Barbareschi. Their practice operates at the intersection of contemporary art, sculpture, performance, and design. Their work frequently engages themes related to power structures, cultural symbolism, and gender narratives.

== History ==
Studio AMEBE was established in 2005 in Italy. The name derives both from the initials of the founders (A+M and B+E) and from the biological term amoeba, derived from Ancient Greek and meaning change or transformation.

Mantovani and Barbareschi both hold a Master of Fine Arts degree from the Parsons School of Design in New York. Their practice draws from Italian cultural heritage, architectural symbolism, and contemporary socio-political themes.

Designer Gaetano Pesce has been cited as a formative influence on their material experimentation and approach to collectible design, stemming from a long-standing collaboration at his New York City workshop beginning in 2011.

== Artistic practice ==
Studio AMEBE's work spans sculpture, installation, performance, and collectible design. Their projects frequently reinterpret architectural, religious, or domestic symbols through contemporary materials and formats.

Recurring themes in their work include:

- reinterpretation of cultural and religious iconography;
- feminist perspectives on domestic and social structures;
- the relationship between functionality and symbolic meaning;
- material experimentation within collectible design.

Their practice frequently blurs distinctions between art objects and design pieces, situating their work within both gallery and design contexts.

== Notable works ==
=== Cupola (2016–ongoing) ===
Cupola is a sculptural lighting series inspired by the dome of St. Peter's Basilica in Rome. First presented during Milan Design Week in 2016, the work was subsequently shown internationally, including at Masterpiece London with David Gill Gallery in 2019 and at The Salon Art + Design at Park Avenue Armory in New York. The work was recognised as a finalist at the Arte Laguna Prize in Venice in 2019.

=== Cupolone (2018) ===
Cupolone is a reinterpretation of the Dome of St. Peter's as a functional design object, produced in collaboration with Seletti. The piece draws from Italian craftsmanship and architectural heritage.

=== Psycho (2017) ===
Psycho is a limited-edition mirror that presents a hyper-realistic reproduction of Caravaggio's Medusa, with the face replaced by a reflective crystal surface. The work was presented at Eccentrici e Solitari, an exhibition curated by Vittorio Sgarbi at the Museo di Palazzo Doebbing, Sutri.

=== Wind Force 12 (2017) ===
Wind Force 12 is a site-specific sculptural installation commissioned for the cruise ship Silver Muse, operated by Silversea Cruises.

=== Extra Vergine (2022) ===
Extra Vergine is an artistic exploration of Mediterranean culture that transforms an everyday oil dispenser into a symbolic functional object, reinterpreting sacred imagery. Produced in collaboration with Bitossi Home, the piece was presented at EDIT Napoli and at Milan Design Week. Extra Vergine received the DNA Design Award in Paris in 2021. The work also appeared in La Repubblica and Gambero Rosso.

=== Seek to Believe (2022) ===
Seek to Believe is a site-specific installation created for the Namibian Pavilion at the 59th Venice Biennale in the context of the exhibition A Bridge to the Desert.
