= Vaporetto =

Public waterbus in Venice, Italy

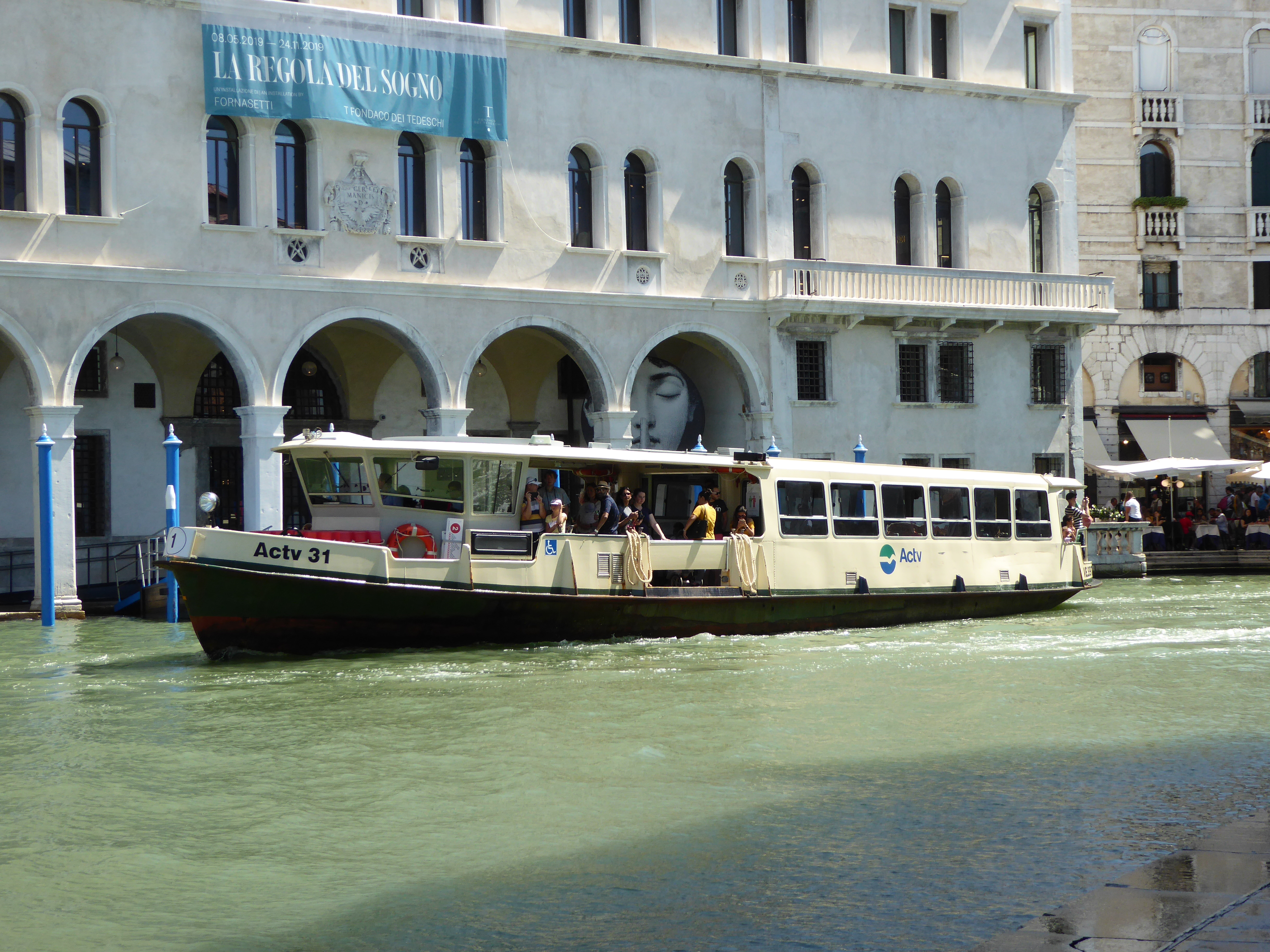
- A series 100 Vaporetto at Fondaco dei Tedeschi on the Grand Canal

Class overview
- Operators: Actv

General characteristics
- Type: Series 90
- Displacement: 25 tons
- Length: 23.93 metres (78.5 ft)
- Beam: 4.22 metres (13.8 ft)
- Height: 1.9 metres (6.2 ft)
- Installed power: 147 kW
- Capacity: 210 passengers
- Crew: 2

The vaporetto is a Venetian public waterbus dedicated to scheduled services in the historic centre of Venice.

== Terminology ==
Strictly speaking, the term vaporetti applies only to the large wide boats used on the slow routes such as 1 and 2 on the Grand Canal. Azienda del Consorzio Trasporti Veneziano (ACTV) operates the following types of vessel in Venice and the Veneto:

- Vaporetti (larger water buses with capacity for 210-220 passengers)
- Motoscafi (smaller water buses with capacity for 154 passengers)
- Motoscafi ad agente unico (single-agent water buses with capacity for 19 passengers)
- Motobattelli Foranei (offshore motor boats with capacity for 330 passengers)
- Motonavi (Foot-passenger ferries with capacity for 1,200 passengers)
- Navi Traghetto (car ferries with capacity for 71 vehicles and 1,250 passengers)

== History ==
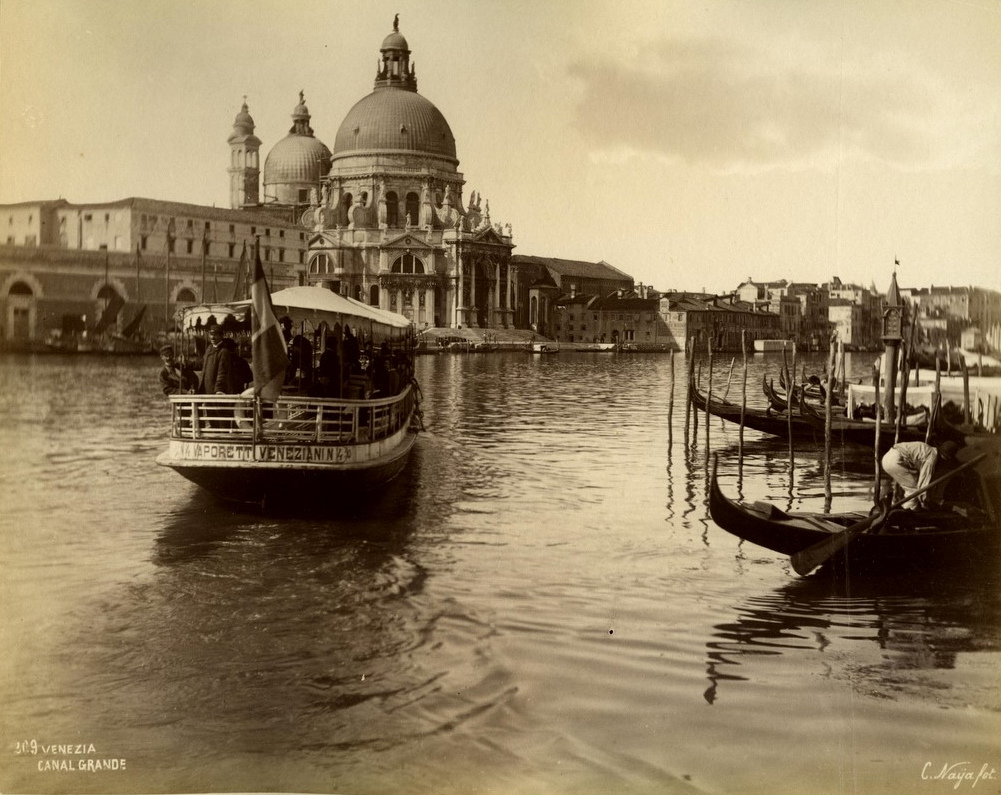
An early photograph from 1881 or 1882

The name vaporetto could be translated as "little steamer", and refers to similarly purposed ships in the past that were run by steam. Venetians call the vaporetto "un batèlo" or "un vaporino". The waterbus line is operated by Azienda del Consorzio Trasporti Veneziano (ACTV), the Venetian public transport system. The vaporetto is necessary in Venice as an underground railway would be impracticable and there is no space for overground trains, leaving the canals as the only viable rapid transport system. Most vaporetti have disability access.

It has 24-hour scheduled service, with frequency varying by the line. Line 1 serves the Grand Canal. Several lines are limited to the summer season, April to October.

The first vaporetto appeared in 1881, in competition with gondoliers and hotel boatmen. The subsequent debate that arose about the first few vaporettos helped shape their role as "Venetian buses", as well as benefiting the gondoliers who continue into the present day as the only ones with access into the smaller waterways.

== Routes ==
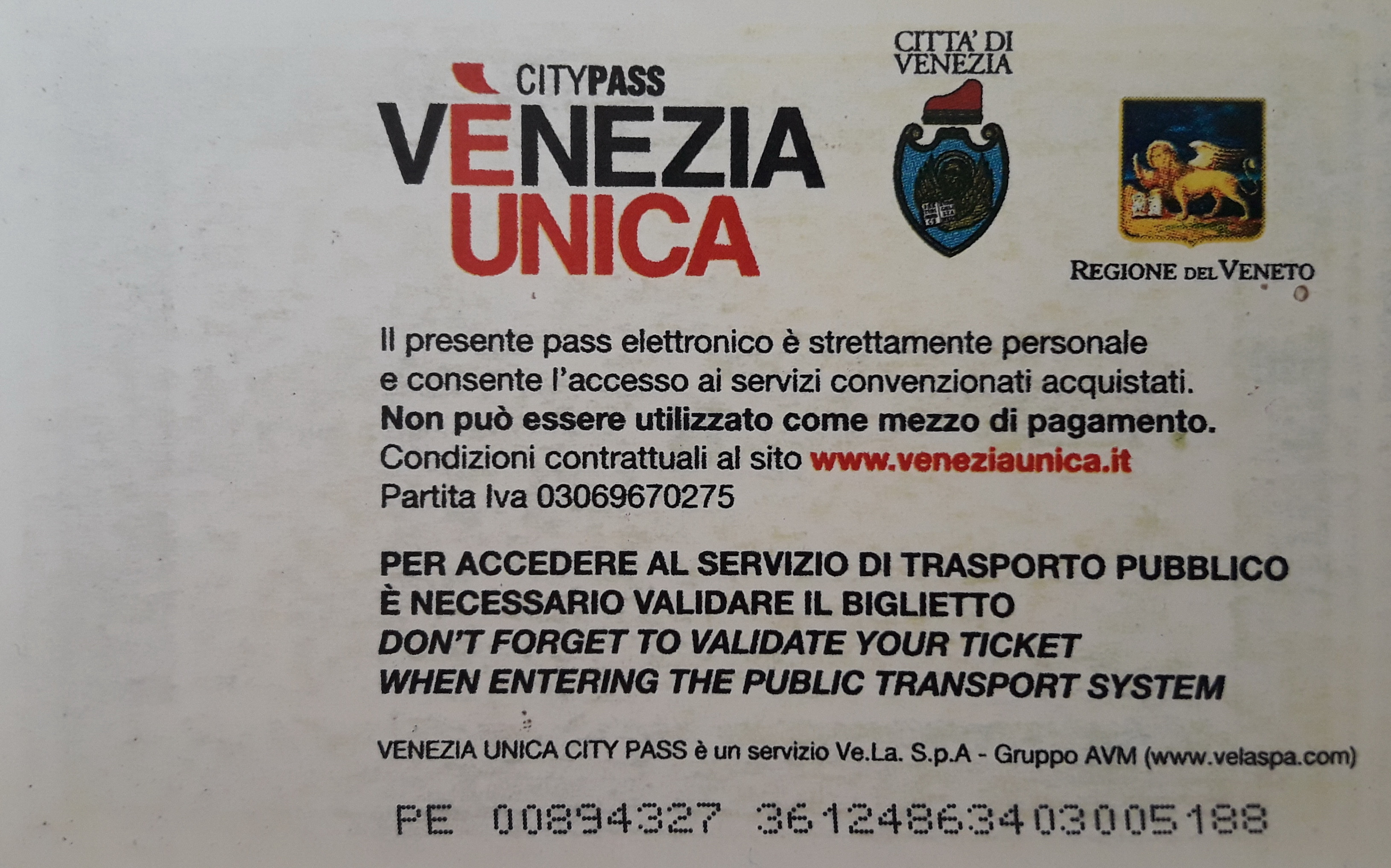
Venezia Unica Card

Vaporetto No. 1 is considered the main tourist route in Venice, since its main part passes along the Grand Canal. Boats start from Piazzale Roma and ends its way on the island of Lido. Route No. 1 stops at each stop along the way. Therefore, it takes up to 45 minutes to cover the distance from Santa Lucia Station to Piazza San Marco. Note that the vaporetto on this route does not stop at the island of San Giorgio Maggiore, despite the fact that the basilica located there is one of the main attractions of Venice.

Vaporetto route 2 is much faster and therefore more convenient. Boats can move both from P. le Roma along the Grand Canal to San Marco and along the Giudecca Canal. In the first case, the boat does not stop at Salute, near the famous church of Santa Maria della Salute, or at the island of San Giorgio Maggiore, in contrast to the number 2 vaporetto coming through the Giudecca Canal.

== See also ==
- Actv
- Motoscafo
