= Amalfi Battery =

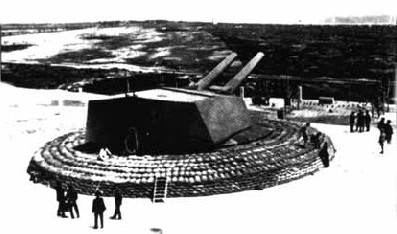
The Amalfi Battery in 1917.

A photo of the Amalfi Battery in 1930.

The Amalfi Battery, sometimes called the Amage Battery, is an Italian artillery battery located to the North of the entrance channel into the Venice Lagoon in Italy. Amalfi was dedicated to the Italian sailors who died when the Italian cruiser Amalfi sank on July 7, 1915. Work was started in September 1915, and ended in February 1917. Amalfi was armed with a Vickers twin 381mm/40 armored turret with a range of 18,900 m (11.8 mi). Amalfi also had six 75 mm anti-aircraft guns mounted on trucks and fourteen 37 mm field guns. Amalfi was the second fort in the world to adopt a fort with a main armament that was in a ship's turret, with the other being Fort Drum outside of Manila in the Philippines. Amalfi was built on 8,000 concrete piles due to the sandy nature of the area. During the disastrous retreat of October and November 1917, Amalfi helped hold nearby bridges over the Piave, and even destroyed the San Dona Bridge before the Austro-Hungarians could cross it. Amalfi played an offensive role in the Second Battle of the Piave, sometimes known as the Battle of the Solstice. In World War II, Amalfi and the nearby Pisani Battery conducted a firefight with two British corvettes. Amalfi's cost was exorbitant for the time, nearly 18 million Lire ($3 million dollars US dollars then, US$99 million today), and each shell cost 5,000 Lire (US$826 then, $27,000 today). As of February 10, 1944, Amalfi's crew was 5 officers, 10 NCOs, and 133 enlisted men.
