= Punta Sabbioni =

Coordinates: 45.4475°N 12.4253°E

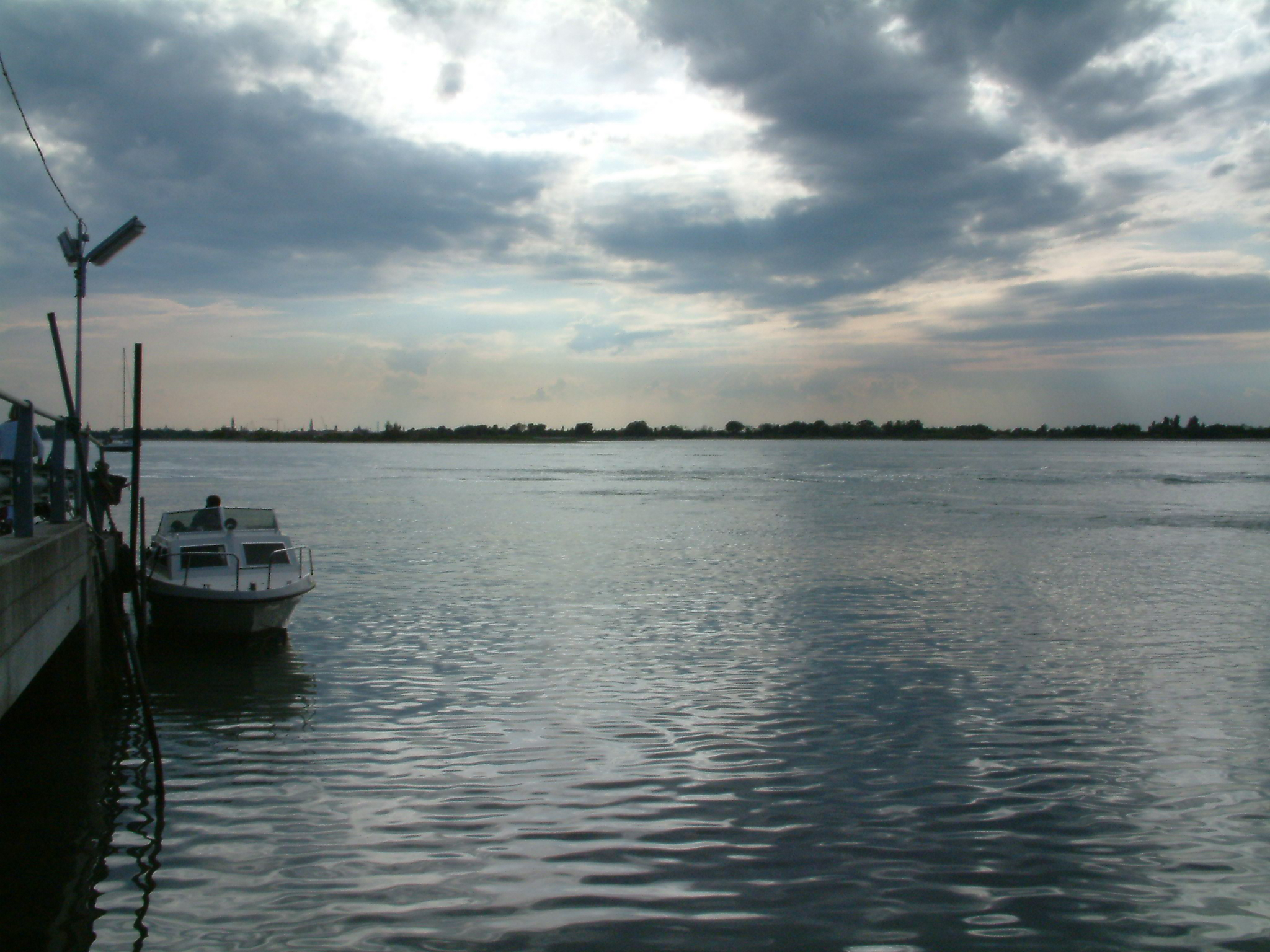
Punta Sabbioni

Punta Sabbioni is a hamlet (frazione) in the municipality of Cavallino-Treporti, near Venice, Italy. It is located at the southern end of Cavallino, a peninsula which separates the Venetian Lagoon from the Adriatic Sea. Punta Sabbioni is approximately 10 km away from Venice by boat. There is Actv ferry service between Punta Sabboni and Venice, as well as ferry service to Lido.

Landmarks include a lighthouse, Faro di Punta Sabbioni, which was constructed between 1882 and completed in 1910.

== Gallery ==
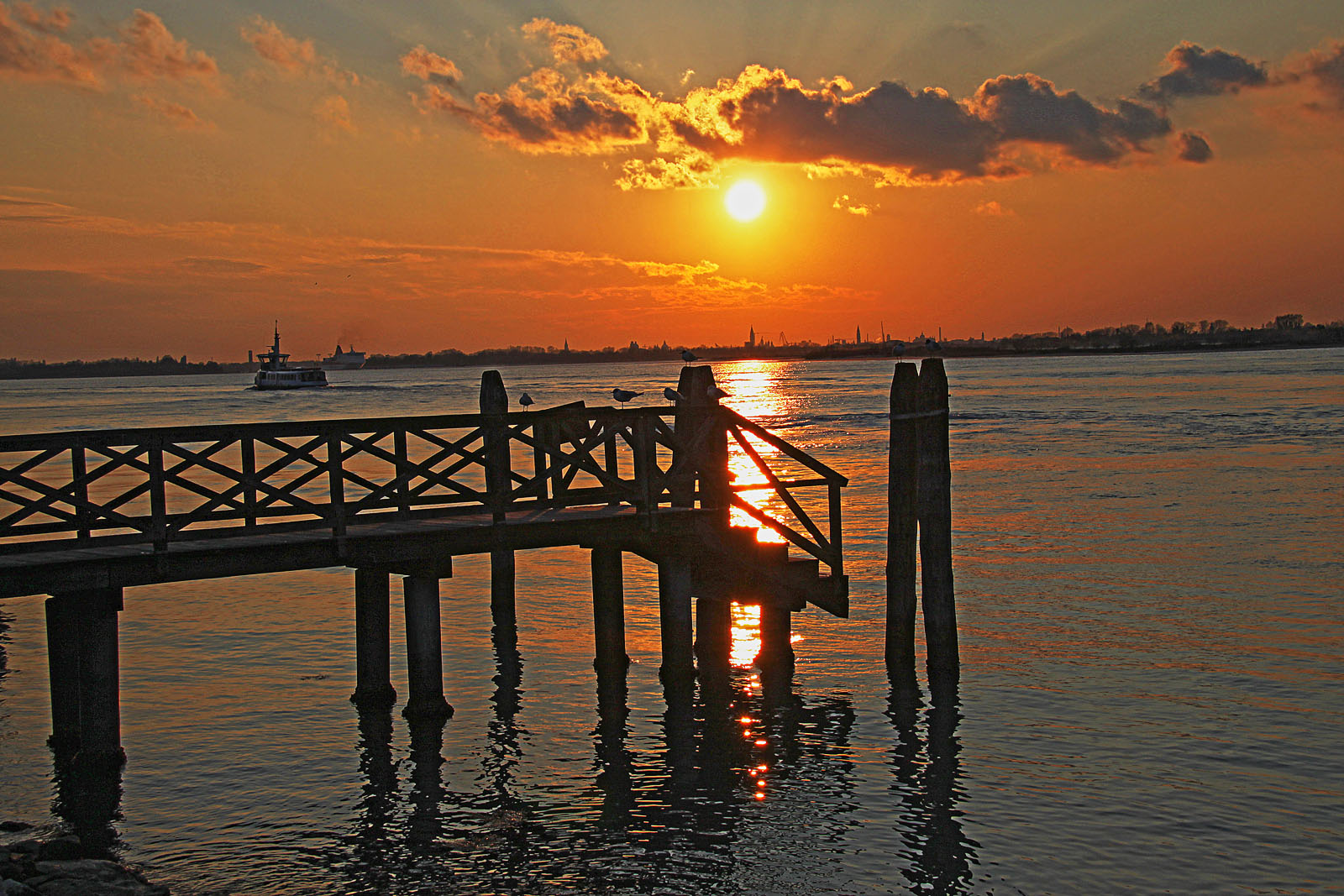
Sunset

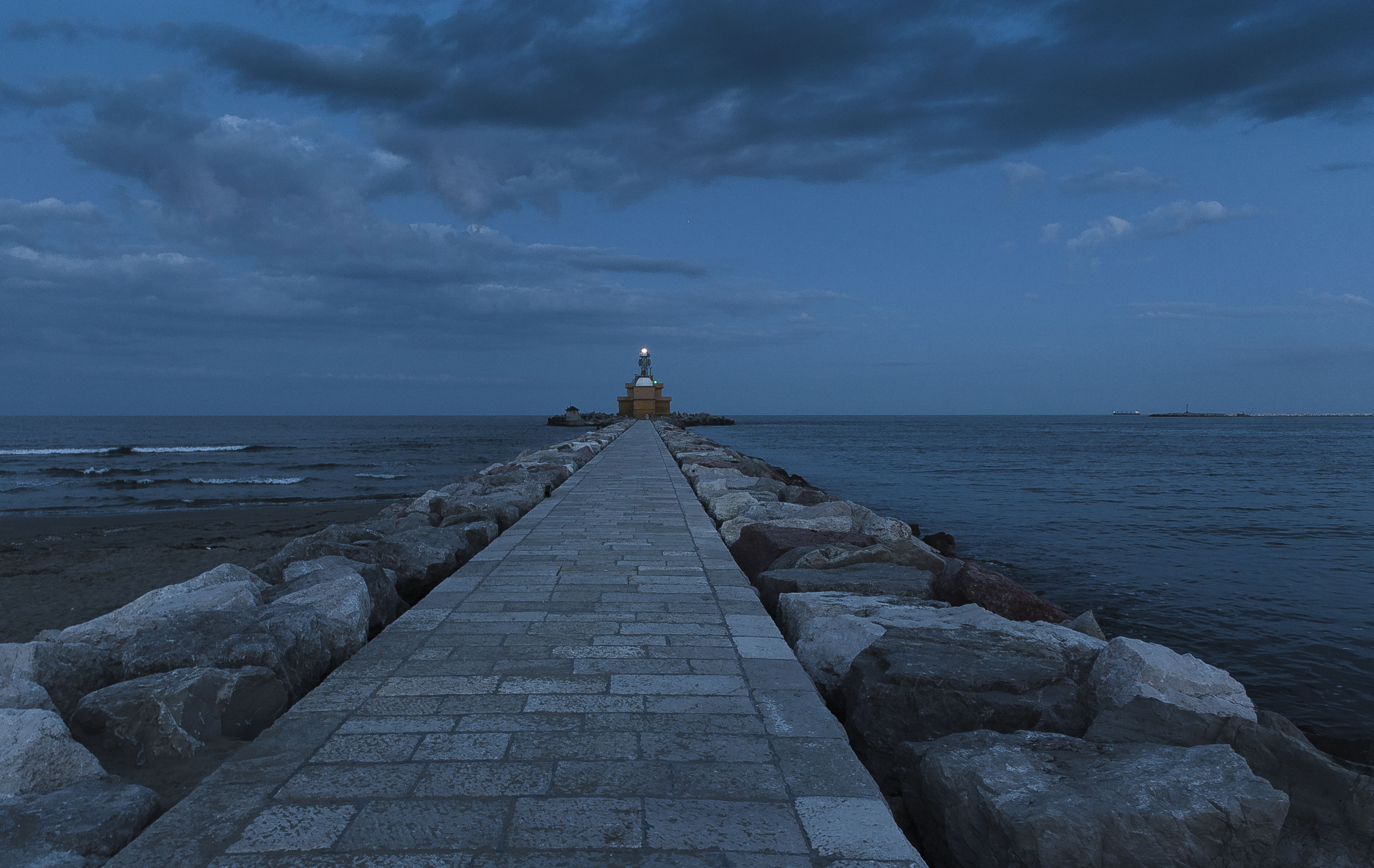
Lighthouse
