= Palazzo Salviati =

Palazzo Salviati may refer to:

- Palazzo Salviati (Dorsoduro), a palace in Venice
- Palazzo Salviati (Rome), a palace in Rome
- Palazzo Salviati-Borghese, a palace in Florence
