= San Barnaba, Venice =

Roman Catholic church in Venice, Italy

Chiesa di San Barnaba; Church of Saint Barnabas
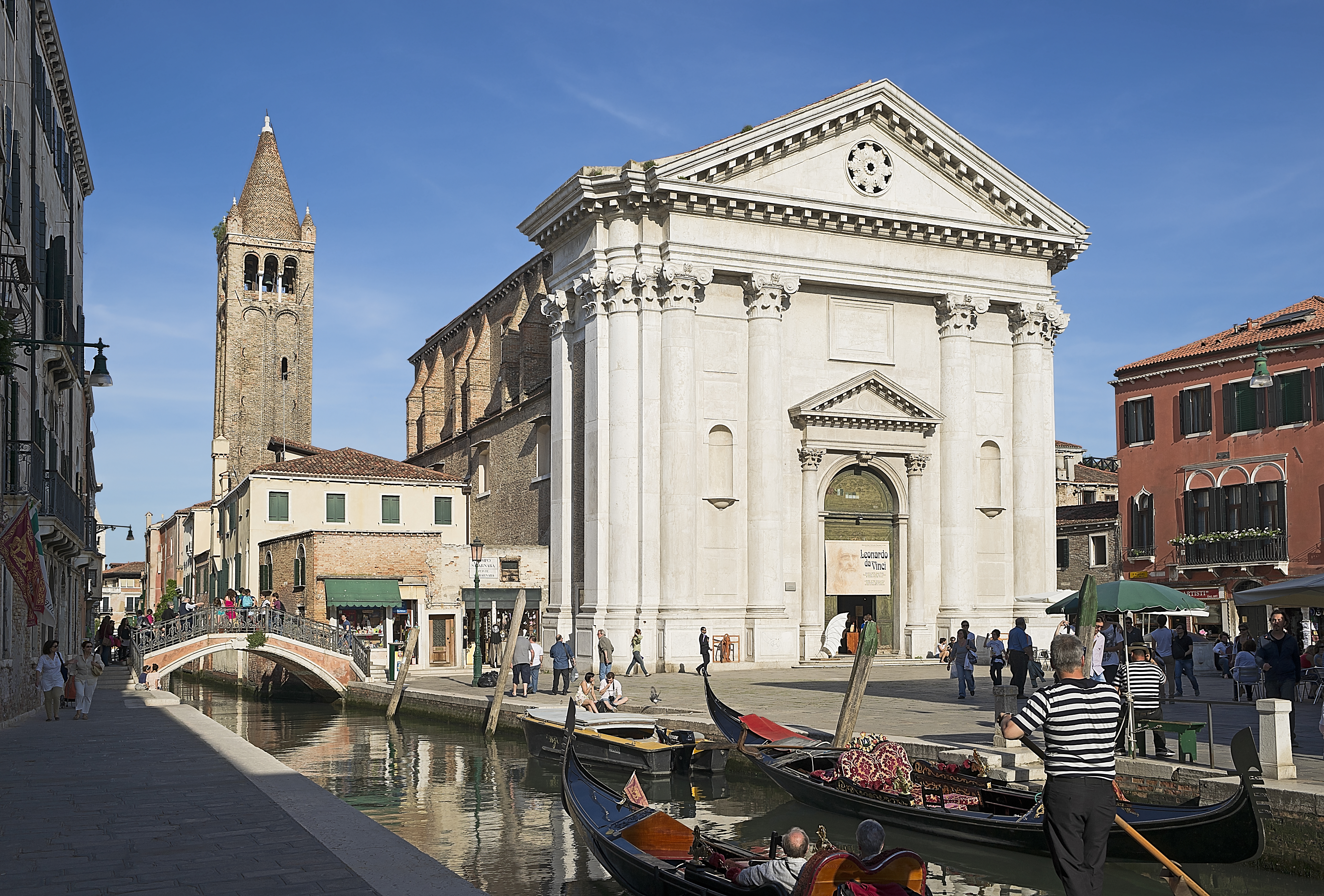
- Façade and bell-tower of San Barnaba

- Location within Venice

Religion
- Affiliation: Roman Catholic

Location
- Municipality: Venice
- Country: Italy
- Coordinates: 45.4331°N 12.3254°E

Architecture
- Architect: Lorenzo Boschetti
- Type: Church
- Style: Neoclassical
- Groundbreaking: 18th century

The Chiesa di San Barnaba is a neoclassical church in the district of Dorsoduro in Venice, Italy. It is dedicated to the Apostle Saint Barnabas.

== History ==
A church at the site was built in the ninth century, but destroyed by fire in 1105. Rebuilt in 1350, it was reconstructed in its present form in 1776 by Lorenzo Boschetti under the patronage of the Grimani family. The 11th-century campanile, detached from the main body of the church, has a pine-cone shaped spire from the 1300's. To the left of the church was the entrance to the Casin dei Nobili (Casino of the Aristocracy), which was an active gambling house in the 18th century. The church is now deconsecrated and used for exhibitions.

The 1989 film Indiana Jones and the Last Crusade featured scenes shot in the Campo San Barnaba, using the facade of the church to depict a fictional library.
