= Giudecca Canal =

Canal in Venice, Italy

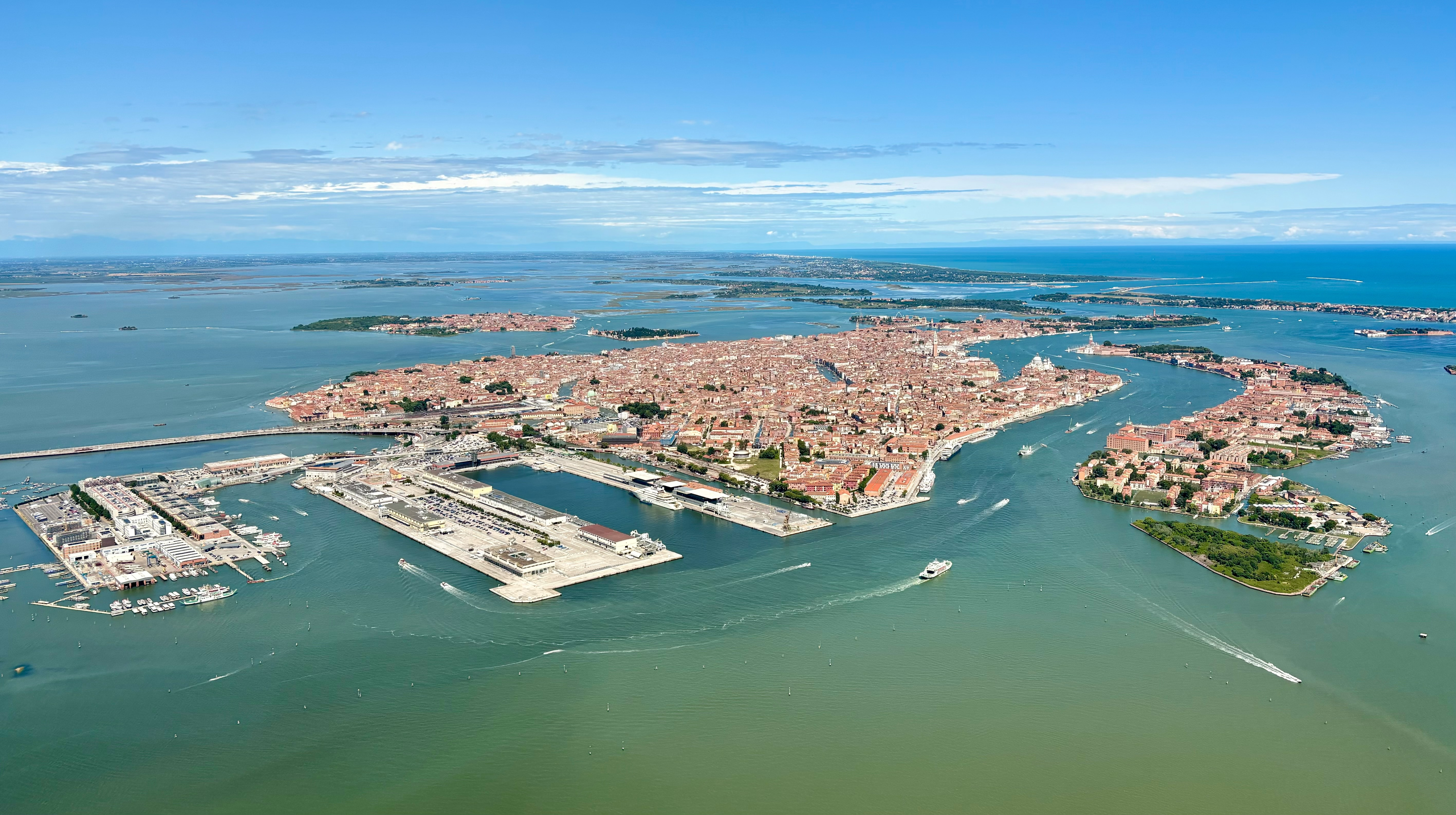
- Aerial view of Venice with the Giudecca Canal on the right
- Interactive map of Giudecca Canal
- Location: Venice, Italy

Specifications
- Length: 4 km (2.5 miles)

Geography
- Direction: East
- Beginning coordinates: 45.433°N 12.303°E
- Ending coordinates: 45.431°N 12.341°E

The Giudecca Canal (Venetian: Canal de ła Zueca) is a body of water that flows into the San Marco basin in Venice, Italy.

It is one of the major canals in the city, it bisects the sestieri of Dorsoduro, separating Giudecca island and district from Dorsoduro district. It can be reached by the vaporetto from San Marco.

== Landmarks ==
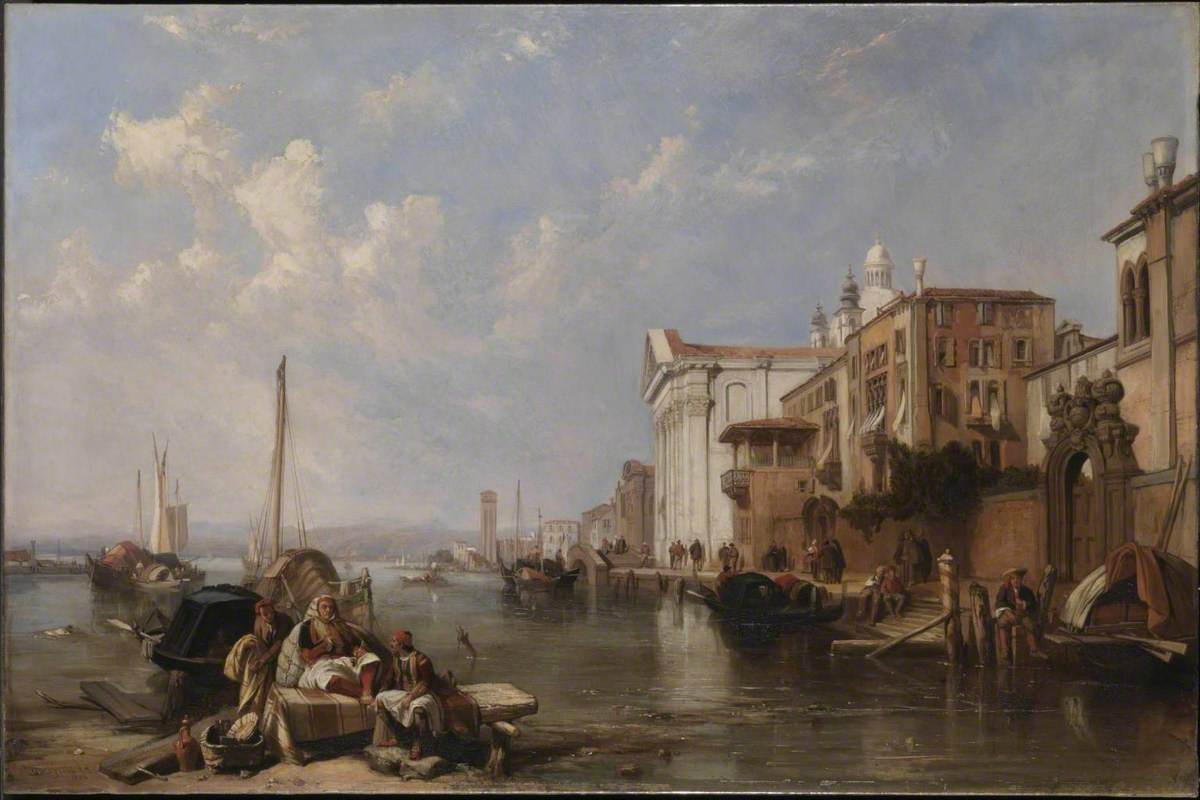
The Canal of the Guidecca, and the Church of the Gesuati, Venice by Clarkson Stanfield, 1836

Multiple churches line the canal. Significant buildings along the canal include:

- Along the Giudecca district quay, Molino Stucky (a 19th-century factory complex), Le Zitelle church, and the Il Redentore church by Palladio.
- Along the Dorsoduro district side: Il Gesuati church on the Zattere quay, and at Punta della Dogana where Giudecca Canal and the Grand Canal meet, the Santa Maria della Salute church and Dogana da Mar, a former customs house and present day art museum−gallery.
- Palazzo Giustinian Recanati

== See also ==
- Dorsoduro−related topics
