= Giudecca =

Island in the Venetian Lagoon, Italy

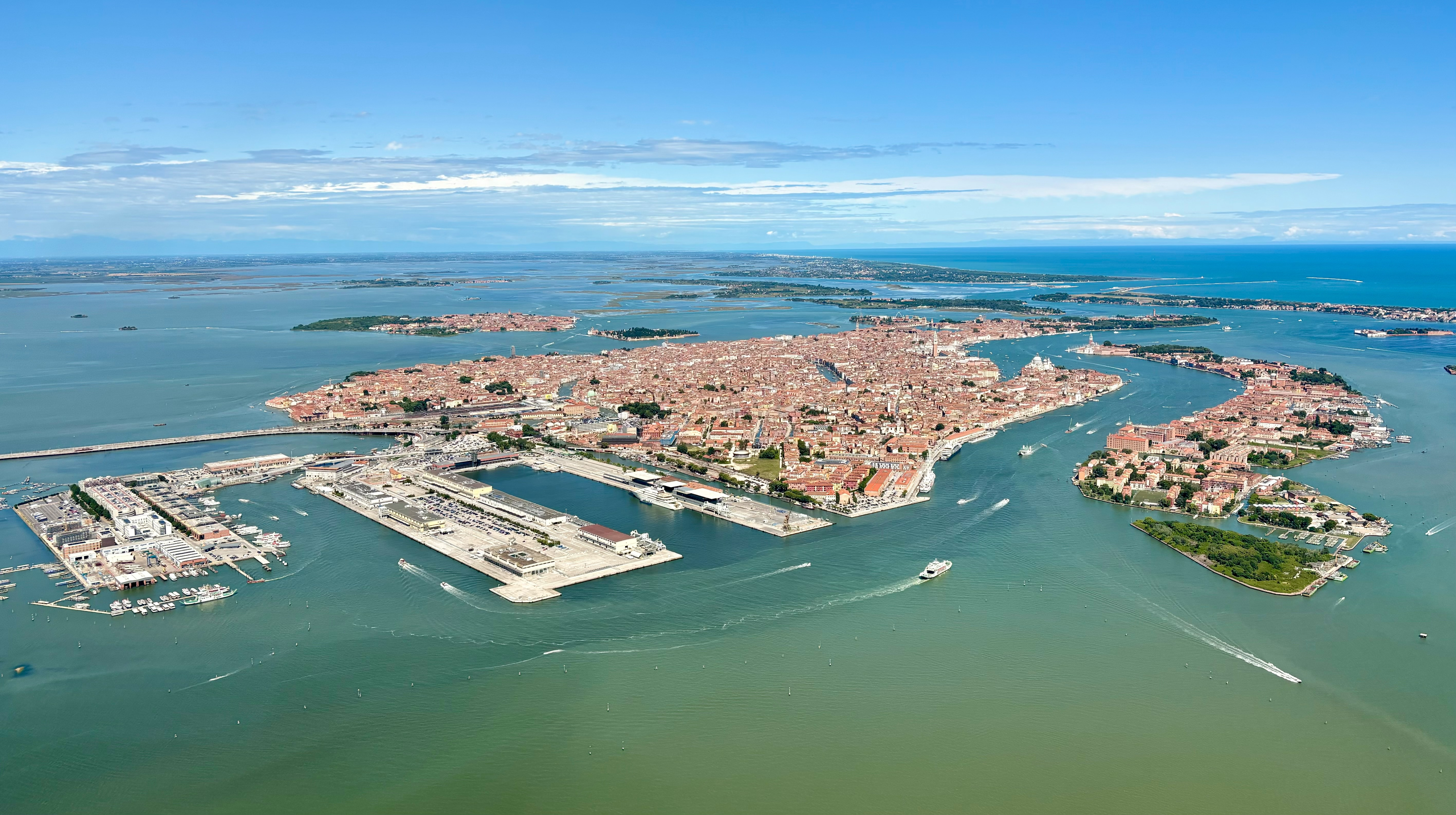
- Aerial view of Venice; Giudecca island on the right on the other side of Giudecca Canal

- Location within Venetian Lagoon

Geography
- Coordinates: 45.425142°N 12.326482°E
- Adjacent to: Venetian Lagoon

Administration
- Italy
- Comune: Venice

Giudecca (Italian: [dʒuˈdɛkka]; Venetian: Zueca) is an island in the Venetian Lagoon, in northern Italy. It is part of the sestiere of Dorsoduro and is a locality of the comune of Venice.

== Geography ==
Giudecca lies immediately south of the central islands of Venice, from which it is separated by the Giudecca Canal. San Giorgio Maggiore lies off its eastern tip.

== History ==
Giudecca was known in ancient times as the Spinalunga (meaning "Long Thorn"). The name Giudecca may represent a corruption of the Latin "Judaica" ("Judaean") and so may be translated as "the Jewry": a number of towns in Southern Italy and Sicily have Jewish quarters named Giudecca or Judeca. Venice historian John Julius Norwich writes in the 1989 edition of his book, A History of Venice: “…by the middle of the thirteenth century there was already a considerable Jewish population in the city and its immediate neighborhood—perhaps 3,000 or more. Many lived at Mestre, on the mainland; others —particularly those who had mercantile dealings with Dalmatia—occupied the island of Spinalunga and were in fact responsible for its change of name to Giudecca.” However, the term "Giudecca" was not generally used to denote the Jewish quarters of towns in northern Italy.

It wasn't until 1516 that the first segregated Jewish quarter in Europe, called the New Foundry, or "Ghetto Nuovo", was established in the Cannaregio district in Venice. Jews were required to live in a confined area and were subject to various restrictions. The term "ghetto" itself originated from this Venetian district.

Giudecca was historically an area of large palaces with gardens. In the early 20th century, the island became an industrial zone with shipyards, factories, and a film studio. Much of the industry went into decline after World War II, and Giudecca is now again regarded as a quiet residential area, largely characterized by working-class housing with some chic apartments and exclusive houses. It is known for its long dock and its churches, including the Palladio-designed Il Redentore. The island was the home of a huge flour mill, the Molino Stucky, which has been converted into a luxury hotel and apartment complex. At the opposite end of Giudecca stands the five-star Cipriani hotel, noted for its extensive private gardens and saltwater pool.

=== Resort town ===
Modern renovations of some antique architecture in Giudecca have bolstered the island's reputation as a vacation locale. In 2011, Venetian developers reopened the lodgings of a prominent 16th-century mansion as long-term rentals under the name "Villa F."

== Gallery ==
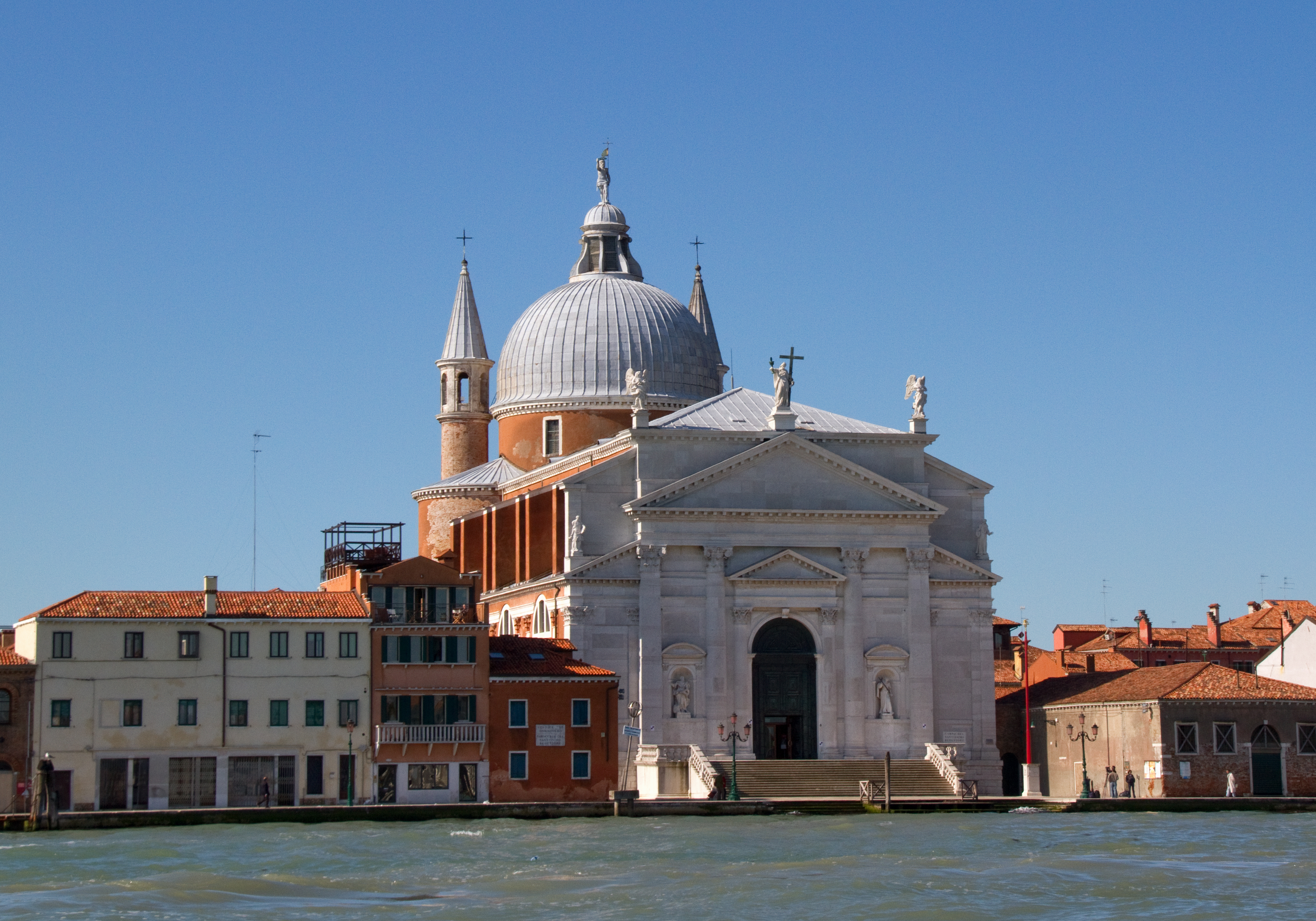
Il Redentore church

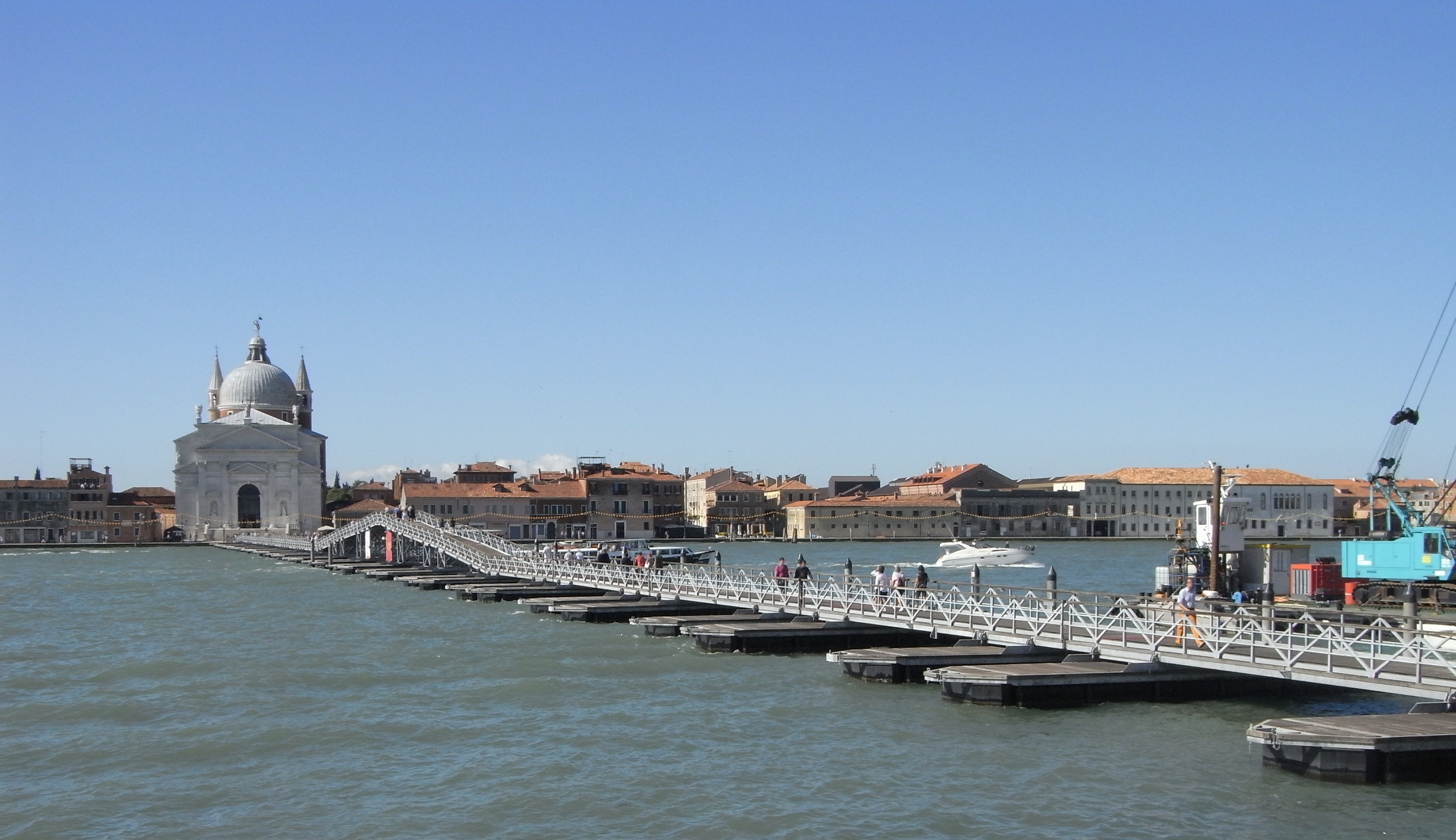
The pier that connects Giudecca with Venice during the Festa del Redentore in July

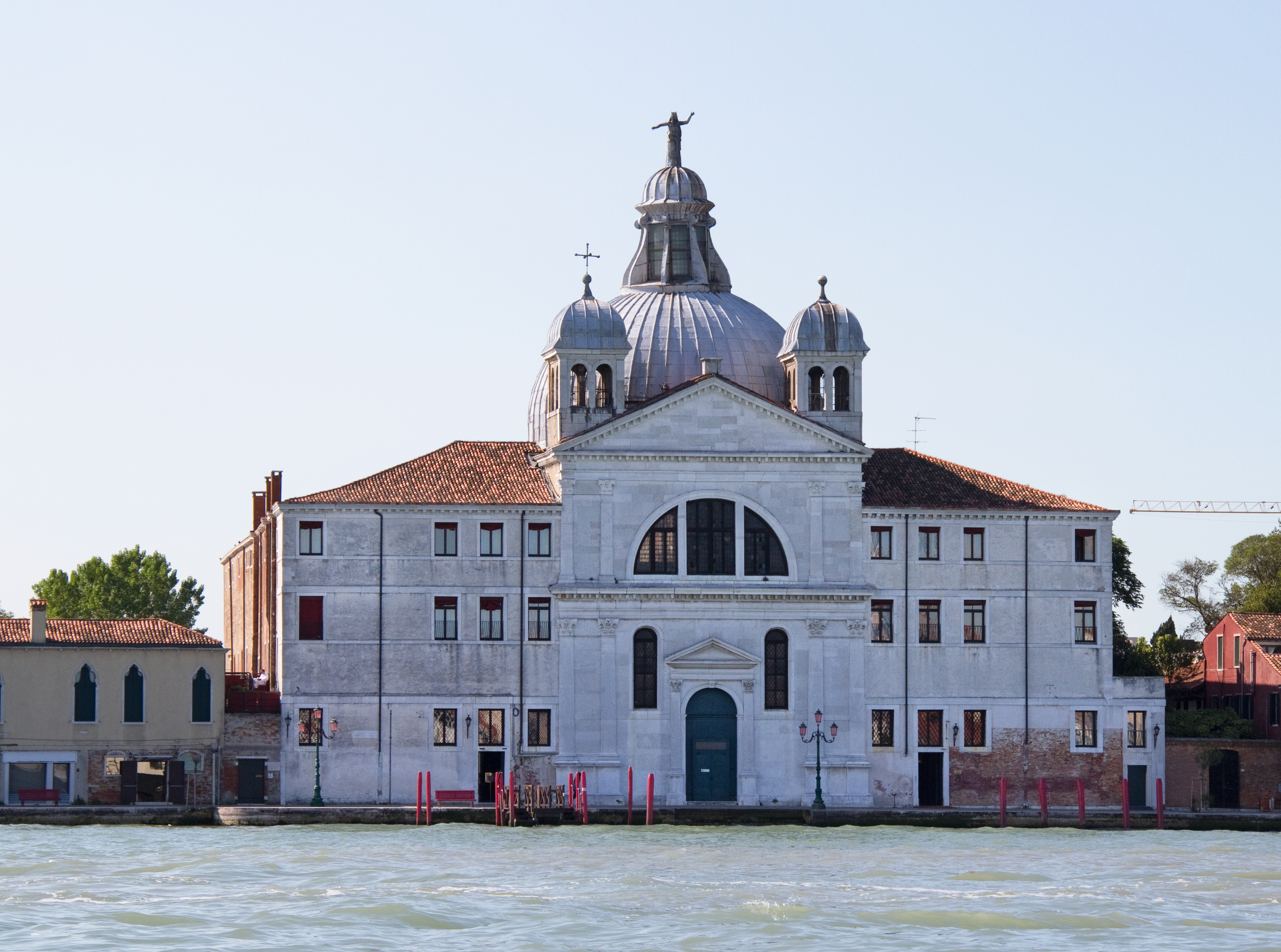
Le Zitelle church

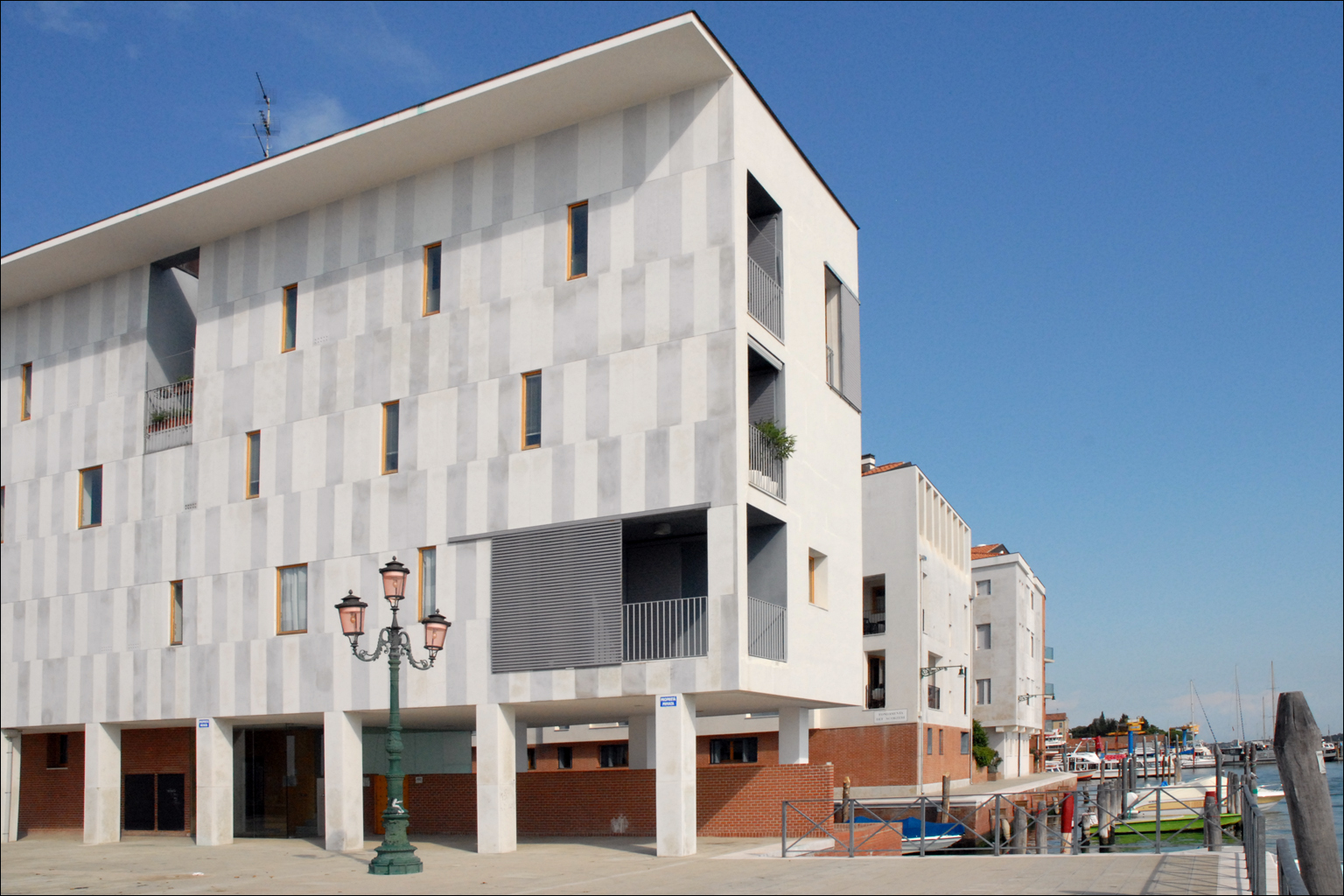
The modern Junghans quarter

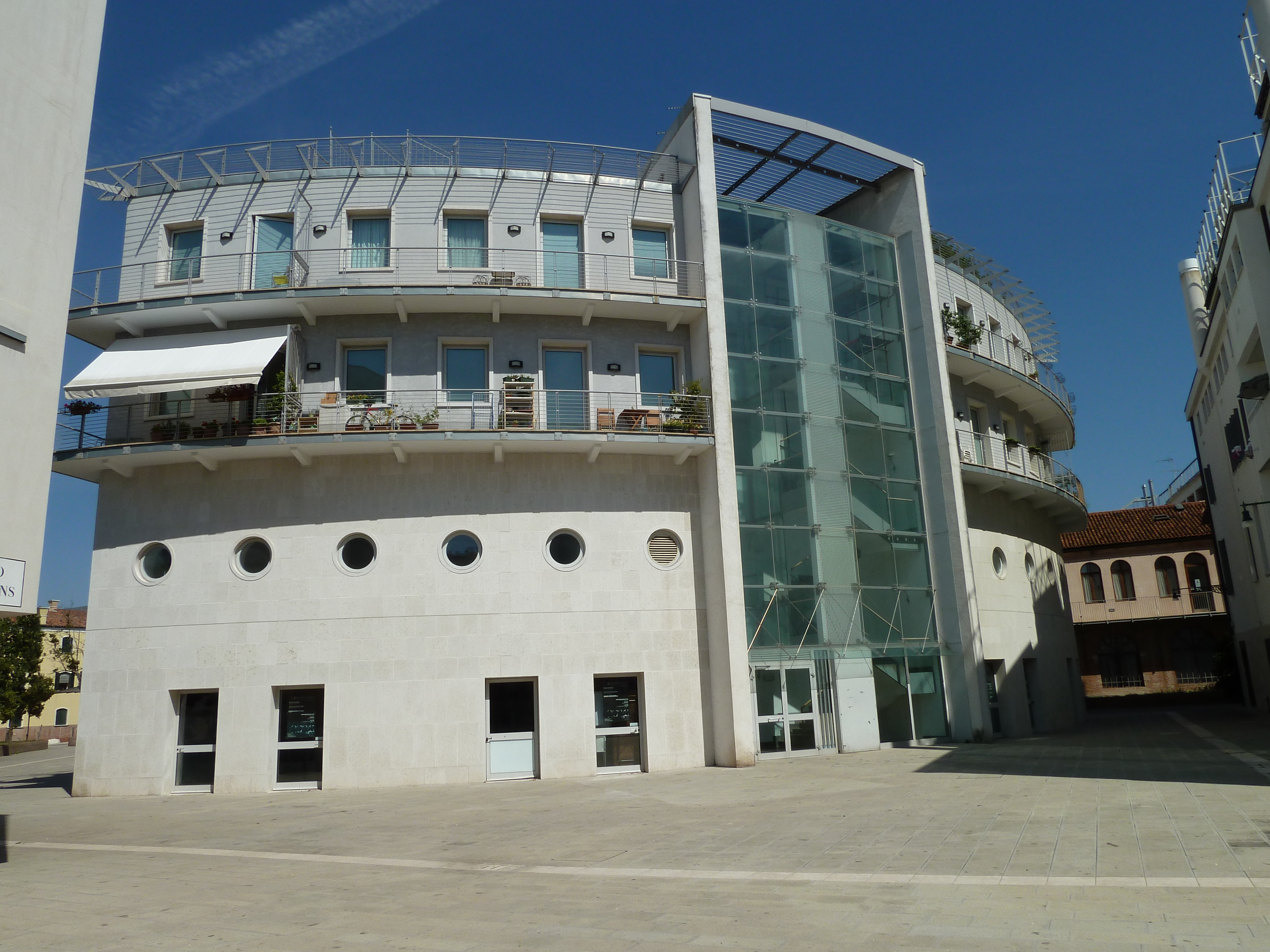
Junghans contemporary theater, seat of the Venetian Theatrical Academy

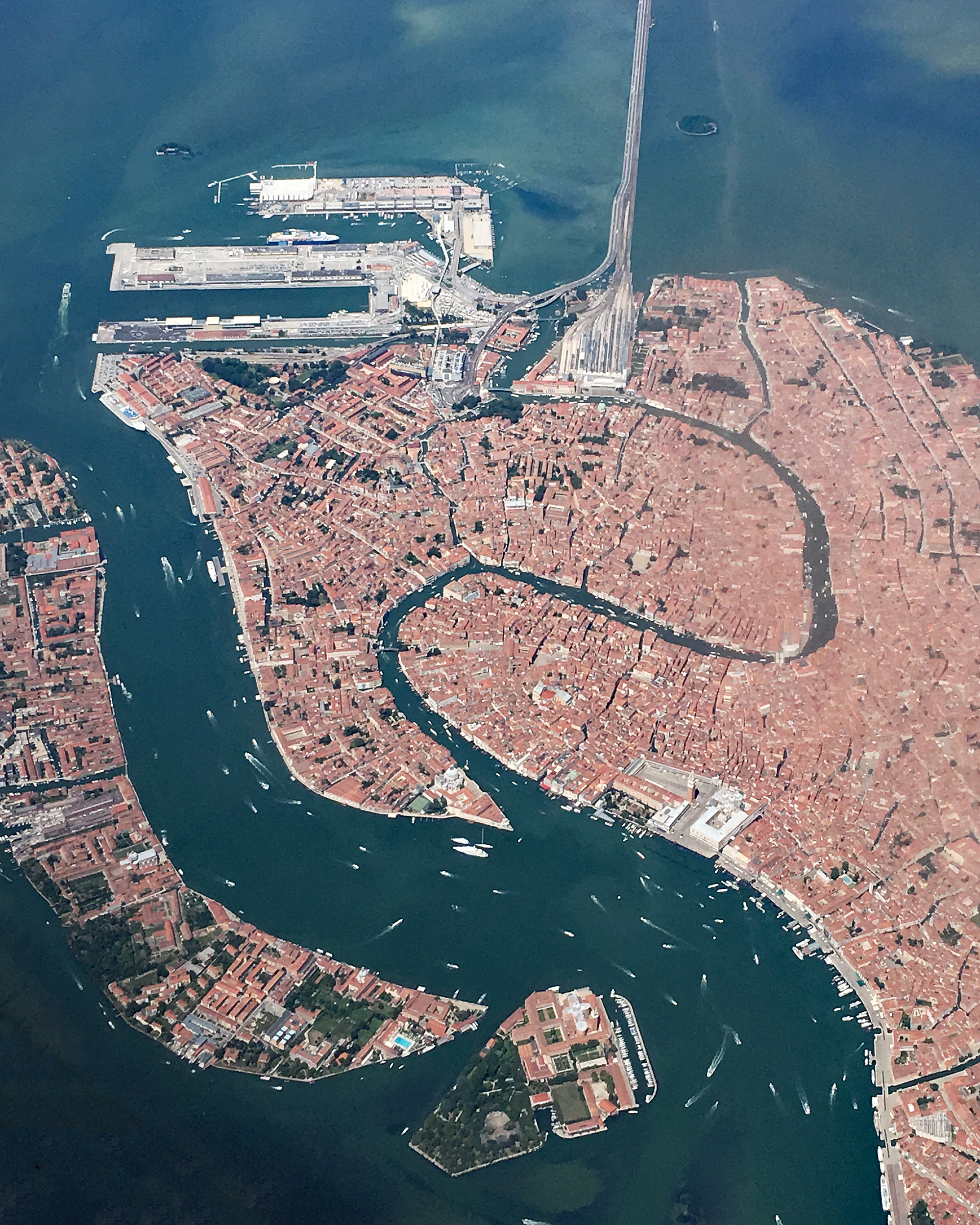
Aerial view of the Giudecca Canal (left)

== See also ==
- List of islands of Italy
