= Ponte dell'Accademia =

Bridge over the Canal Grande, Venice, Italy

Ponte dell'Accademia Ponte dell'Accademia
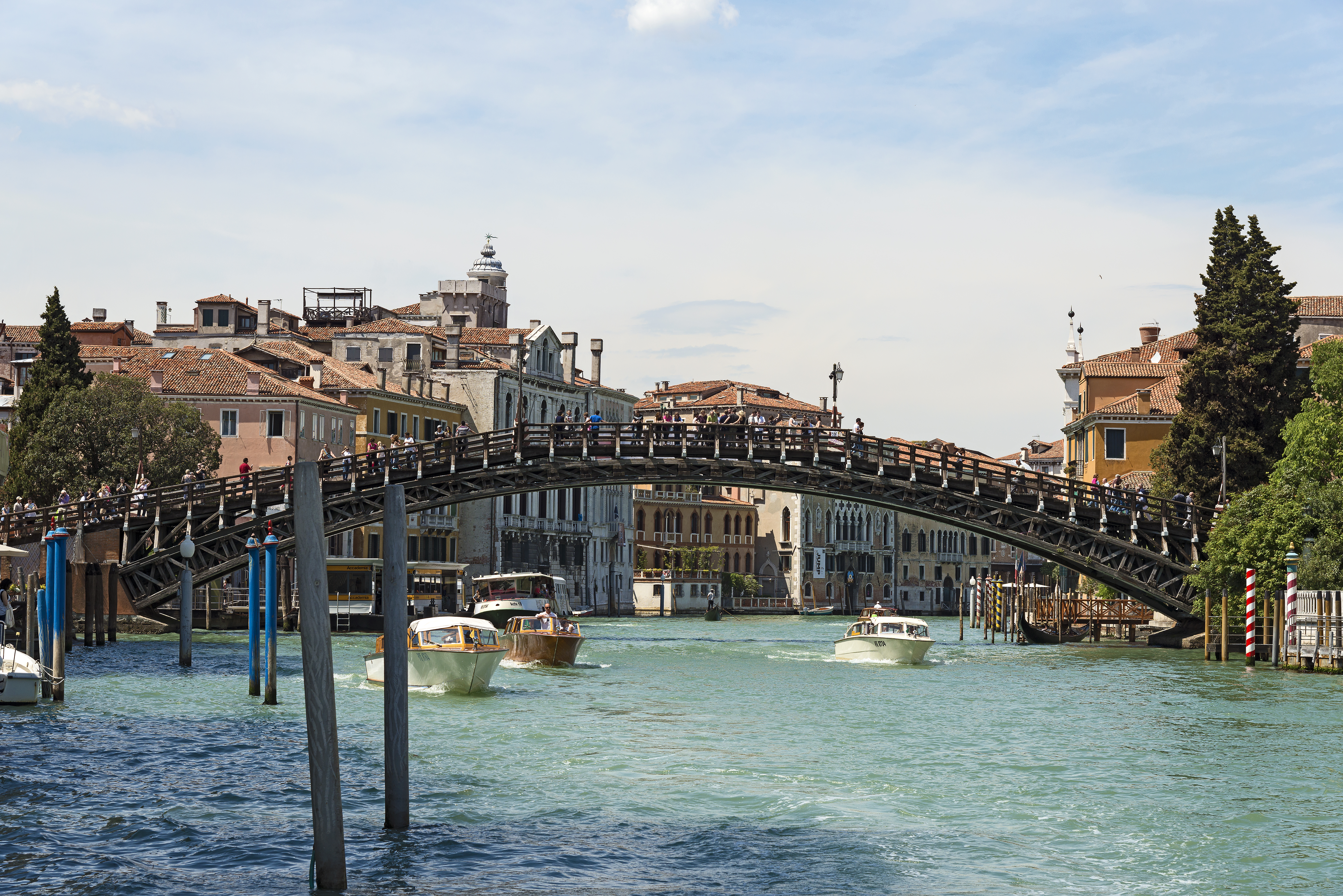
- Coordinates: 45°25′54″N 12°19′44″E
- Carried: Pedestrians
- Crossed: Grand Canal
- Locale: Venice, Italy
- Began: San Marco
- Ended: Dorsoduro
- Named for: Accademia di Belle Arti di Venezia

Characteristics
- Design: Arch bridge
- Material: Wood (current); Steel (original)

History
- Designer: Eugenio Miozzi (1933 replacement); Alfred Neville (1854 original)
- Opened: 20 November 1854 (original); 1933 (current)
- Demolished: Original steel bridge demolished circa 1933

Location
- Interactive map of Ponte dell'Accademia

The Ponte dell'Accademia is one of only four bridges to span the Grand Canal in Venice, Italy. It crosses near the southern end of the canal, and is named for the Accademia di Belle Arti di Venezia, which from 1807 to 2004 was housed in the Scuola della Carità together with the Gallerie dell'Accademia, which is still there. The bridge links the sestieri of Dorsoduro and San Marco.

A bridge on the site was first suggested as early as 1488. The provveditore Luca Tron proposed in the council to build two bridges across the Grand Canal, one here and the other at Santa Sofia. The members of the council, however, laughed at him, and the motion was not even put to the vote. The original steel structure, designed by Alfred Neville, opened on 20 November 1854, but was demolished and replaced by a wooden bridge designed by Eugenio Miozzi and opened in 1933, despite widespread hopes for a stone bridge.

Lovers have attempted to attach padlocks ("love locks") to the metal hand rails of the bridge, but Venetian authorities have successfully cracked down on this.

== Gallery ==
Ponte dell'Accademia with the Accademia vaporetto station visible in the background

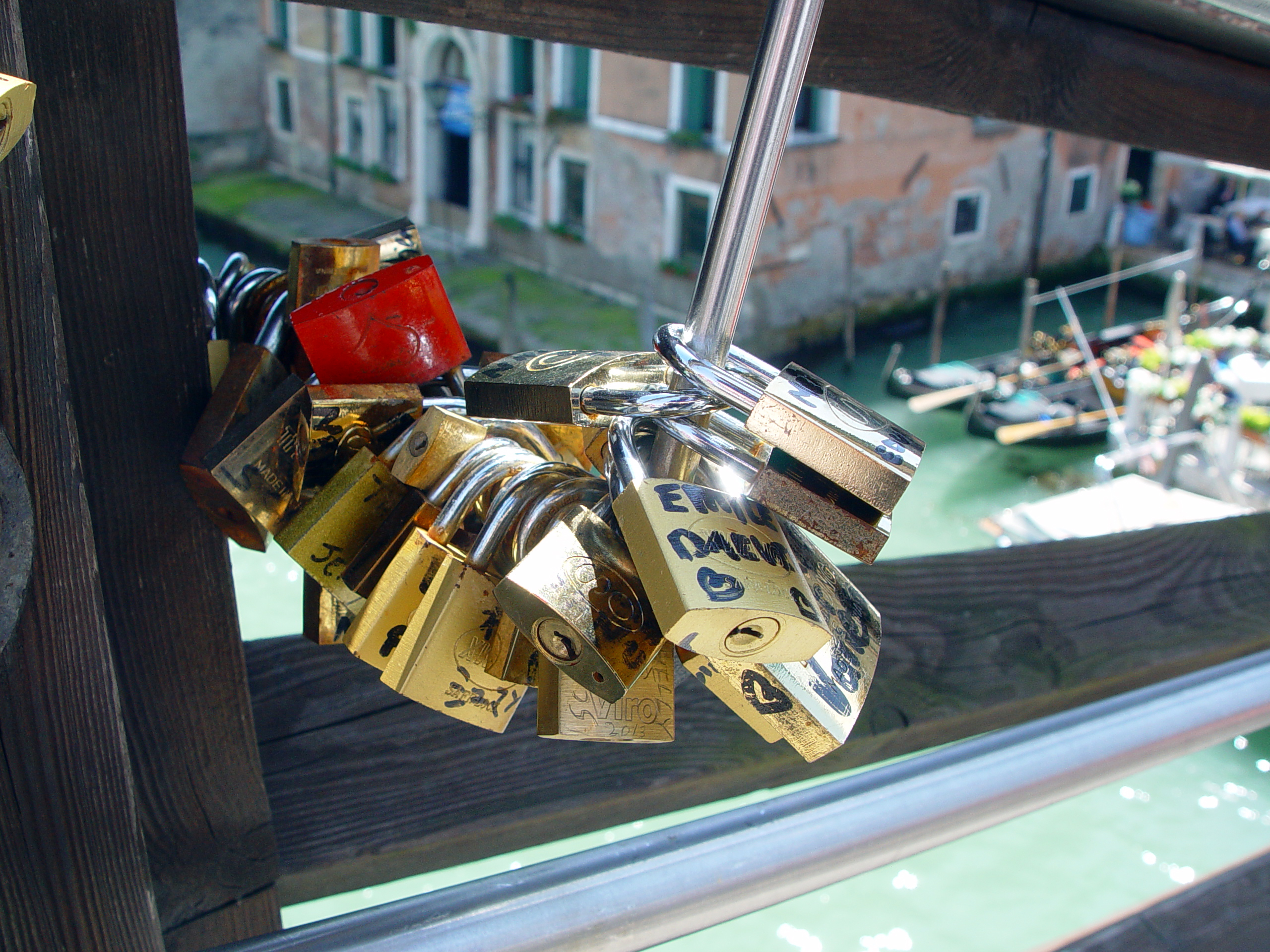
Love padlock talismans at Ponte dell'Accademia
