= Palazzo Orio Semitecolo Benzon =

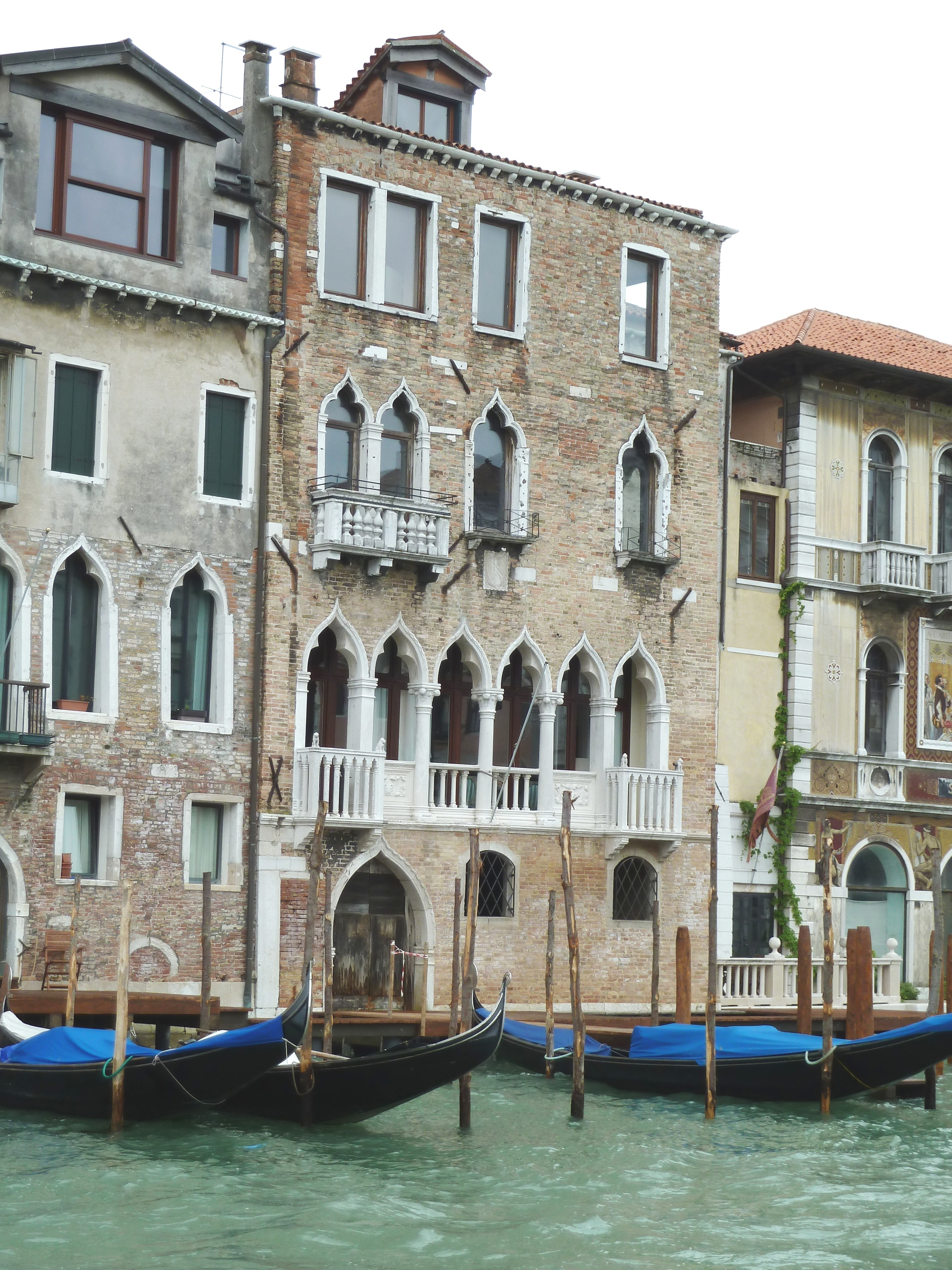
- Palazzo Orio Semitecolo Benzon

General information
- Type: Residential
- Architectural style: Gothic
- Location: Dorsoduro district, Venice, Italy
- Coordinates: 45°25′51.22″N 12°19′58.48″E
- Construction stopped: 14th century

Technical details
- Floor count: 4 levels

Palazzo Orio Semitecolo Benzon is a Gothic palace in Venice, Italy, built in the 14th century. The palazzo is located in the Dorsoduro district and overlooks the Grand Canal between Casa Santomaso and Casa Salviati.

== History ==
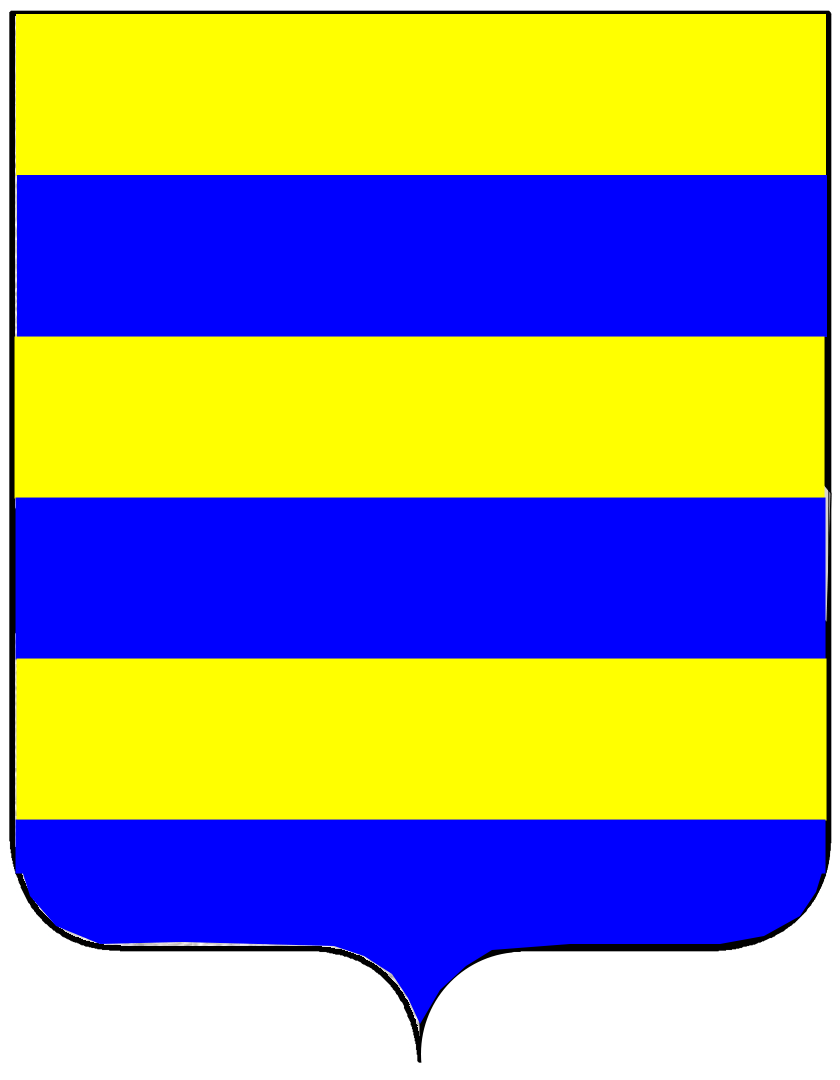
Coat of arms of Orio family

Built by the Orio family of ancient nobility, the palace was united with Palazzo Salviati when it was built during the 20th century.

In 1893, the American novelist Constance Fenimore Woolson rented an apartment in the palace. Suffering from influenza and depression, she either jumped or fell to her death from a fourth floor window in the apartment in January 1894, surviving for about an hour after the fall.

== Architecture ==
The facade, mainly characterized by Gothic forms of the 14th and 15th centuries, has different features on each floor. The first noble floor has a hexafora composed of four balustrated windows and two side monoforas supported by pillars and projecting balconies. The second noble floor has a bifora, supported by a projecting balcony, on the left and two monoforas on the right. The top floor was added in the 19th century and is rather featureless. The water portal has a dentiled frame and bears a shield of the Benzoni family, dating back to the 14-15th centuries and made of the Istrian stone.

== Gallery ==
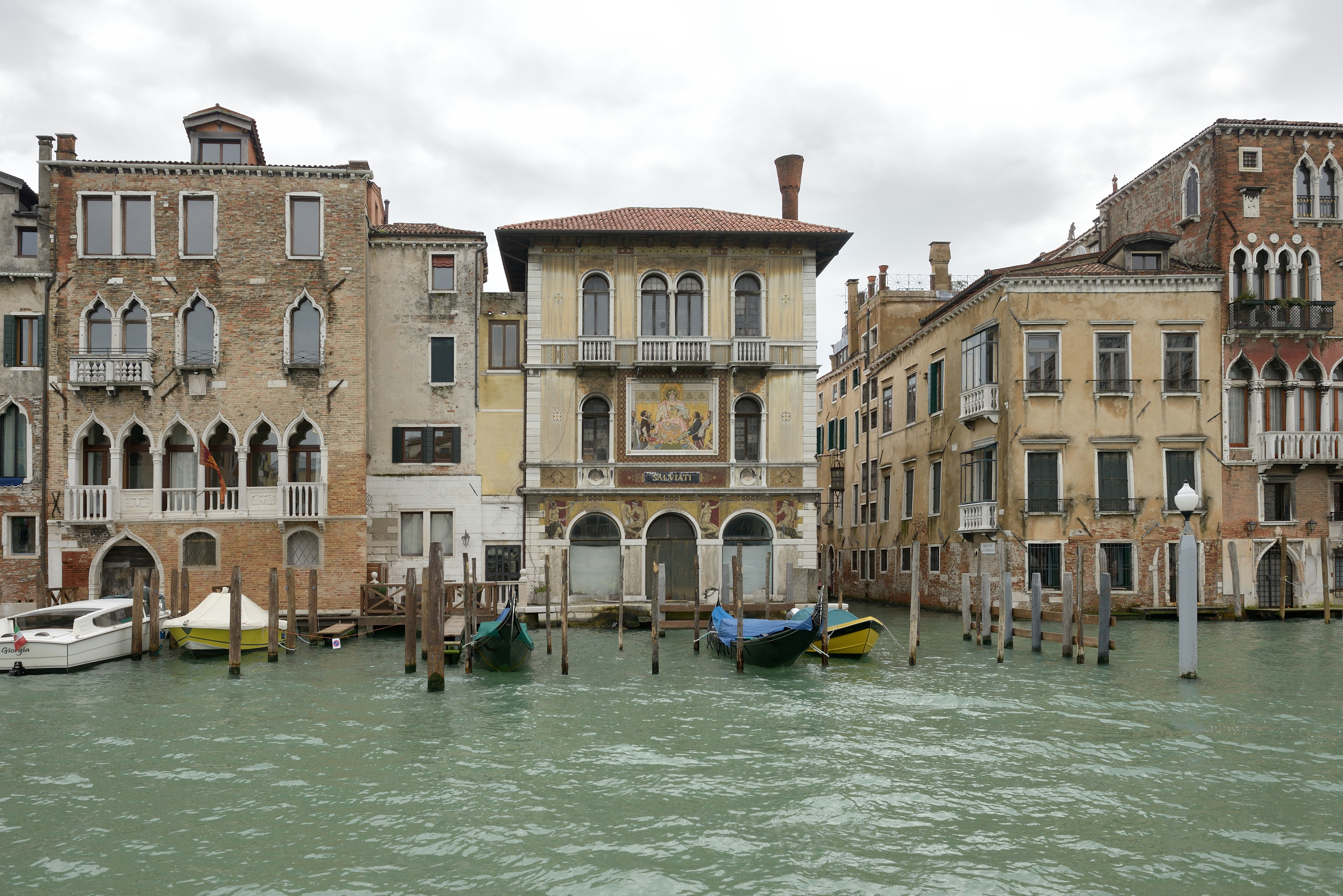
Palazzi Orio, Salviati, and Barbaro; facades on Grand Canal.

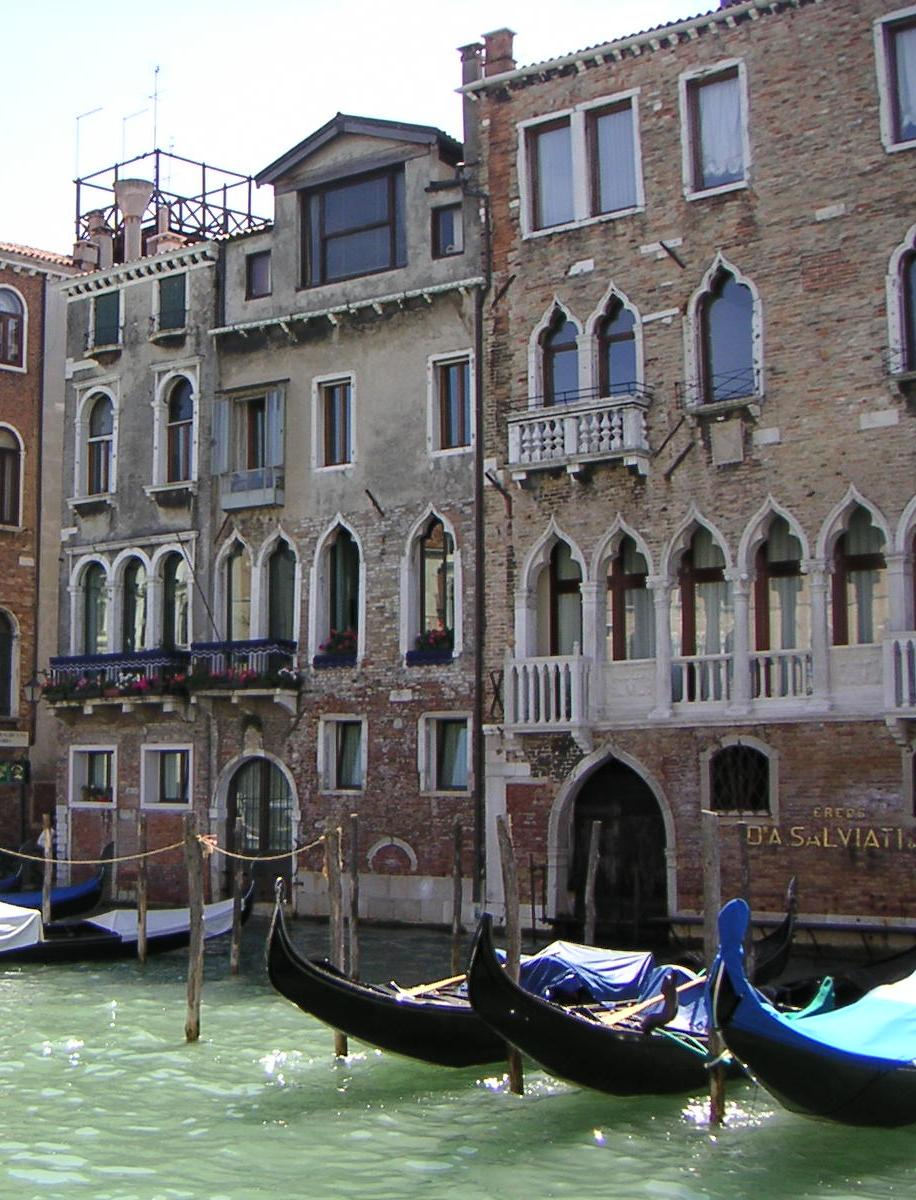
Details of the facade
