= Dorsoduro =

One of the six sestieri of Venice, historical neighbourhood

Coordinates: 45°25′51.60″N 12°19′33.60″E

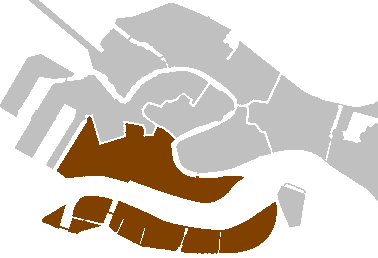
Location of Dorsoduro within Venice

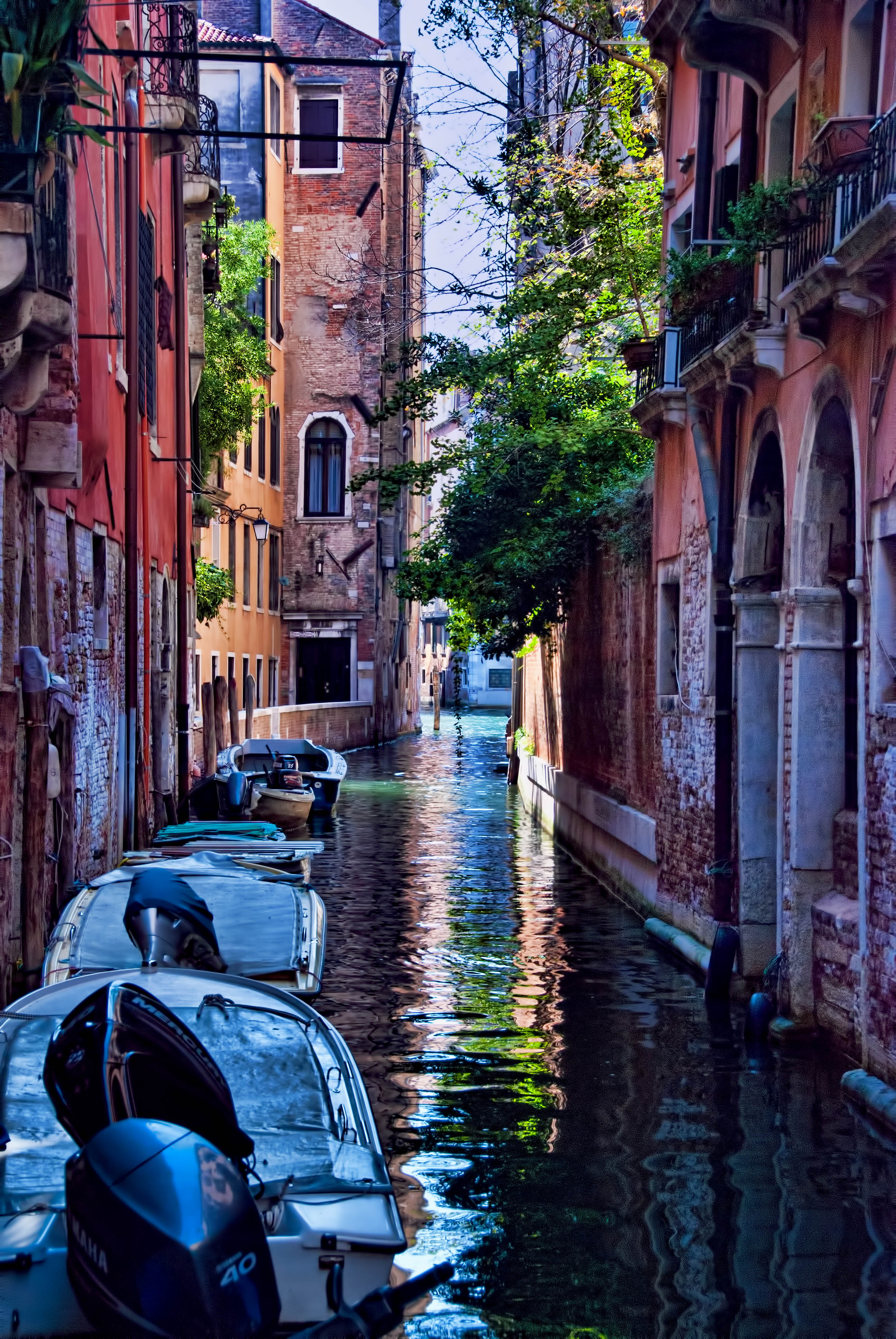
Shady canal in Dorsoduro, Venice

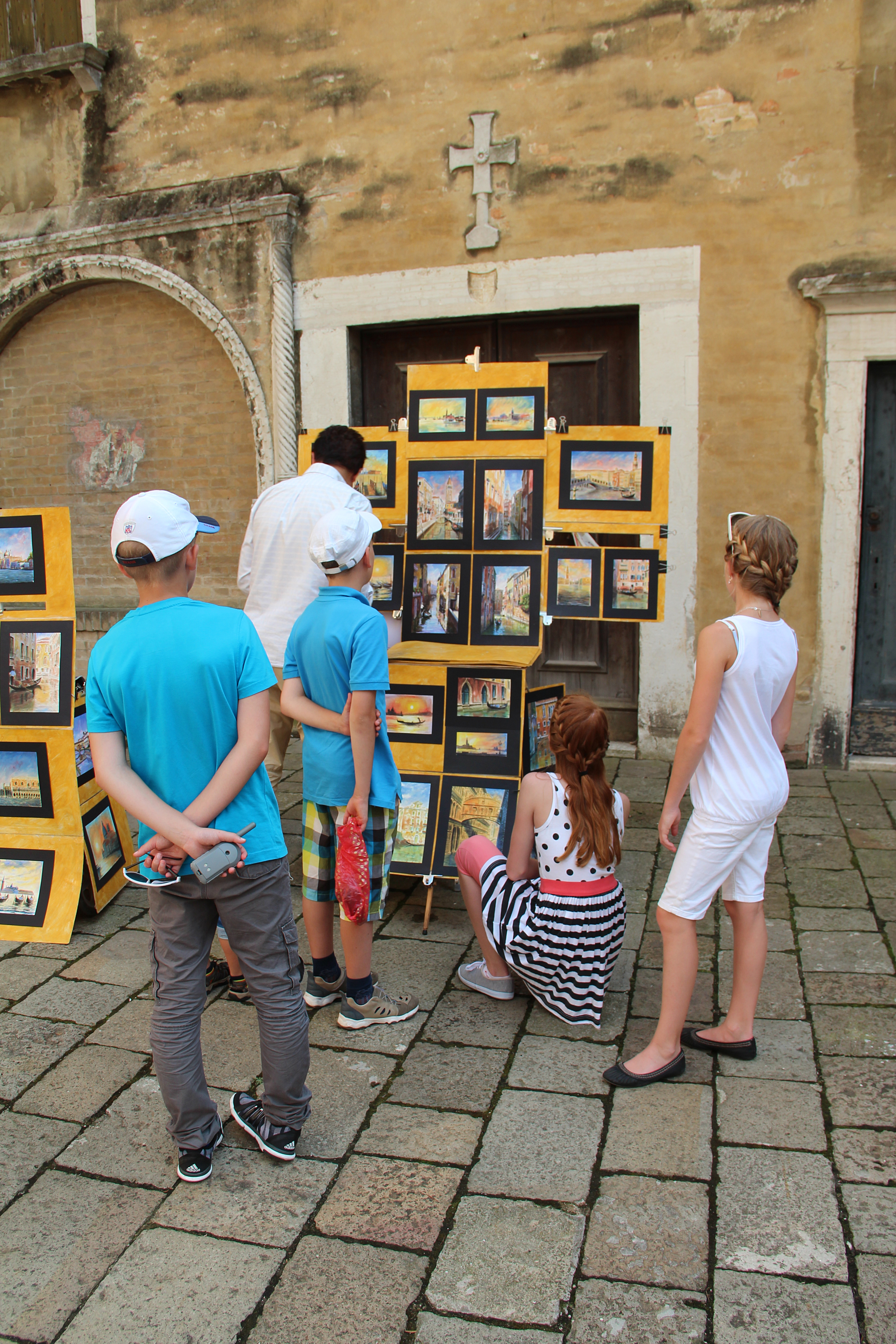
The Watercolorist in the Campo San Gregorio.

Dorsoduro is one of the six historic sestieri (districts) of Venice, Italy, located in the southern part of the city and known for its relatively firm terrain that earned it the name meaning "hard back" or "hard ridge" in Italian, distinguishing it from the more marshy areas of the lagoon. It stretches from the Grand Canal in the north to the Giudecca Canal in the south, encompassing waterfront promenades like the Zattere, the Punta della Dogana viewpoint, and occasionally including the nearby Giudecca island.

== History ==
The original heart of the area was the Giudecca Canal, along which buildings were constructed from the sixth century. By the eleventh century, settlement had spread across to the Grand Canal, while later religious buildings including the Basilica of Santa Maria della Salute and the Zattere quay are now its main landmarks.

In the nineteenth century the Accademia was set up in Dorsoduro and the Ponte dell'Accademia linked it to San Marco, making it an expensive area, popular with foreign residents. The western quarter end and the Giudecca, became industrialised around this time.

== Main sights ==
Landmarks and visitor attractions in Dorsoduro include:

- Ca' Foscari
- Ca' Rezzonico
- Campo San Barnaba
- Campo San Gregorio
- Campo Santa Margherita
- Gallerie dell'Accademia
- Peggy Guggenheim Collection
- Il Redentore (church)
- Le Zitelle
- Ospedale Giustinian
- Palazzo Ariani
- Palazzo Brandolin Rota
- Palazzo Dario
- Palazzo Giustinian Recanati
- Palazzo Mocenigo Gambara
- Palazzo Orio Semitecolo Benzon
- Palazzo Zenobio
- Punta della Dogana
  - Dogana da Mar
  - Santa Maria della Salute (church)
- San Pantalon (church)
- San Trovaso (church)
- Santa Maria del Carmelo (church)
- San Sebastiano (church)
- Scuola Grande dei Carmini
- Church of Ognissanti
