= Palazzo Mocenigo Gambara =

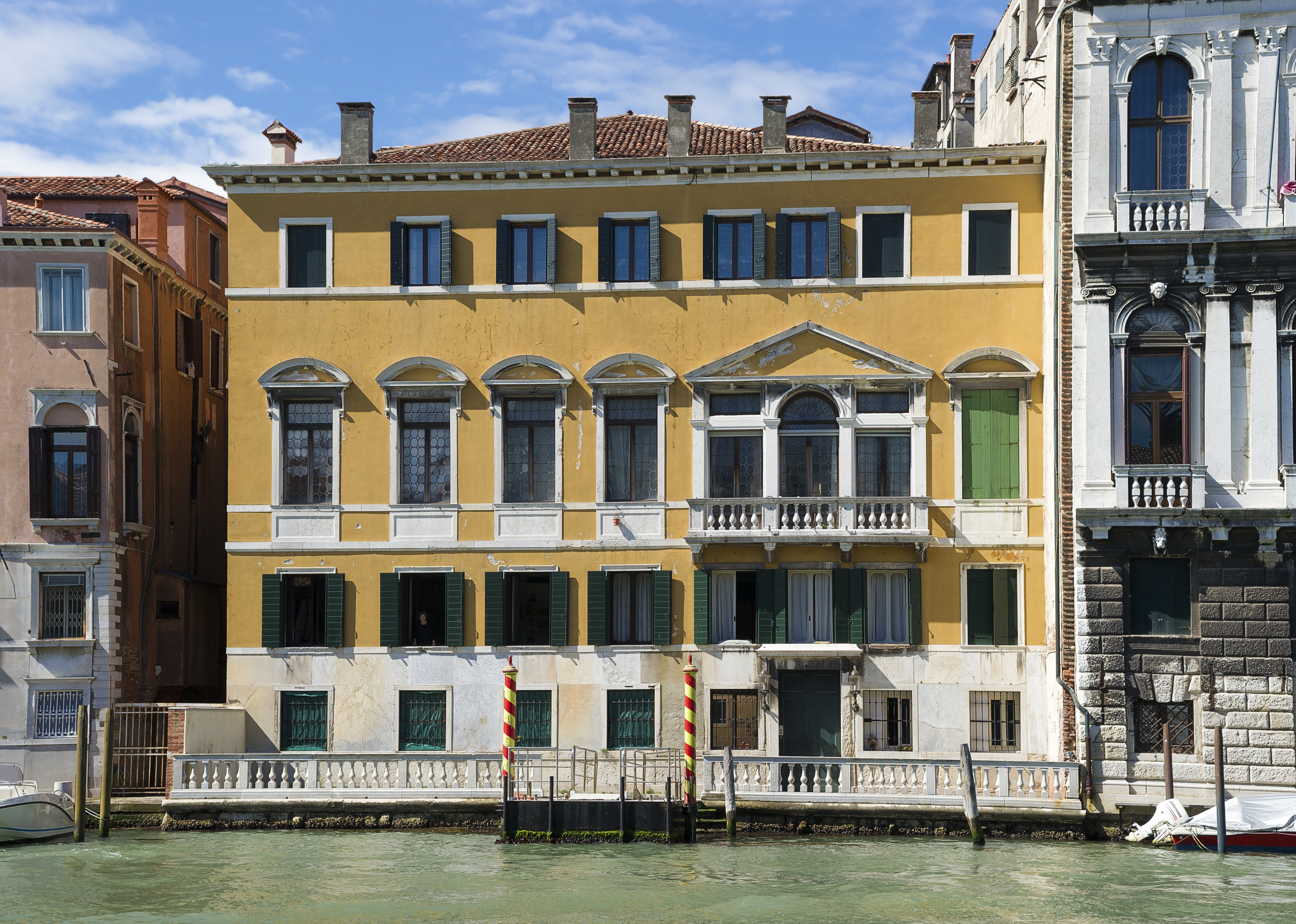
- Palazzo Mocenigo Gambara, facade on Grand Canal.
- Interactive map of the Palazzo Mocenigo Gambara area

General information
- Type: Residential
- Architectural style: Neoclassical
- Location: Dorsoduro district, Venice, Italy
- Coordinates: 45°25′54.45″N 12°19′40.41″E
- Construction stopped: 17th century

Technical details
- Floor count: 4 levels

Palazzo Mocenigo Gambara is a palace in Venice, located in the Dorsoduro district and overlooking the Grand Canal, between the Contarini Palazzi degli Scrigni and Corfù and Palazzo Querini alla Carità, not far from the Gallerie dell'Accademia and in front of Palazzo Giustinian Lolin.

== History ==
The palazzo was built during the second half of the 17th century to be the home of the prominent Mocenigo family. In this century, the family commissioned to paint frescoes on the internal courtyard walls, a work now lost. In the last years of the 18th century, the palace passed to the Gambara family due to the marriage between Francesco Mocenigo and Eleonora Gambara. Giambattista Canal and Jacopo Guarana painted the interiors. Today Palazzo Gambara, owned by the Venice Industrialists Association, is a congress venue.

== Architecture ==
The palazzo looks like a three-storey neoclassical building, with a mezzanine between the ground floor and the main floor. The facade is asymmetrical and almost completely devoid of architectural details, with the rectangular portal moved to the right half. The main opening of the main floor corresponds with the portal: a serliana surmounted by a triangular tympanum and accented by a projecting balcony. On the sides of the serliana, there are rectangular windows surmounted by arched pediments. These windows are also arranged asymmetrically, four to the left of the main opening and only one to its right.

Inside, in the large hall on the main floor, there are the allegorical frescoes by Giambattista Canal, created around 1769 are still preserved.

== Gallery ==
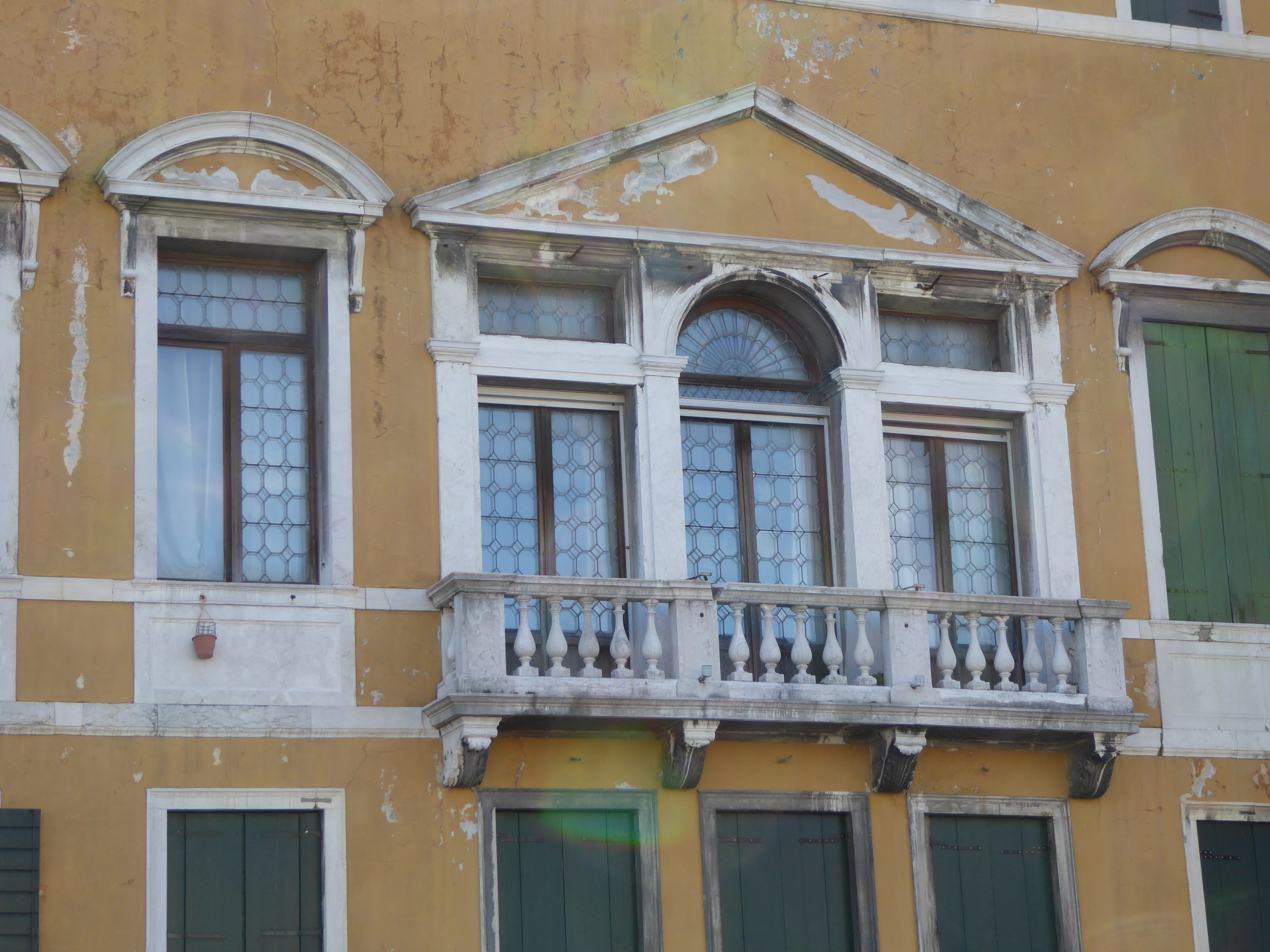
The triangular tympanum

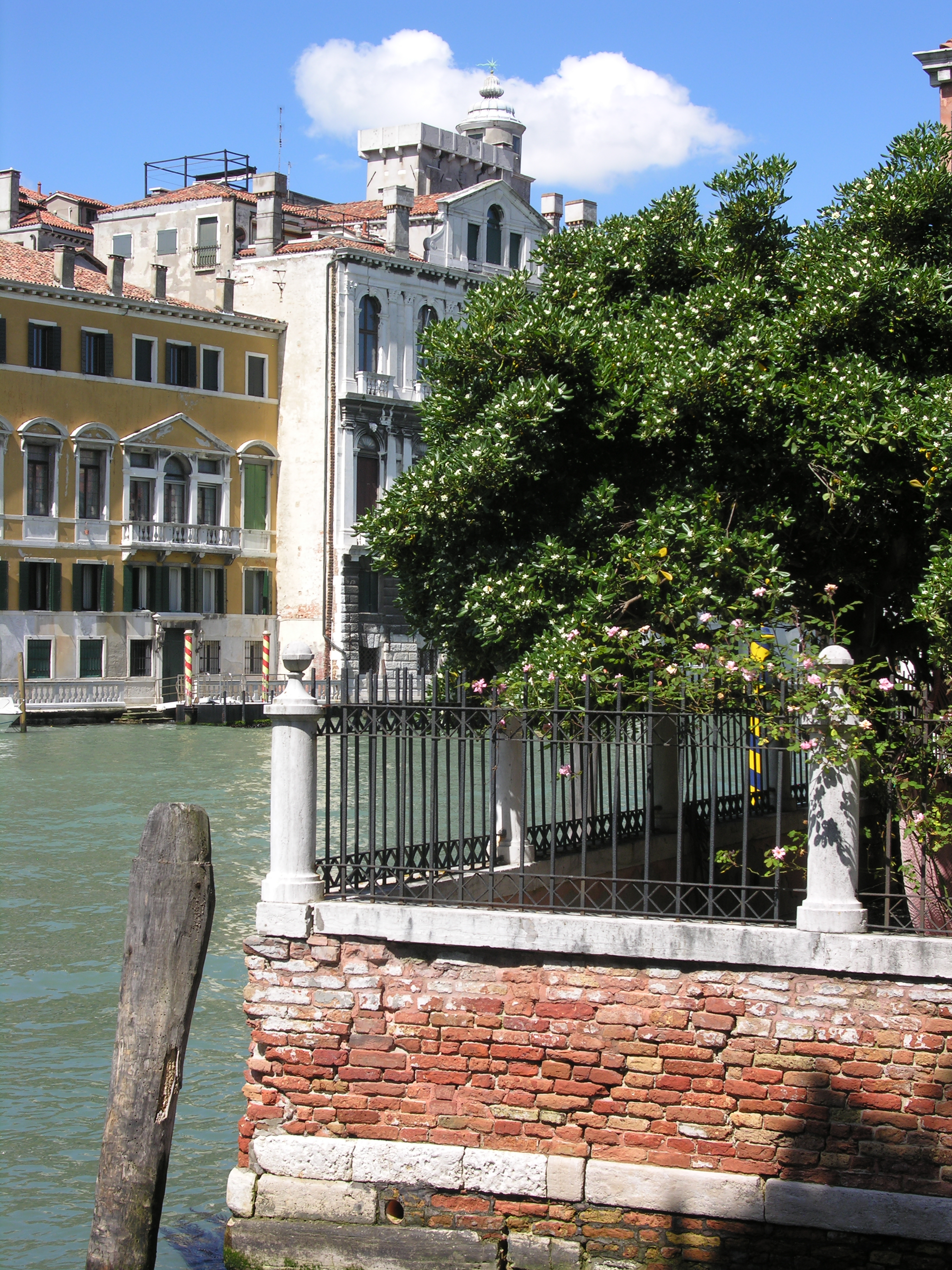
A view from across Grand Canal

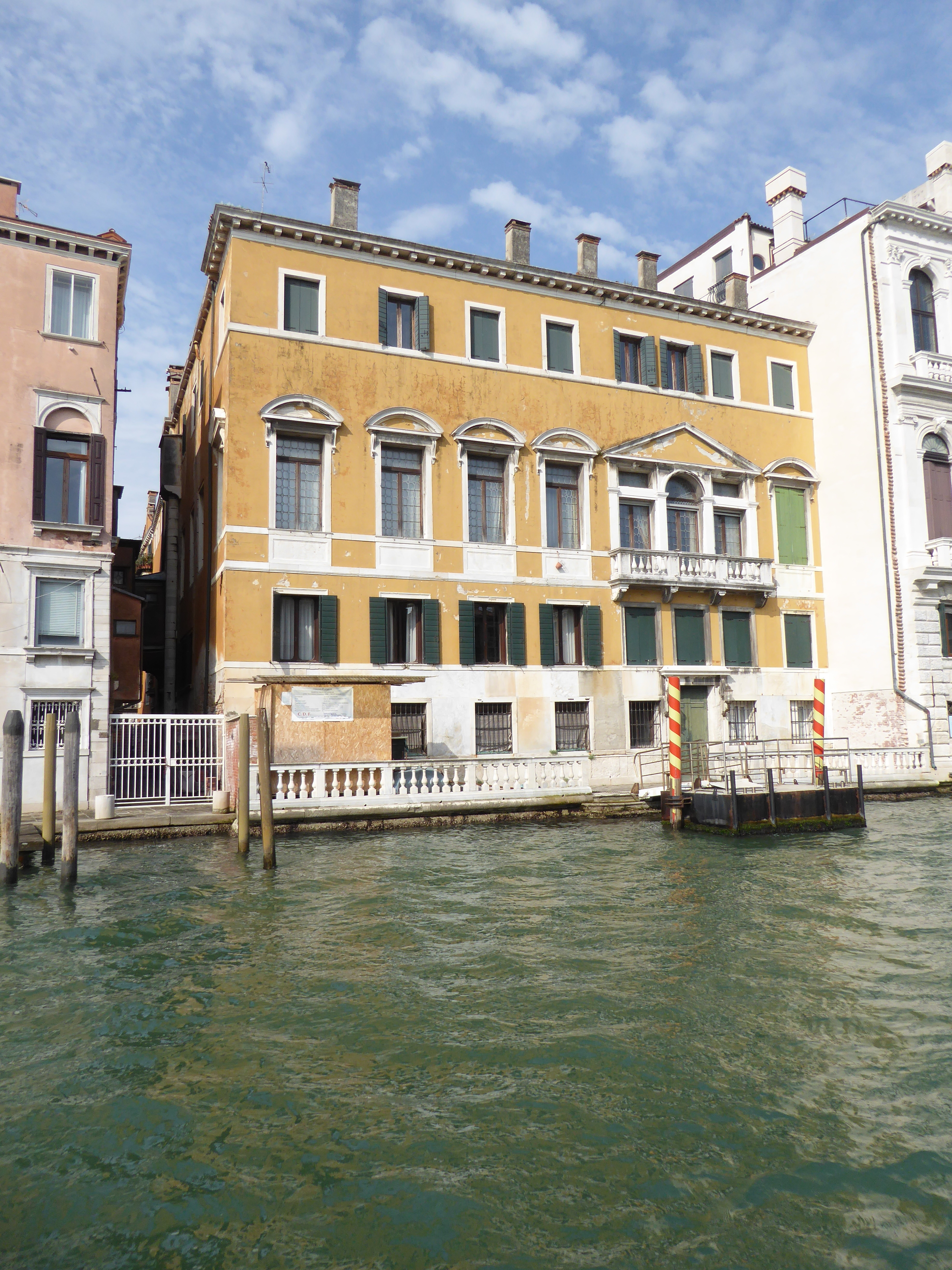
A facade on Grand Canal
