= Campo San Barnaba =

Campo (square) in Venice, Italy

Coordinates: 45.4331°N 12.3254°E

- Campo (Square)
- Location: Venice, Italy
- Interactive map of Campo San Barnaba

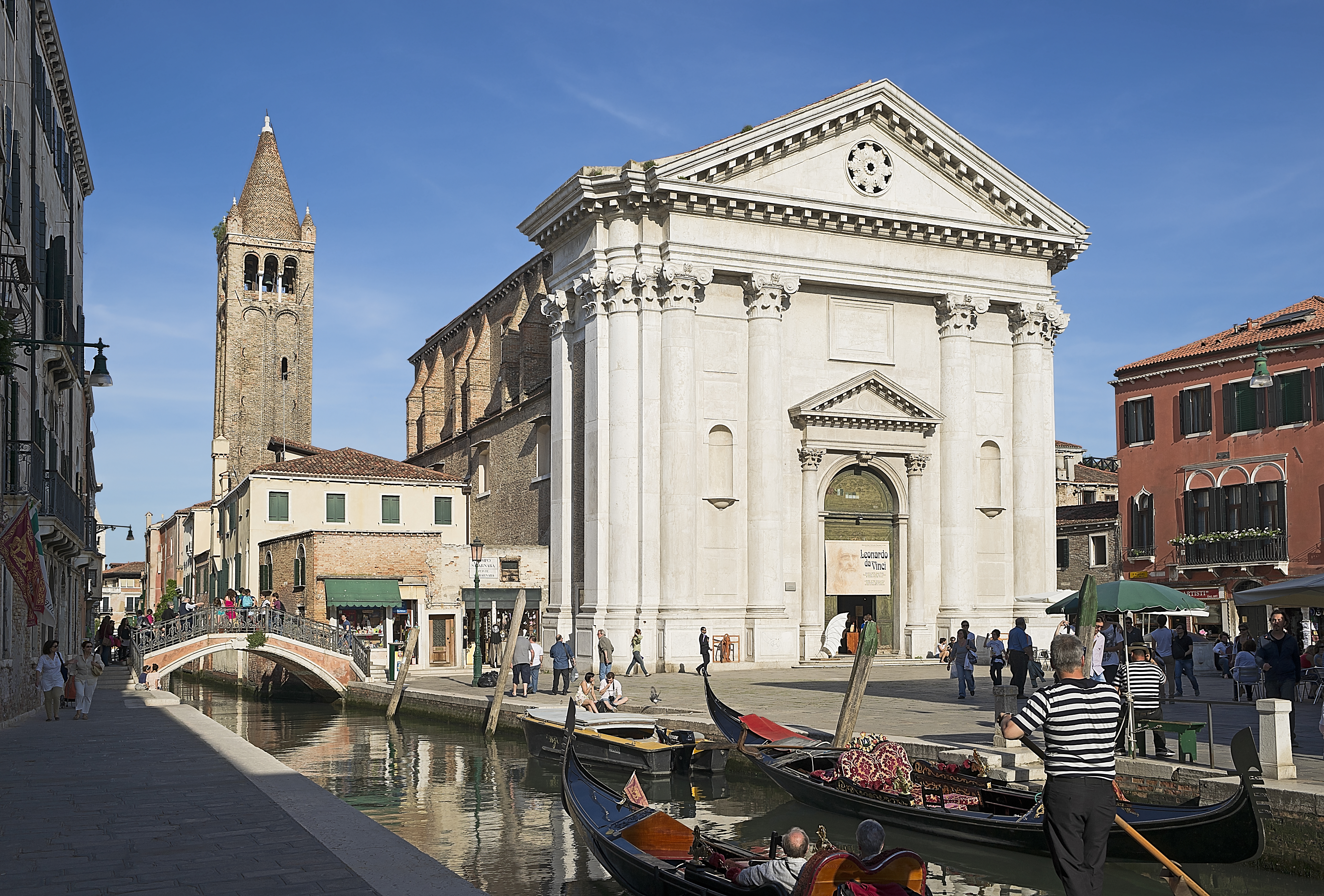
The church of San Barnaba

Campo San Barnaba is a campo (square) located in the Dorsoduro sestiere of Venice, Italy. The neighborhood's church is the San Barnaba.

The square has been featured in numerous movies, including David Lean's 1955 film Summertime, where Katharine Hepburn falls into a canal as she steps backwards while photographing, and the 1989 film Indiana Jones and the Last Crusade, which featured scenes shot in the Campo San Barnaba, using the facade of the church to depict a fictional library.

== See also ==
- Dorsoduro−related topics
