= Il Redentore =

Chiesa del Santissimo Redentore Church of the Most Holy Redeemer
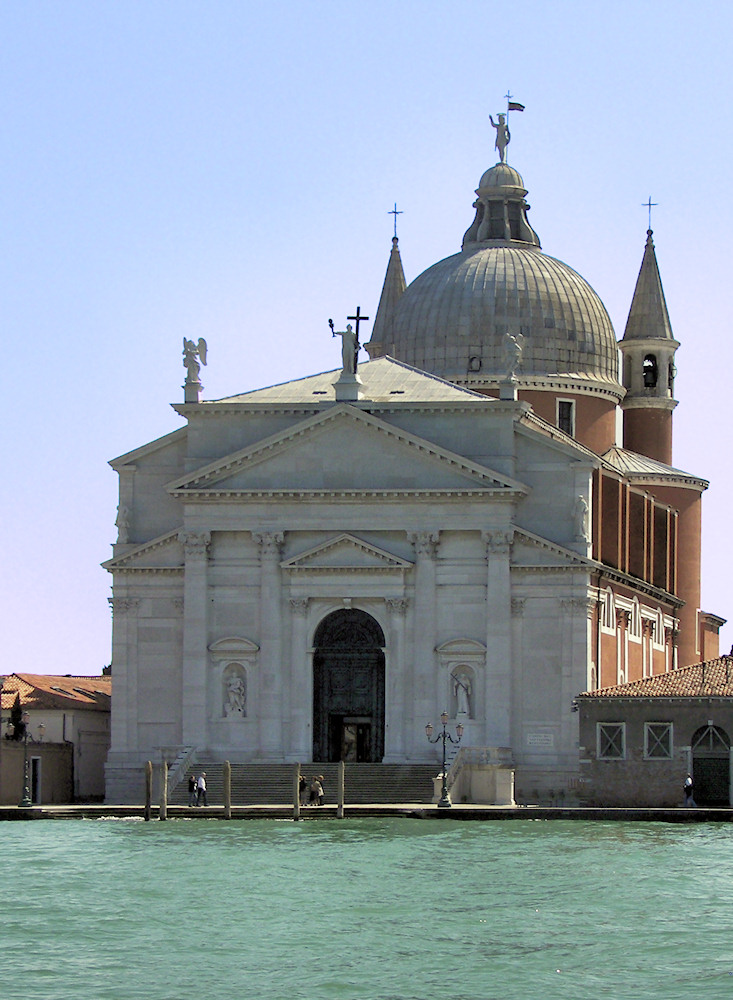
- Il Redentore on the island Giudecca
- Click on the map for a fullscreen view
- 45°25′29.97″N 12°19′56.83″E
- Location: Venice
- Country: Italy
- Denomination: Roman Catholic

History
- Status: Active
- Consecrated: 1592

Architecture
- Architect: Andrea Palladio
- Architectural type: Church
- Style: Renaissance
- Groundbreaking: 1577
- Completed: 1592

Specifications
- Length: 75 metres (246 ft)
- Width: 30 metres (98 ft)

The Chiesa del Santissimo Redentore (English: Church of the Most Holy Redeemer), commonly known as Il Redentore, is a 16th-century Roman Catholic church located on Giudecca (island) in the sestiere of Dorsoduro, in the city of Venice, Italy.

It was designed by Italian Renaissance architect Andrea Palladio and built as a votive church to thank God for the deliverance of the city from a major outbreak of the plague. Located on the waterfront of the Canale della Giudecca, it dominates the skyline of the island of Giudecca. It is a member of the Chorus Association of Venetian churches and contains a number of paintings by artists including Tintoretto, Paolo Veronese, and Francesco Bassano.

== History ==
Il Redentore was built as a votive church in thanksgiving for deliverance from a major outbreak of the plague that decimated Venice between 1575 and 1576, in which some 46,000 people (25–30% of the population) died. The Senate of the Republic of Venice commissioned the architect Andrea Palladio to design the votive church. Though the Senate wished the Church to be square plan, Palladio designed a single nave church with three chapels on either side. Its prominent position on the Canale della Giudecca gave Palladio the opportunity to design a facade inspired by the Pantheon of Rome and enhanced by being placed on a wide plinth. 15 steps were required to reach the church's entrance, a direct reference to the Temple of Jerusalem and complicit with Palladio's own requirement that "the ascent (of the faithful) will be gradual, so that the climbing will bring more devotion".

The cornerstone was laid by the Patriarch of Venice Giovanni Trevisan on 3 May 1577 and the building was consecrated in 1592. At the urgent solicitations of Pope Gregory XIII, after consecration the church was placed in charge of the Order of Friars Minor Capuchin. A small number of Friars reside in the monastery attached to the church.

Every year the doge and senators walked across a specially constructed pontoon bridge from the Zattere to Giudecca to attend Mass in the church. The Festa del Redentore remains a major festival in the Venetian calendar, celebrated on the third Sunday in July. A huge firework display on the previous evening is followed by a mass procession across the pontoon bridge.

The church was the scene of vandalism on 15–16 May 2022 after a group of three people – who were later arrested after being identified on CCTV footage – painted a three meter wide portion of the front facade of the church with pink paint as well as an equation of some sorts on top of the pink. A local tried removing the paint using water, but was unsuccessful in their efforts and only allowed the paint to permeate the stone it was displayed on. The restoration is now being handled by government art officials.

== Exterior ==
Il Redentore has one of the most prominent sites of any of Palladio's structures, and is considered one of the pinnacles of his career. It is a large, white building with a dome crowned by a statue of the Redeemer. On the façade a central triangular pediment overlies a larger, lower one. This classical feature recalls Palladio's façade for San Francesco della Vigna, where he used an adaptation of a triumphal arch. Palladio is known for applying rigorous geometric proportions to his façades and that of this church is no exception. The overall height is four-fifths that of its overall width whilst the width of the central portion is five-sixths of its height.

It has been suggested that there are some oriental influences in the exterior, particularly the two campanili which resemble minarets.

== Interior ==
As a pilgrimage church, the building was expected to have a long nave, which was something of a challenge for Palladio with his commitment to classical architecture. The result is a somewhat eclectic building, the white stucco and gray stone interior combines the nave with a domed crossing in spaces that are clearly articulated yet unified. An uninterrupted Corinthian order makes its way around the entire interior.

=== Art work ===
Il Redentore contains paintings by Francesco Bassano, Lazzaro Bastiani, Carlo Saraceni, Leandro Bassano, Palma the Younger, Jacopo Bassano, Francesco Bissolo, Rocco Marconi, Paolo Veronese, Alvise Vivarini and the workshop of Tintoretto. The sacristy also contains a series of wax heads of Franciscans made in 1710.

The church was painted by Canaletto a number of times, notably in a painting currently held at Woburn Abbey, England.

== Gallery ==
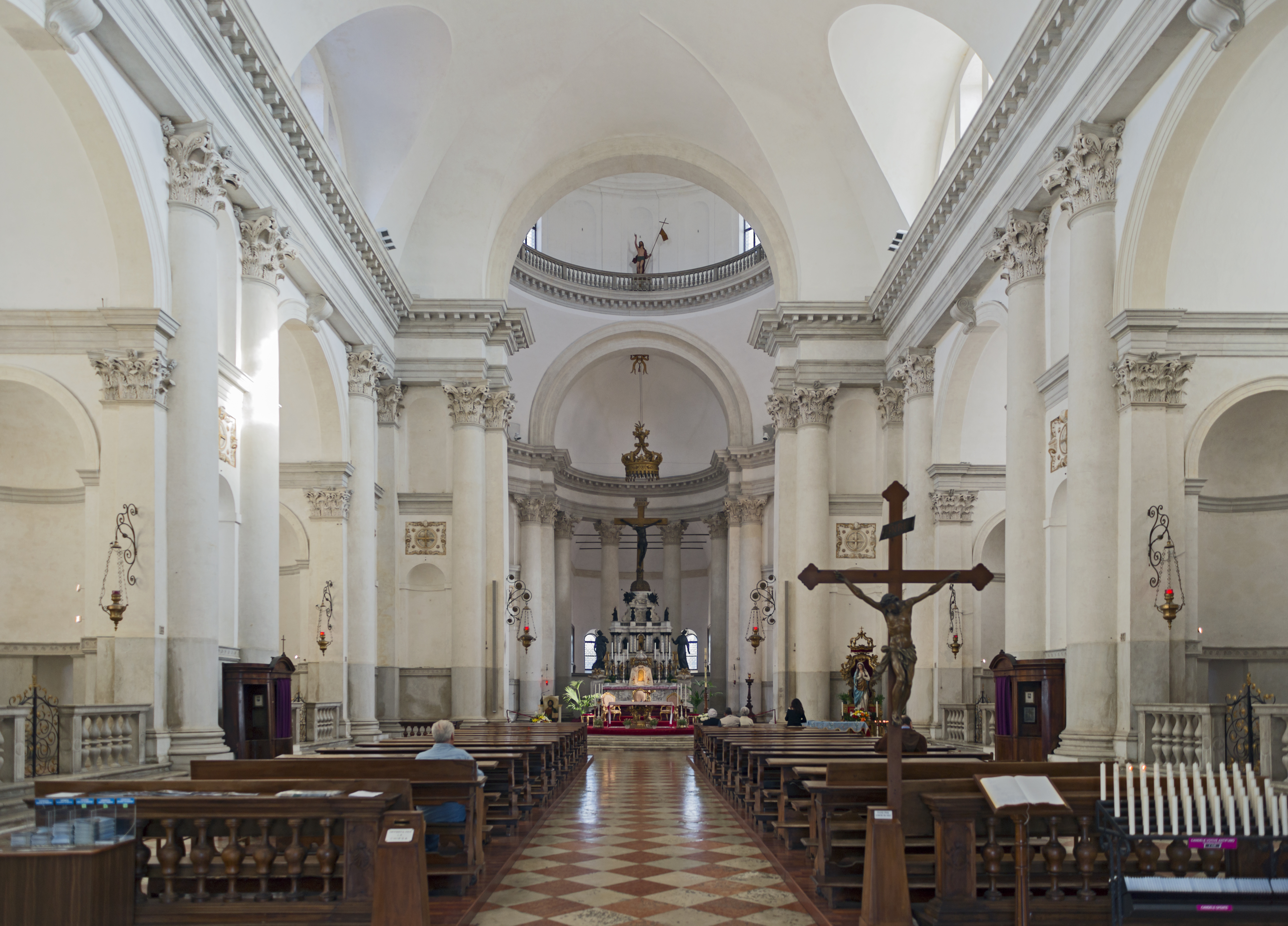
Interior view

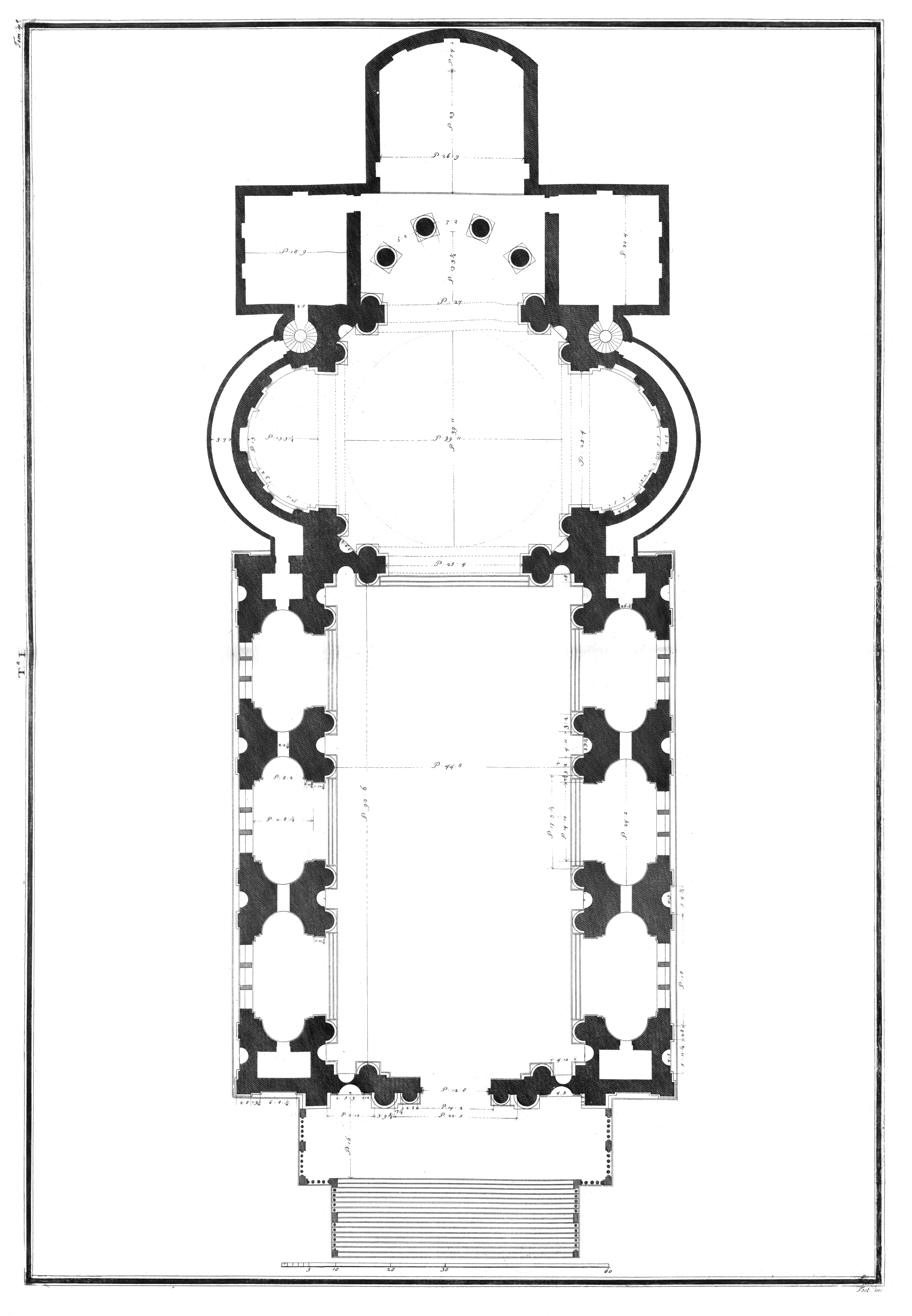
Plan of the church (1783)

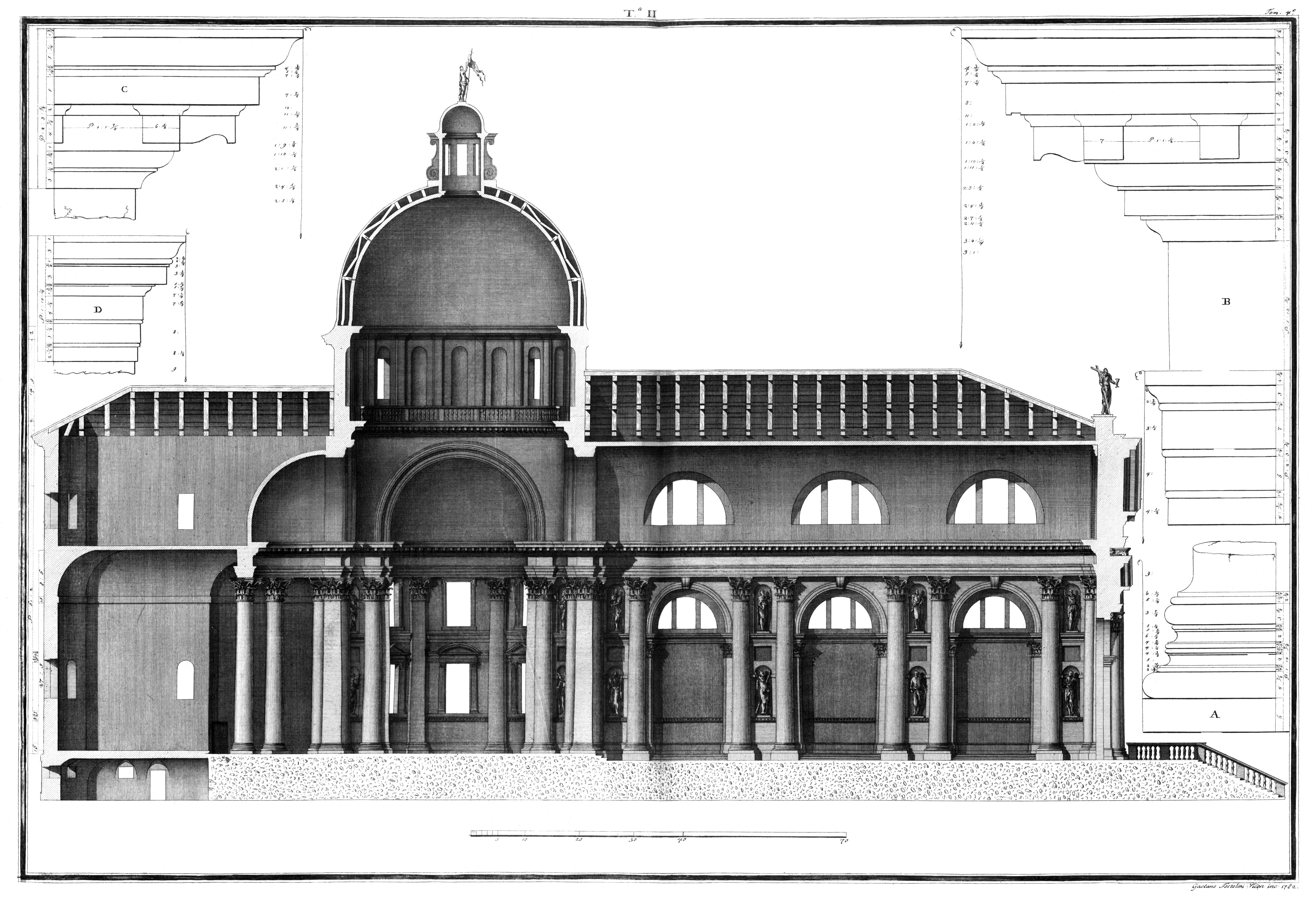
Longitudinal section (1783)

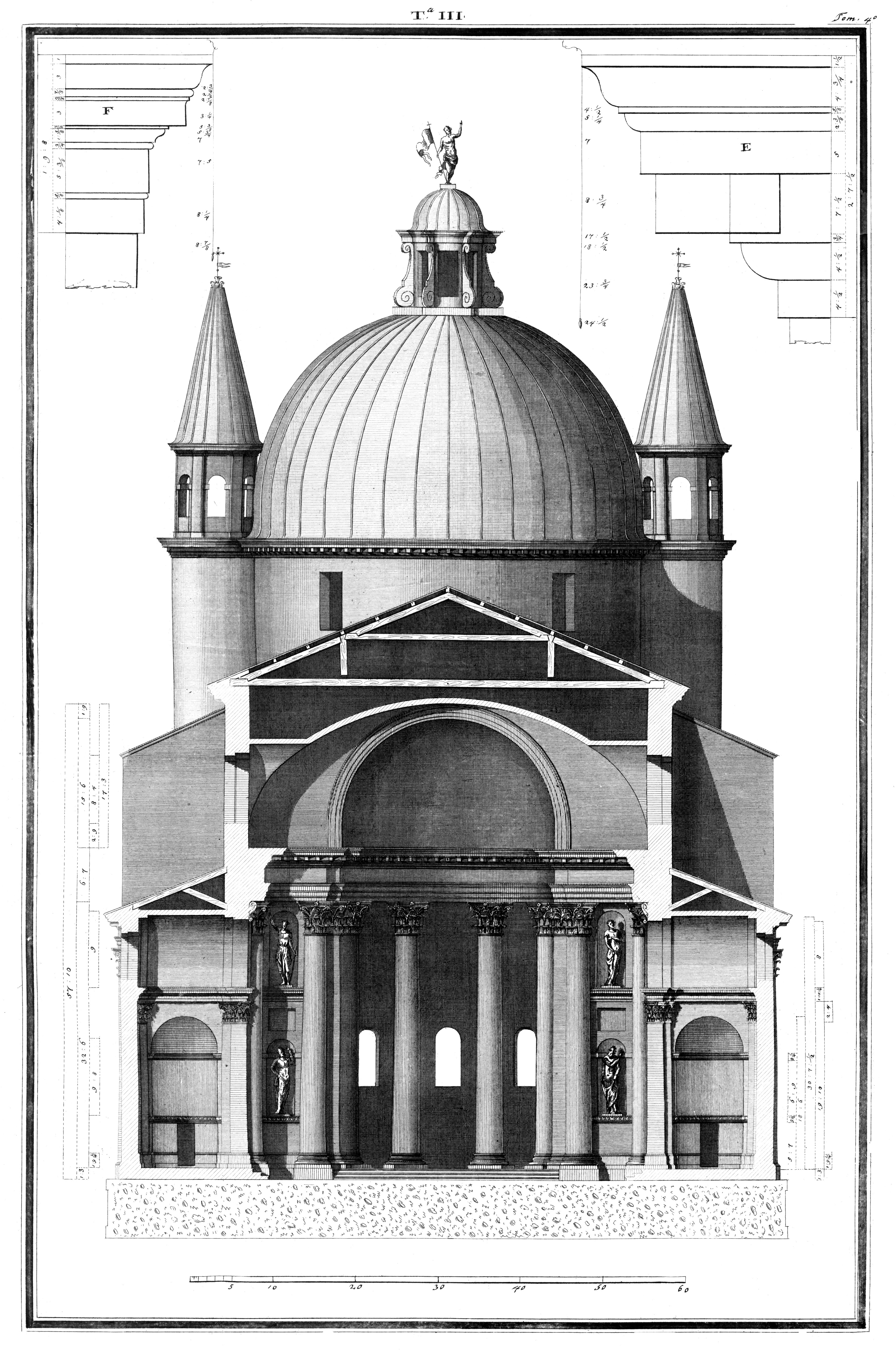
Transversal section (1783)

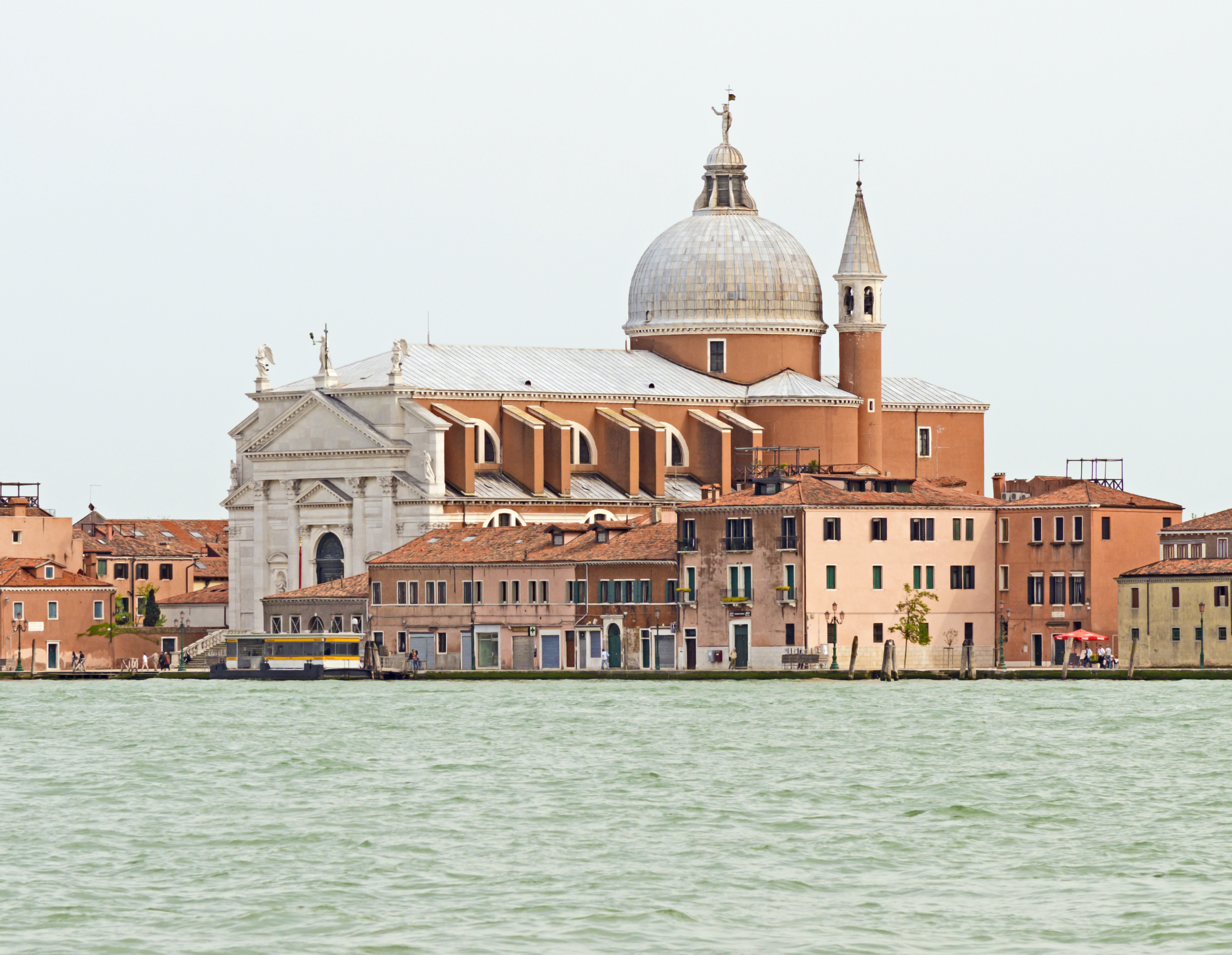
Il Redentore and Canale della Giudecca

== See also ==
- 16th-century Western domes
- List of buildings and structures in Venice
- List of churches in Venice

== Notes ==
Preceded by Punta della Dogana	Venice landmarks Il Redentore	Succeeded by Rialto Bridge
