= Palazzo Salviati (Dorsoduro) =

Historic building in Venice, northern Italy

Coordinates: 45°25′51″N 12°19′57″E

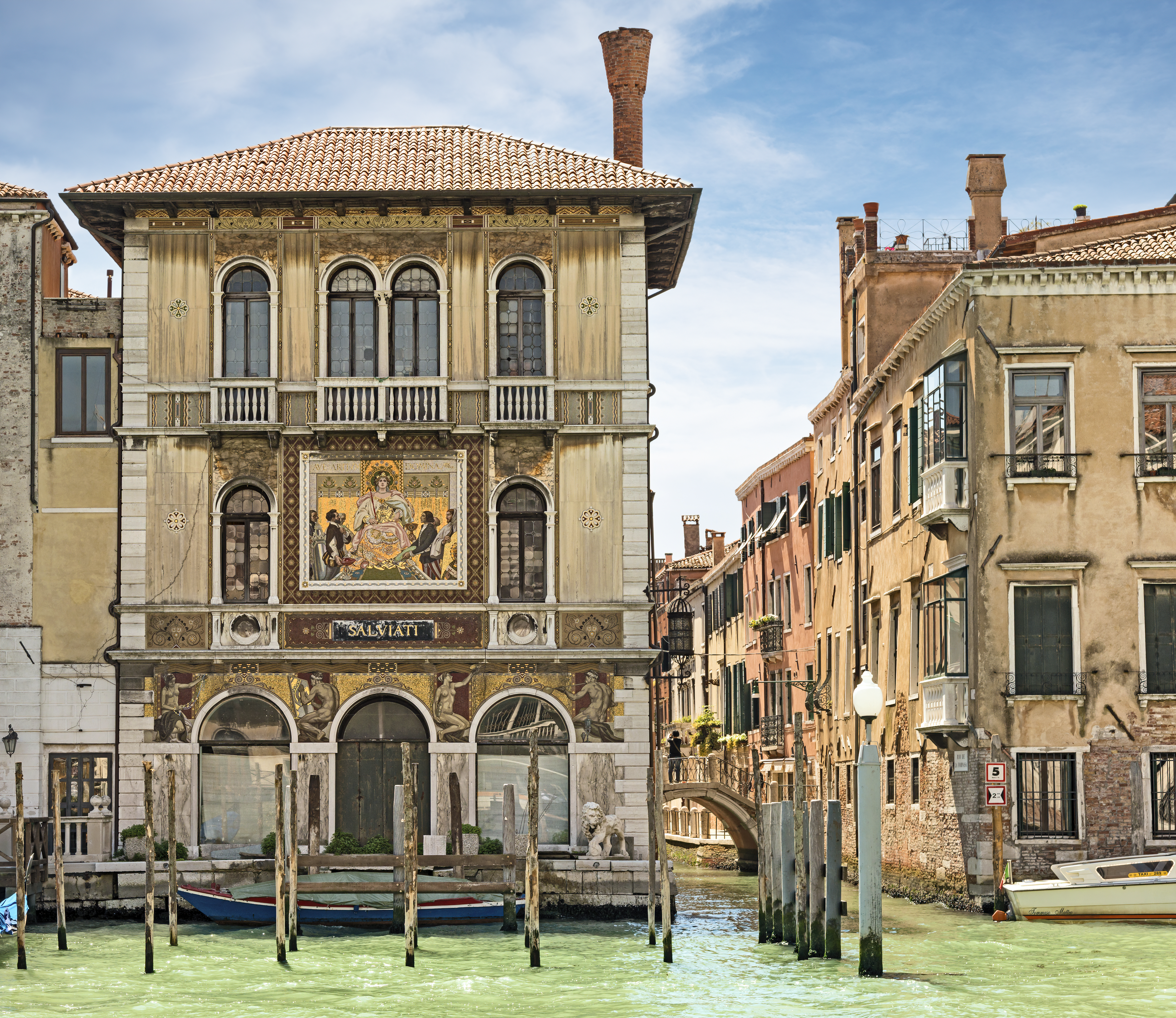
Palazzo Salviati façade overlooking the Grand Canal.

Palazzo Salviati is a palace on the Grand Canal in the Dorsoduro district (or sestieri) in Venice, northern Italy. It is situated between the Palazzo Barbaro Wolkoff and Palazzo Orio Semitecolo Benzon.

== History ==
The building was built as a shop and the furnace of the Salviati family between 1903 and 1906, designed by the architect Giacomo Dell'Olivo. The Salviati company was founded in 1859 by Antonio Salviati. In 1924 the building underwent a major renovation, which involved the addition of an extra floor and the placement of a large mosaic façade.

== Description ==
Structurally the façade is relatively simple, with arched doors on the first and third floors and matching arched windows on the second floor. Attention is drawn to the mosaic figures that cover most of the façade, with a very large mosaic in the center of the building and smaller mosaics over the doors on the first floor and at the top of the third.
