= Le Zitelle =

Church in Venice, Italy

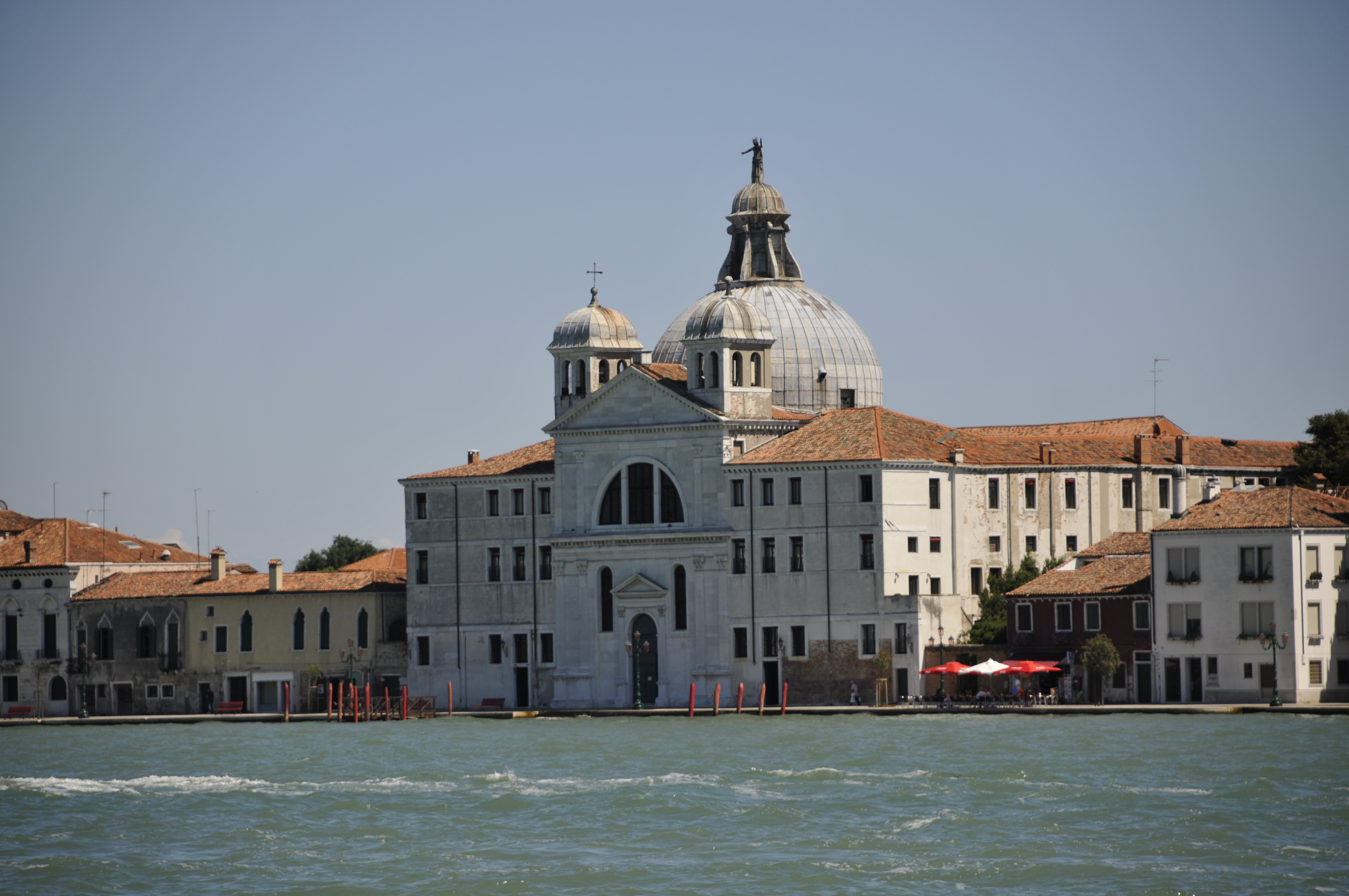
- Le Zitelle from near Piazza San Marco

- Location within Venice Location within Italy

Religion
- Affiliation: Roman Catholic
- Province: Venice

Location
- Location: Venice, Italy
- Coordinates: 45.4267°N 12.3391°E

Architecture
- Completed: 1588

Le Zitelle (officially Santa Maria della Presentazione), or “The Spinsters” is a church in Venice, Italy. It is part of a former complex which gave shelter to young maidens ("zitelle" in Italian) who had no dowry, and is on the eastern part of the Giudecca island. To the east of Le Zitelle lies Il Redentore, which was constructed around the same time.

Generally attributed to Andrea Palladio, the original design dates to 1580 and the construction to 1581. Its housing edifice surrounds the church in a horseshoe shape, with a court behind the apse. The façade has two orders, surmounted by a tympanum and flanked by two small bell towers. The church has a large dome with a roof lantern.

The interior is an axial plan. It houses works by Francesco Bassano, Antonio Vassilacchi, and Palma il Giovane.

Today, Le Zitelle is part of what is considered the five hidden jewels of Venice. The Church is now only open on Sundays, and the Bauer Hotel has acquired the former convent and converted it into a 50-room luxury hotel, The Palladio.

== History ==
Initial Acquisition, 1561:

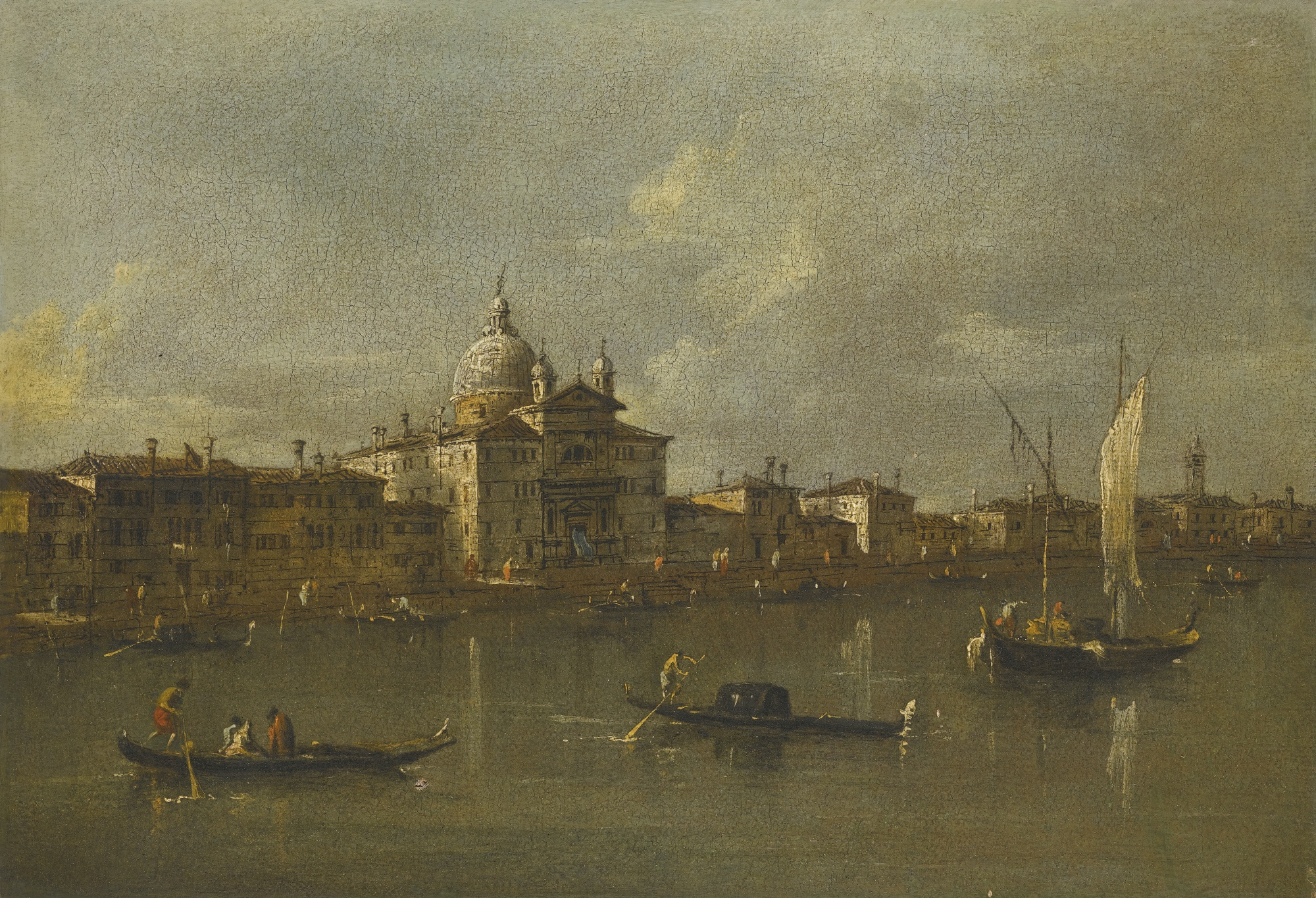
Venice: The Giudecca with the Zitelle by Francesco Guardi (1780s)

Before the Church of Santa Maria della Presentazione delle Zitelle, the women founders of the Casa delle Zitelle rented a building in contra San Marcilian in Cannaregio. This initial location was near the major prostitution areas of San Marcuola and San Leonardo, which enabled the Zitelle to act as an alternative for young women. Founders Adrianna Contarini, Paola Dona, Isabetta Grimani, and Lucrezia Priuli held the building for a few months before recognizing they needed an upgrade due to the increase of girls living at the house in July 1560. Contarini located the future home of the new Casa delle Zitelle in early September, of the same year. Fundraising began shortly after to raise the 8,500 ducats required to purchase the property. The site was most intriguing for the women founders due to its visibility from the shore of the Bacino and to its untouchable nature, removed from the rest of the city. The property was officially purchased in April 1561, and the women moved into the medieval house shortly after. They inherited a space for at least 40 people and gardens for fresh air and growing vegetables.

The First Building Campaign, 1575-77: From Casa da Statio to Monasterio

Only a little was changed about the medieval house after its purchase in 1561, as efforts focused on repaying the debt acquired in purchasing the property. But in 1575 Marina Bernardo and other governatrici oversaw the beginnings of the renovations. From the records stored in the archive of the Church, it can be seen that nearly 360,000 bricks were purchased, and nearly as much lumber. The only major additions that were documented were the building of a few fireplaces, a new kitchen, laundry, and swapping the floors and ceilings for lumber. It is theorized that, while there were outlines for new foundation walls, this was only to add additional shoring to the existing walls. Further, the building footprint was kept the same from before this construction so it is guessed that interior walls were removed and the remaining load-bearing walls were expanded to withstand the additional load. The reworking of space in the building transformed it into the form of a convent; L-shaped domestic portions with a set of meditating rooms, entryway, and offices were grouped at the front of the building for ease of access. Work, study, and eating rooms were located on the ground floor, with the respective dormitories on the floors above. Finally, a kitchen was added to the back of the building.

The Second Building Campaign, 1581-88: The Church of Santa Maria della Presentazione delle Zitelle

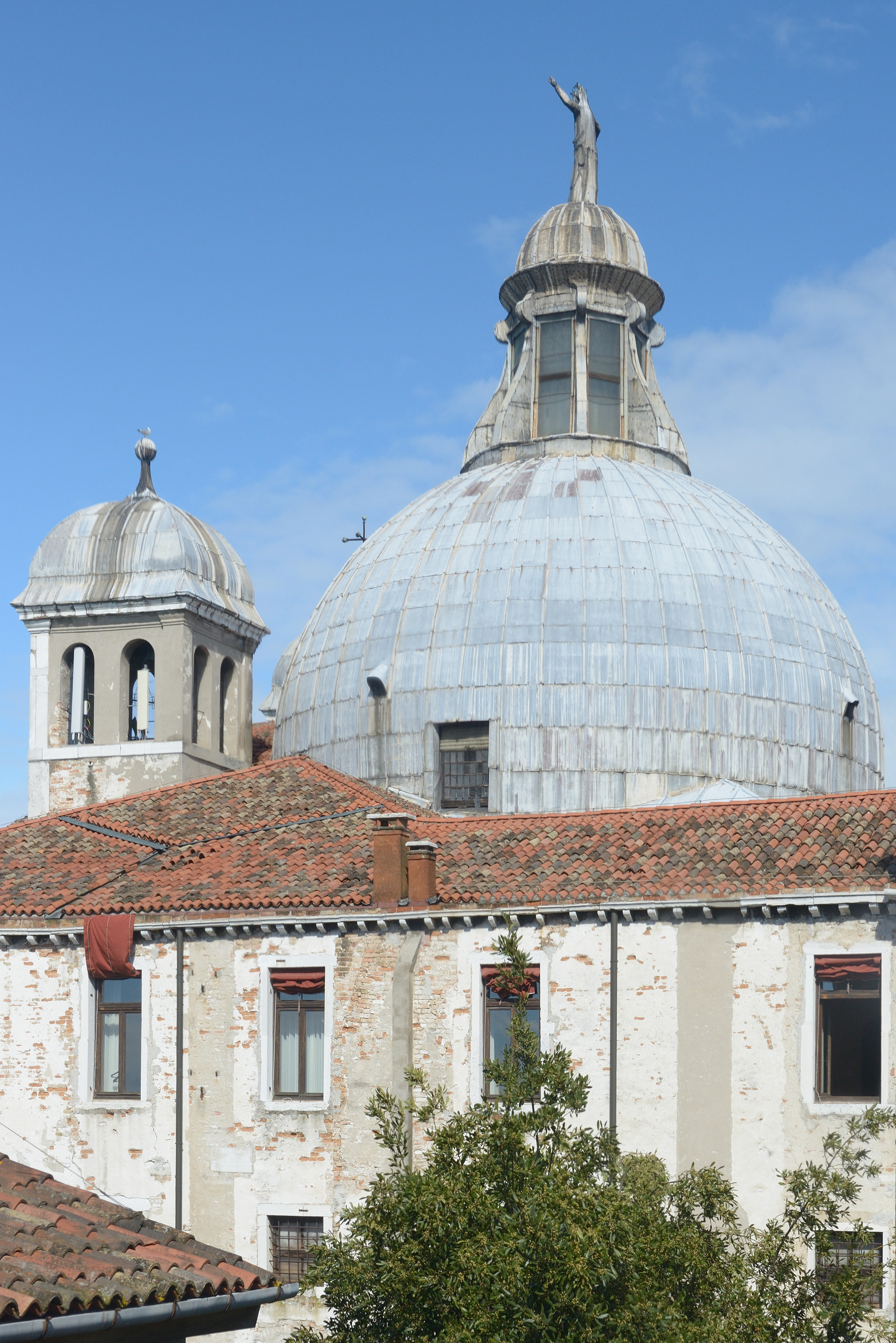
Dome of Le Zitelle

Given that the institution was founded to house virgins, the Church was consequentially dedicated to the Presentation of the Virgin, thus, the Virgin Mary. Construction was marked first in June of 1582 when the Congregation petitioned the Senate for assistance to proceed with their project. The Senate granted the Zitelle the use of the inner and outer scaffolding of Il Redentore once they were no longer necessary. According to tax documents, by 1585, the exterior of the new church had been completed and interior work had commenced. The high altar was completed in 1586 due to the patronage of Bartolomeo Marchesi, the left and right altars were not completed until the early 17th century due to funding issues. When both dome and lantern were completed in 1588 attention quickly turned towards further expansion of the Church and residential spaces.

While the Church's design is generally attributed to Palladio, there is no known evidence solidifying the architect's relation to the project. This attribution generally comes from Giovanni Stringa's 1604 edition of the famous guidebook, Venetia, citta nobilissima, wherein he raves about the new church. He attests that it was built by Giacomo Bozzetto, a builder employed for the construction of the Palazzo Ducale, following a design by Andrea Palladio. However, architectural historians have drawn into question Palladio's implication as this design would have occurred very close to his passing. In addition, the Zitelle's issues with funding present another barrier to being able to afford the design fee for the Church. While many of the governors had ties to Palladio, it is much more likely that the Church was designed to bring civic piety to the Giudecca having been constructed after Il Redentore by an unknown architect.

The Third Building Campaign, 1589-91: New East Wing and Development of the H-plan

In response to the apparent change in direction the Congregation had taken in building the Church in Palladian style, they adjusted to adopt an axial plan as seen in the Incurabili, across the canal. Two choirs were added on the second floor of each wing, behind the respective altars on either side of the church. Grated thermal windows were inserted above the side altars to enable the girls to hear the service while not being visible. During this time of expansion, the refectory was built, the entrance hall was formalized, and stairs were built on each side of the cross-wing. Dating of the grout in the east wing during the 1980s restoration helped to confirm that the building and further development of this wing happened at this time.

The Fourth Building Campaign, 1596-97: West Wing is Completed

After all the development of the Casa delle Zitelle in the recent decades there only remained two goals that had not been accomplished: quarters for the Governatrici and Madonna. The new quarters were placed at the rear of the new west wing and took up the ground, mezzanine, and first floors. This construction was also utilized to add two more dormitories and a wall enclosing the property. Much of the building, as it is still visible today, was completed at this time. It was a representation of the experiences of the women founders' lives in Renaissance Venice, with all the necessities to prepare the next generations of Venetian women.

== Interior ==
Both exterior and interior spaces only see the use of Corinthian pilasters and columns as this alluded to the Virgin and the virgins who worshipped within, as the Corinthian order was often seen as the order of virgins. The main portion of the church is square, although the corners are chamfered to support the dome. Corinthian pilasters line the walls with a series of paintings from the school of Palma Giovane between each of them. These paintings were gifted to the Zitelle in 1675 by Moceniga Mocenigo.

The high altar is set in its own barrel-vaulted rectilinear space with lateral windows to provide natural lighting from the courtyard behind. The Presentation of Mary at the Temple by Francesco Bassano adorns the backsplash of this altar, encrusted in marble and gold tabernacle. Marble Corinthian columns frame the painting like drapes, as was common in Renaissance Architecture.

Both side altars are set within classicizing marble column frames with respective miniature temple fronts.

The entryway of the church is under a much higher barrel vault with hemisphere thermal windows above and arched windows flanking the smaller double doors. The Birth of Mary by Pietro Ricchi gracefully rests upon the top of the door's interior.

== Exterior ==
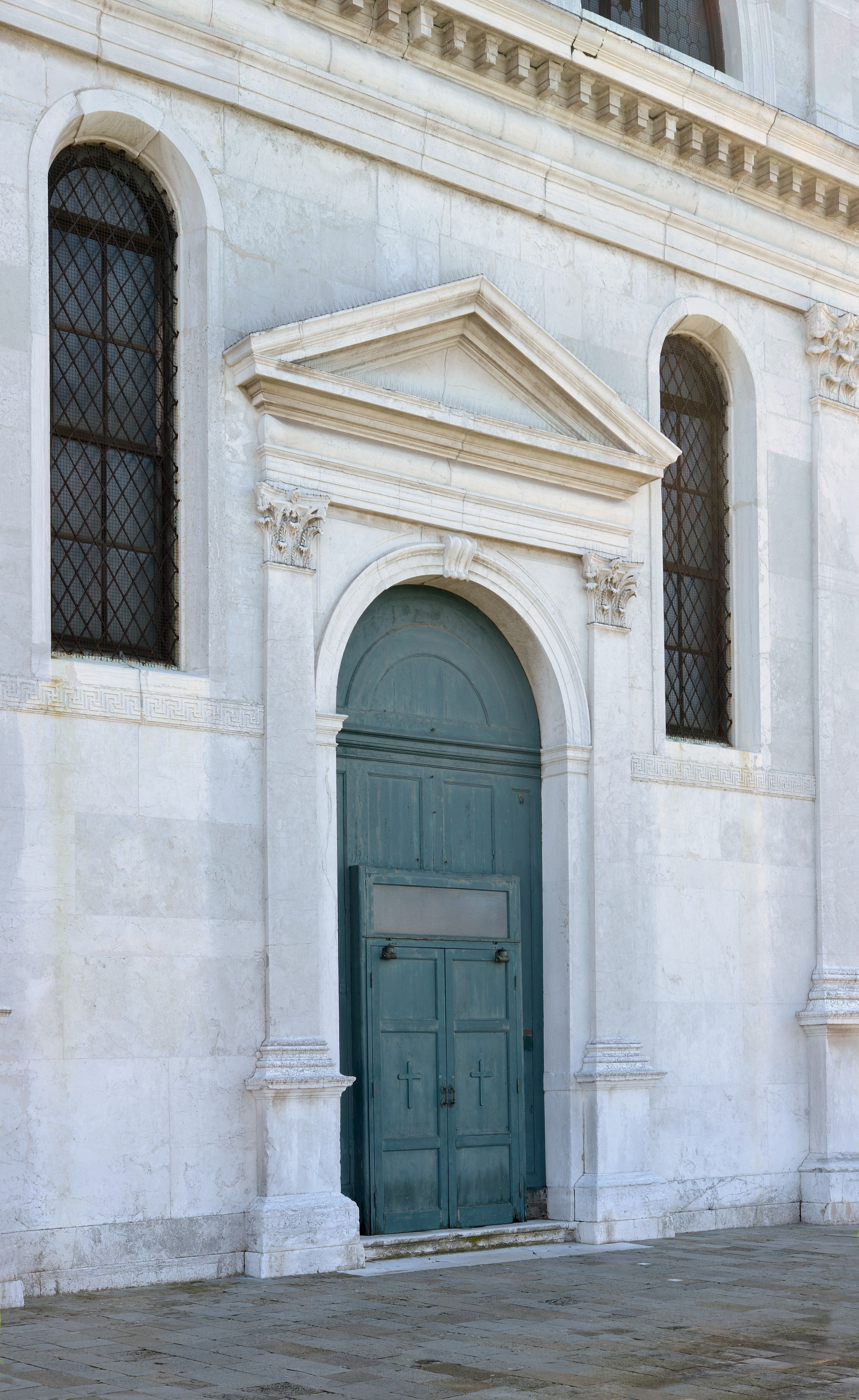
Portal of Le Zitelle

In typical Palladian style, a small temple front with Corinthian pilasters adorns the exterior of the front door. This is framed within a larger temple front with two-story Corinthian pilasters with a massive hemispherical, thermal window above the door. Two small bell towers jut from the top of the larger temple front, partially hiding the dome right behind. The dome is topped with a lantern equally as tall as the flanking bell towers.

The Church's front facade is covered in flat, white stucco which contrasts the red clay tile roof. Residential portions of the complex are of brick construction, with three divisions of windows, and topped with the same red clay tile roof. The white stucco used to stretch over all faces of the church, but has recently begun to fall off.

== See also ==
- 16th-century Western domes
