= Vitale II Michiel =

Doge of Venice from 1155 to 1172

- Dux Venetiae atque Dalmatiae sive Chroaciae • Protosebastos
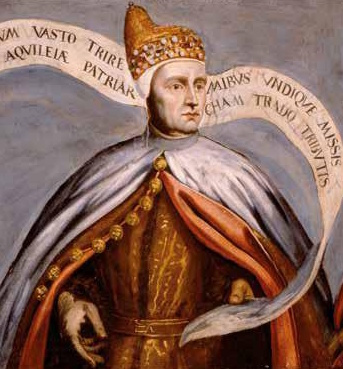
- Portrait of Vitale II Michiel from the Chamber of the Great Council in the Doge's Palace (Domenico Tintoretto, 1570s)

Doge of Venice
- Reign: February 1155 – 28 May 1172
- Predecessor: Domenico Morosini
- Successor: Sebastiano Ziani
- Vice-doge: Leonardo Michiel (September 1171 – May 1172)
- Born: Vitale Michiel c. 1110; Venice, Republic of Venice
- Died: 28 May 1172 (aged c. 62); Venice, Republic of Venice
- Burial: 1172; Church of San Zaccaria
- Spouse: Maria
- Issue more...: Leonardo Michiel; Nicolò Michiel; Richelda Michiel; Agnese Michiel; Anna Michiel (?)
Regnal name
- Vitale II Michiel
- House: Michiel
- Father: Unclear
- Occupation: Landowner

Vitale II Michiel (Venetian: Vidal Michiel, Latin: Vitalis Michael, c. 1110 - 28 May 1172) was a Venetian patrician, landowner and statesman who reigned as the 38th Doge of Venice from February 1155 until his assassination in 1172. Michiel was the last doge to be elevated by acclamation of the popular assembly (Concio), the traditional method of election, which was subsequently abandoned as the Venetian political system became increasingly dominated by the city's aristocracy. His reign therefore occupies an important position in the political transformation of the Republic of Venice, shortly before the formal establishment of a more restricted electoral system following his death.

During Michiel's seventeen-year reign, Venice strengthened its position along the eastern Adriatic and intervened more actively in the political affairs of northern Italy. Venetian forces recovered Zadar from Hungarian control and extended Venetian authority over several Dalmatian islands, while Michiel supported the papal party during the conflict between Alexander III and Frederick Barbarossa. Venice subsequently became involved in the formation of the Veronese League and maintained important commercial privileges in the Crusader states.

His relations with the Byzantine Empire, however, deteriorated steadily. Tensions arising from Byzantine commercial policy, Venice's rivalry with Genoa and Ancona, and Michiel's refusal to provide military assistance to Emperor Manuel I Komnenos culminated in the Byzantine arrest of Venetian merchants and the confiscation of their property in March 1171. Michiel responded by leading a large naval expedition against the Byzantine Empire. Although the Venetian fleet captured several positions in the Aegean, the expedition was devastated by disease and failed to obtain the restoration of Venetian property or a satisfactory settlement. Michiel eventually ordered the fleet to withdraw to Venice. The failure of the expedition provoked widespread dissatisfaction which culminated in his assassination on 28 May 1172.

== Biography ==
=== Early life and family ===
He was presumably born in Venice in the early 12th century; modern genealogists consider him to have been the son of Doge Domenico Michiel (r. 1117–1129), but there is no evidence proving this relationship. The fact that Vitale's descendants lived in the parish of San Giuliano suggests that he was more probably connected to the branch of the family that had settled in that area beginning with the judge Andrea Michiel "the Elder", who died around 1125. On the basis of these considerations, it is not possible to identify with certainty the branch of the Michiel family to which Vitale belonged, nor to reconstruct his life from documentation preceding his election as doge. In this earlier documentation, only one Vitale appears: he signed a commercial document in Constantinople in 1147.

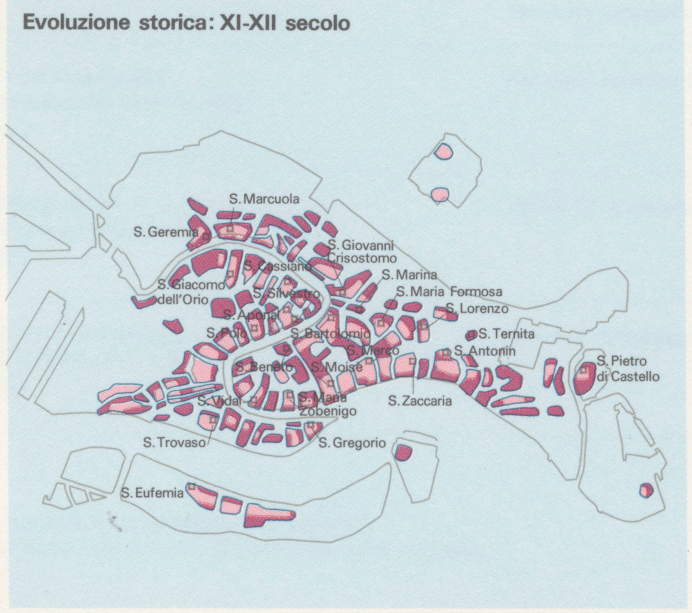
Urban development of Venice in the 11th-12th centuries

His and his heirs' property affairs after that date are better documented. From 1157 onward, Michiel is recorded as granting loans to private individuals in exchange for guarantees consisting of land and salt pans, mostly in the area of Chioggia. In some cases the loans were not repaid, and Michiel acquired possession of the properties concerned, expanding his holdings in the southern part of the Duchy of Venice (Dogado). His wealth consisted of cultivated land and entire foundations of salt pans. These possessions, together with properties that he already privately or publicly owned and had regularly purchased, passed intact after Michiel's death into the hands of his male heirs.

=== Dogeship ===
Michiel succeeded Domenico Morosini, who died in February 1155. He was elected by acclamation of the popular assembly (Concio), the traditional body representing the Venetian citizenry. Michiel's first known act of government was the renewal, in 1155, of a concession granted by his predecessor to a consortium of private individuals concerning the exploitation of property owned by the Commune of Venice in Constantinople, in exchange for a monetary rent, which was regularly paid in 1156. In the same year, however, Emperor Manuel I Komnenos granted important commercial privileges to the Republic of Genoa, attempting to counterbalance the excessive weight that the Venetians had acquired in the economic activities of the Byzantine Empire. Venice then approached Genoa's main rival, the Republic of Pisa, for the first time, seeking cooperation against Genoa, although this did not produce results for the time being.

==== Conflict in Dalmatia ====
Michiel had inherited from Morosini a series of unresolved issues. The first concerned Dalmatia, which since the 1130s had been divided into a northern area controlled by Venice, a central area subject to Hungarian rule, and a southern area centred on Ragusa (Dubrovnik), still at least nominally subject to the Byzantine Empire. Added to this was the conflict between the episcopal sees of Zadar and Split, subject to different political sovereignties, both of which aspired to become the metropolitan see of all Dalmatia. As early as 1154, Pope Anastasius IV had raised Zadar to the rank of archbishopric and incorporated the dioceses of Rab and Osor into the Patriarchate of Grado. In 1155, his successor Pope Adrian IV placed the see of Zadar under the metropolitan jurisdiction of Grado and granted Patriarch Enrico Dandolo the title of primate of Dalmatia, with the right to consecrate the archbishop, while reserving the granting of the pallium to the pope. The measure effectively gave the Venetian Church ecclesiastical control over Dalmatia, with the sole exception of Ragusa.

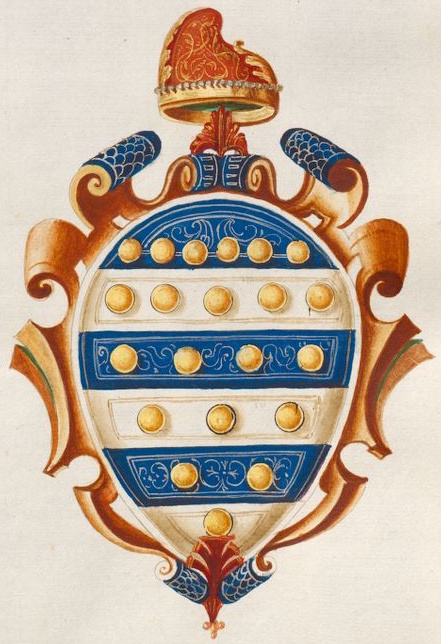
Attributed arms of Vitale II Michiel as depicted in the Insignia Venetorum

The Kingdom of Hungary did not accept the new situation and fomented a revolt in Zadar that led its supporters to seize the city and expel the Venetian governor, Domenico Morosini, who ruled it with the title of count. Michiel reacted immediately, intervening in 1156. The stages of the campaign are poorly known, but it appears that the Venetian forces were repelled by the Hungarian contingent sent to garrison Zadar and forced to abandon their objective. Michiel nevertheless sent Patriarch Dandolo to Rome to request papal support, and in 1157 Adrian IV wrote directly to Michiel, confirming the supremacy of the Church of Grado over the see of Zadar. At the same time, however, the pope recommended that the patriarch be received honourably upon his return to his homeland, bringing to an end the disputes that had continued for almost a decade between the patriarchate and the Commune for internal reasons. Venetian ecclesiastical control over Dalmatia nevertheless remained nominal, while civil control was still only an aspiration.

Michiel therefore planned a new expedition against Zadar. In preparation for it, in November 1158 he ordered Venetians present in the Byzantine Empire to return to their homeland by Easter (12 April) 1159, and those in the Crusader states to do the same by September of the same year. The order was disobeyed by those too deeply involved in their commercial activities to comply. Consequently, these men, among them the famous merchant Romano Mairano (Note: Romano Mairano is one of the few 12th-century Venetian merchants whose life and commercial activities are known in considerable detail. This is particularly significant because Venice did not yet customarily keep registers of notarial acts. The relatively detailed knowledge of Mairano's career is largely due to the fortunate survival of his family's papers: his last descendant was a nun at the Church of San Zaccaria and deposited the family documents in the monastery's archive.) were condemned to a monetary penalty. In the autumn of 1159, however, the Venetians returned to Dalmatia in force. Zadar was stormed and the Hungarian garrison was forced to withdraw. The inhabitants had to renew their oath of allegiance to Venice and accept that the government of the city be entrusted to a Venetian, namely Count Domenico Morosini. Probably at the same time or shortly afterwards, Michiel appointed his son Leonardo to govern the islands of Cres and Lošinj and his son Nicolò to govern Rab, both with the title of count. Venice thus imposed direct control, while formally respecting local prerogatives, over the strategic centres along the Dalmatian coast and the islands in the Kvarner Gulf. This process was completed in 1163, when Michiel granted the county of Krk to Bartholomew and Guy, sons of the deceased Count Dujam, so that they might govern it as vassals of Venice.

==== Relations with the Papacy and the Empire ====
On the Italian front, Michiel's determined support for Pope Alexander III, elected in 1159, and for the Latin Church in its struggle against Emperor Frederick I Barbarossa is particularly noteworthy. His support for the papal cause, which also took the form of providing refuge in Venice to ecclesiastics loyal to the new pope, earned the hostility of the Holy Roman Empire. As retaliation, Frederick first imposed a commercial blockade, leaving only the maritime routes open, and then ordered a military action by the inland cities connected to the Empire, with the aim of subduing Venice.

At the beginning of 1162, the allied forces of Padua, Verona, and Ferrara forced the surrender of the Venetian garrison of the castle of Cavarzere. A Venetian naval squadron then sailed up the River Po, put the attackers to flight, reoccupied the castle, and seized and sacked Adria and Ariano. Probably during the same year, Ulrich II of Treffen, Patriarch of Aquileia, laid siege to Grado. Michiel's reaction was immediate: all available ships were sent towards the city and, after landing, their crews defeated the invaders, taking numerous prisoners, including the patriarch and several nobles accompanying him. On their return, the fleet repelled an attack on Caorle carried out by the people of Treviso. The patriarch remained a prisoner in Venice for some time and was later released in exchange for the payment of an annual tribute.

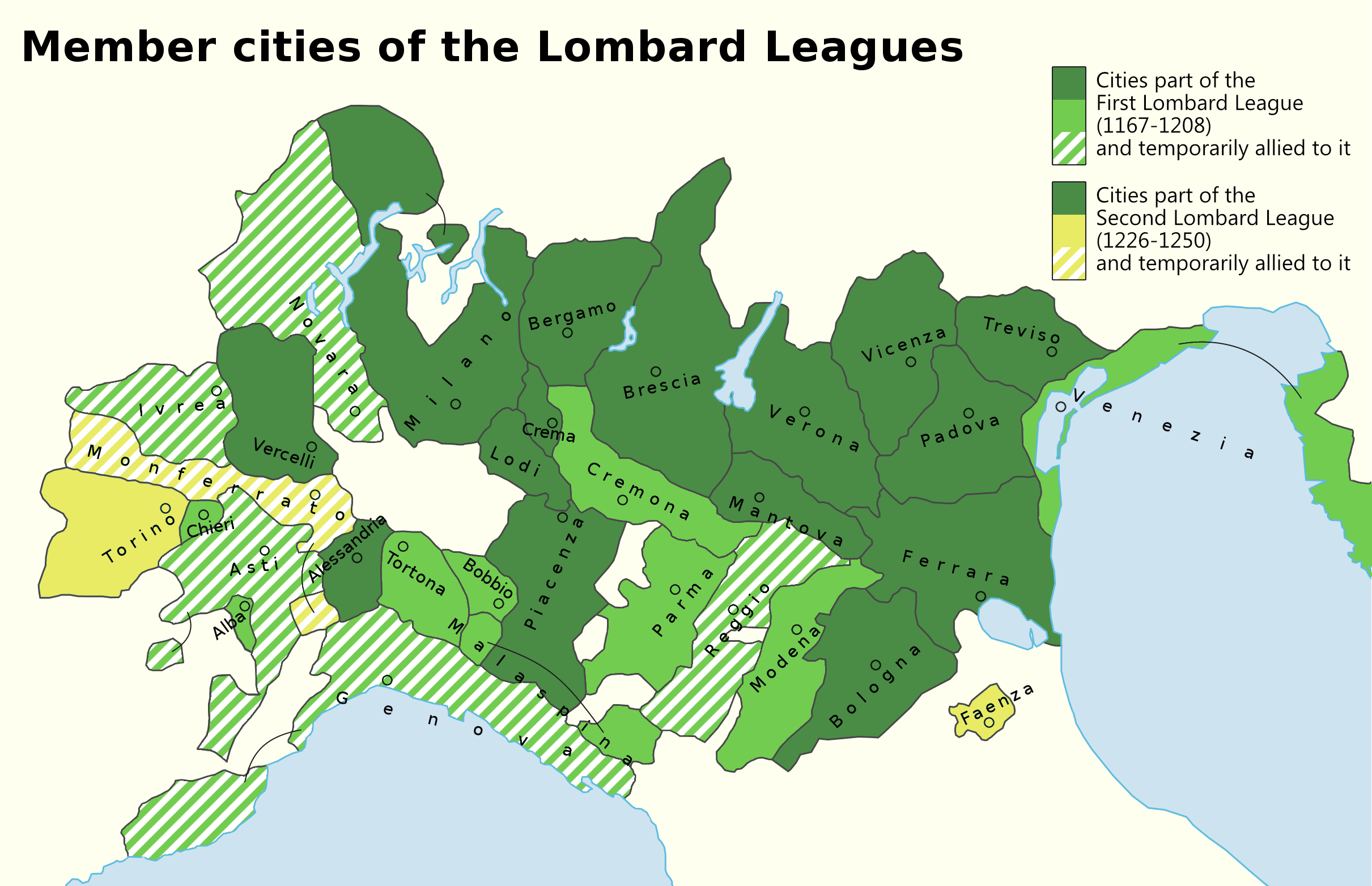
Member cities of the first and second Lombard League

Having failed in the military option, Barbarossa sought the support of Pisa and Genoa, the latter of which he expressly allowed to harass Venetian commerce until Venice had regained the emperor's favour. Michiel responded through diplomatic action that detached several Venetian cities from the imperial party. In 1164, on Venetian initiative, the Veronese League was established. Verona, Padua, and Vicenza joined it, followed by Treviso and smaller communes of the Venetian hinterland. Venice sided with the rebellious communes and provided financial support. To secure this support, in June 1164 Michiel had to assign the revenues of the Rialto market for eleven years to several wealthy citizens, who had lent the Commune 1,150 marks of silver in the form of a voluntary loan.

In 1167, several of the major Lombard communes and the members of the Veronese League formed the Lombard League. In this way, the most critical moment for the Venetians in the West was overcome. In the following years there was never a direct military confrontation between Michiel and Barbarossa, and until 1177 Venice took no major initiatives in the struggle between the Empire, the communes, and the Papacy. In 1167, Bohemond III of Antioch also granted privileges to Venetian merchants operating in his territories. Venetian interests were thus secured in the principal maritime ports of the Kingdom of Jerusalem and the Principality of Antioch.

==== Relations with Byzantium ====
The aggressive Italian policy of Manuel I Komnenos, Venice's failure to participate in the war launched by the emperor against Hungary, and Byzantine support for Ancona, Venice's principal commercial competitor in the Adriatic, inevitably worsened relations between Venice and Byzantium. At the end of 1167, Michiel rejected requests from several Byzantine ambassadors who had specifically come to Venice to seek military assistance in the event of a new conflict with the Normans of Sicily.

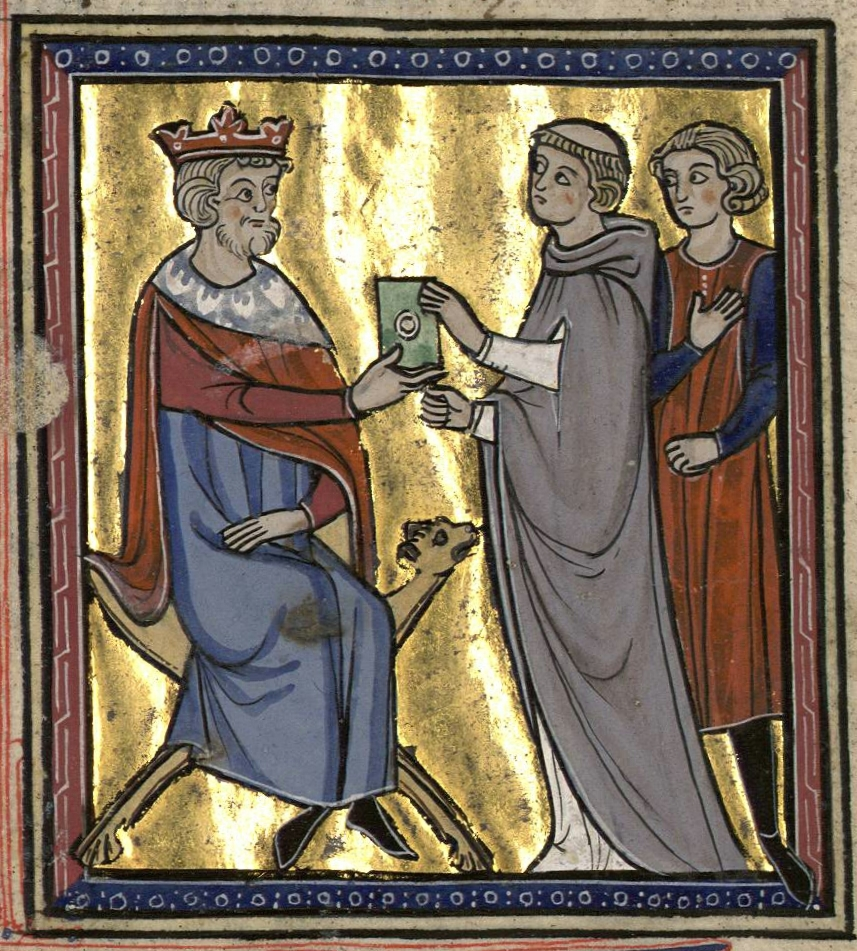
Western depiction of Manuel I Komnenos, 13th century

Indeed, shortly afterwards, probably in 1168, Michiel promoted, in a clearly anti-Byzantine move, the marriage of his son Leonardo to a Serbian princess, the daughter of Desa, Grand Prince of Serbia, who had fled in 1166 to the Hungarian court to escape Byzantine domination. His other son Nicolò, married a Hungarian princess, daughter of King Stephen III. In the same year, 1168, Michiel also led a punitive expedition against Ancona, which was allied with Byzantium. A definitive rupture did not yet occur, however, since Michiel continued to grant privileges to churches and monasteries possessing property and rights in the Byzantine Empire.

==== The Byzantine–Venetian War ====
On 12 March 1171, Manuel I suddenly ordered the arrest of Venetian citizens present in the Empire and the confiscation of their property. The Venetians were caught by surprise and were imprisoned in large numbers. Only the few who managed to escape capture in various parts of the Empire survived, together with those in Constantinople who boarded the ship of Romano Mairano, which sailed for Acre while escaping the imperial vessels. The reasons for the episode, which brought economic ruin to many small merchants, many of whom had still not been compensated for the damages they suffered many years later, are not entirely clear. According to the Venetian version, Manuel I had acted deliberately out of revenge for Michiel's refusal to assist Byzantium in 1167 and out of greed, wishing to seize the Venetians' property. The Byzantine version instead emphasized Venice's arrogance towards the Empire, the excessive number of Venetians residing there, which created serious social problems, and the refusal to compensate for the damage caused by an assault they had carried out against the Genoese quarter of Constantinople in 1170.

The news quickly reached Venice. Although there was initially an intention to proceed cautiously by sending an embassy to Constantinople, the war party prevailed. In September 1171, a fleet of 100 galleys under Michiel's command sailed eastwards. During the journey, the fleet was reinforced by another ten galleys provided by the Istrian and Dalmatian subjects. Thirty galleys were diverted towards Trogir, which was loyal to the Komnenos dynasty. The city was captured and sacked, and its walls were partially demolished. The remaining ships continued to Ragusa, which was besieged and forced to surrender within a few days, accepting a Venetian governor. The fleet then entered the Aegean and reached the island of Euboea (Negroponte), where it besieged the capital, Chalcis.

The local Byzantine commander, in order to avoid the worst, assured Michiel that the confiscated property would be returned if an embassy were sent to Constantinople. Michiel sent as ambassadors the bishop of Jesolo, Pasquale, who knew Greek, and nobleman Manasse Badoer. Meanwhile, the siege of Chalcis was lifted, and the Venetian forces occupied Chios, where it spent the winter, carrying out repeated raids against coastal cities of the Empire. The two ambassadors, having reached the capital, were unable to meet Manuel I and were recalled, although they had obtained assurances that peace might be concluded. With them was an imperial representative who urged the dispatch of a new embassy. The two previous ambassadors, together with a third, again travelled to the capital. During this second mission, an epidemic broke out among the Venetian crews, causing the deaths of about a thousand men within a short time.

Meanwhile, an imperial fleet approached Chios, and in the first days of April 1172 the occupants abandoned their position and moved to the island of Kyra Panagia. There, however, the disease showed no sign of abating and continued to claim victims. The three ambassadors who had departed from Chios arrived at Kyra Panagia but, as before, returned empty-handed, bringing with them another imperial representative who advised the dispatch of a new embassy.

This time the nobleman and future doge Enrico Dandolo (Note: Not to be confused with the aforementioned homonymous Patriarch.) and Filippo Greco travelled to Constantinople, while the epidemic continued to claim victims. The Venetians moved to Lesbos and then attempted to reach Lemnos, but bad sea conditions forced them to land on Skyros, where they spent Easter (16 April) 1172. At this point, however, the lack of tangible successes and the uncertainty of achieving concrete results generated widespread discontent among the members of the expedition, to the point of inducing Michiel to order a retreat. The fleet therefore sailed back to Venice, pursued and harassed by Byzantine ships. The great fleet that had sailed the previous year returned to its homeland humiliated and effectively defeated, decimated by the epidemic, which had not yet been eradicated and spread through the city, causing further deaths. Meanwhile, the third embassy sent to Constantinople ended in failure like the previous ones. An erroneous tradition maintains that on this occasion Enrico Dandolo was blinded by the emperor.

== Assassination ==
Discontent was so great that a few days after his return to Venice, on 28 May 1172, during a public assembly, Michiel was subjected to severe criticism for the conduct of the operations and was abandoned by his advisers. He was struck by a rioter, Marco Casulo, who was later executed, and died shortly afterwards from his severe wounds near the Church of San Zaccaria. Michiel was buried at San Zaccaria. Following Michiel's death, the Great Council of Venice was established as an elective body, marking a decisive step towards the aristocratic and oligarchic form of the Venetian state and the restriction of the doge's powers. It was established that the doge would be elected by eleven electors appointed by the same council. At the same time, it was decreed that the doge should always be assisted by six councillors, representing the city's six sestieri (Subdivisions). Michiel was succeeded as doge by Sebastiano Ziani.

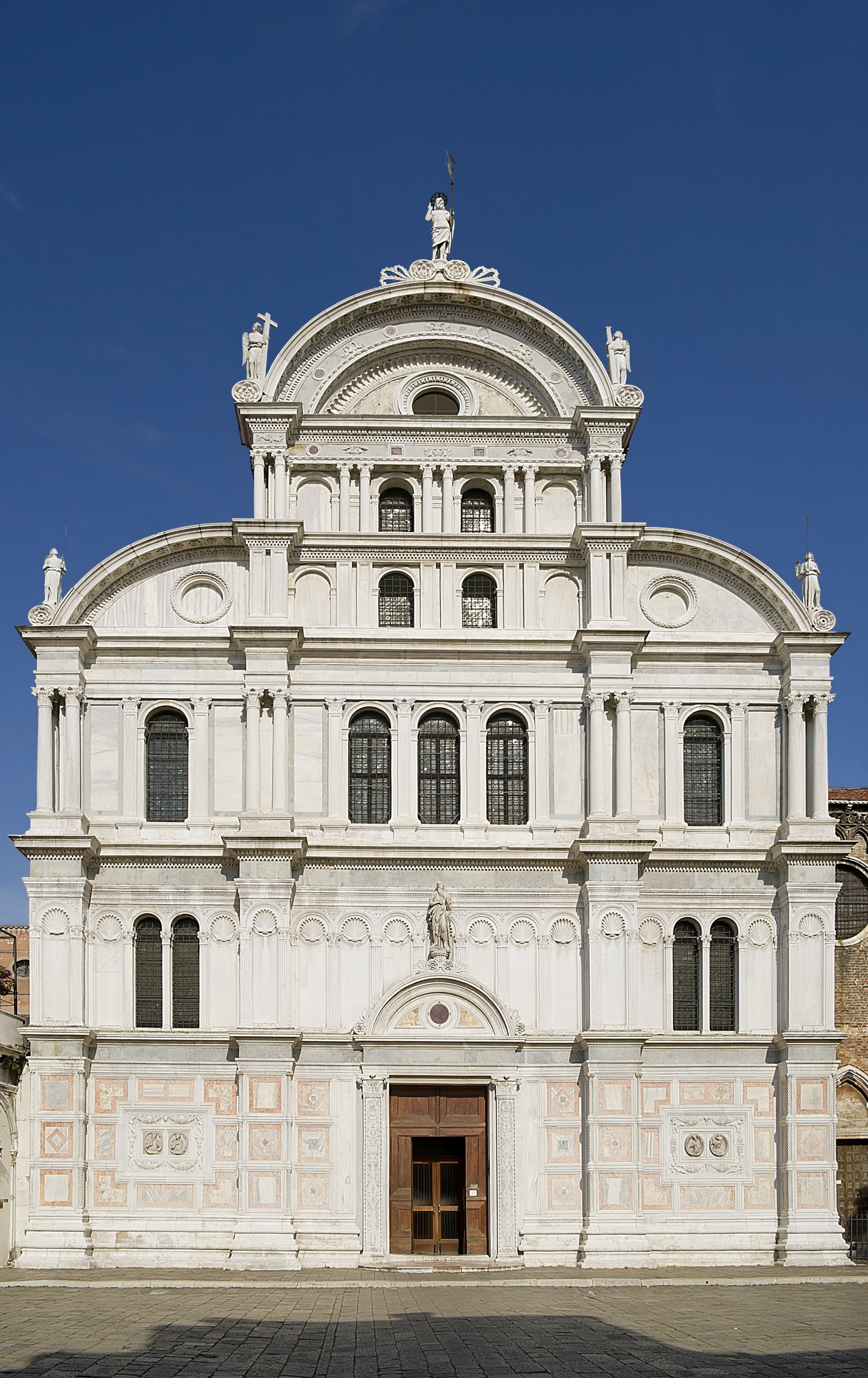
Church of San Zaccaria in Venice

=== Historiographical assessment ===
The circumstances of Vitale II Michiel's death are described with increasing detail and interpretation in Venetian historiography. While the earliest accounts portray him primarily as the victim of popular anger following the failed Byzantine expedition, later historians increasingly connected his murder with the financial burdens of the war, political discontent, and broader changes in the Venetian constitution.

- The earliest surviving accounts generally portray Michiel as the victim of popular anger rather than a premeditated conspiracy. The Cronica di Venexia detta di Enrico Dandolo states that, after returning to Venice in May 1172, Michiel went to the Church of San Zaccaria at Easter, as his predecessors had customarily done, where he was killed by "some of his citizens and wicked men". The account neither identifies the assailant nor suggests the existence of a wider conspiracy.
- Writing in the early 16th century, Pietro Marcello describes Michiel as being publicly blamed for the disaster. The Venetians accused him of having squandered the opportunity for victory, lost the fleet, and exposed it to the alleged Byzantine poisoning of the water. They called him a "traitor to the Republic" and demanded his death. Michiel secretly left the assembly after realizing that his life was in danger, but encountered an unidentified assailant who inflicted the wound from which he died. Marcello does not associate the murder with any particular political faction.
- Francesco Sansovino gives a shorter account in which an epidemic broke out in Venice and Michiel was blamed for it before the people rose against him. Alessandro Maria Vianoli likewise omits the detailed assembly narrative and places the murder on Easter Day 1172, while Michiel was travelling to San Zaccaria. He identifies the murderer as Marco Casulo and states that Michiel's successor had him discovered and hanged.
- Jacob von Sandrart also portrays Michiel as the victim of a popular uprising, but suggests that the loans contracted for the war may have contributed to the hostility against him. He further states that the Venetians soon regretted the murder and recognized Michiel's efforts to secure peace and defend the state's commercial interests.
- In the 18th century, Johann Friedrich LeBret interprets the episode in strongly moral and constitutional terms. He presents the population as seeking a scapegoat for the military catastrophe and accuses Michiel of negligence and excessive credulity in continuing negotiations with the Byzantines. According to his account, an armed crowd forced its way into the palace, while Michiel escaped through a rear entrance towards San Zaccaria and was pursued and stabbed by one of the rioters. LeBret stresses the immediate regret of the population and the condemnation of the attack by respectable citizens. He consequently interprets the events of 1172 as part of a broader transformation of the Venetian constitution, in which both popular violence and the arbitrary authority of the Doge were subjected to greater institutional restraints. He also considers the financial obligations incurred under Michiel potentially important in generating hostility towards his government.
- Samuele Romanin gives greater attention to the documentary evidence and connects the political discontent with the financial measures adopted to finance the expedition. He emphasises the burden imposed on wealthy Venetians by the loans and regards this as one of the factors behind the hostility towards Michiel. In his reconstruction, the Doge summoned an assembly to defend his conduct but fled when the situation became threatening and was killed near San Zaccaria by members of the enraged crowd. Romanin thus combines two explanations found separately in earlier accounts: anger over the military disaster and resentment over its financial consequences.
- Writing in the early 20th century, Heinrich Kretschmayr adopts a more critical view of the traditional judgement of Michiel. Although Venetian sources accuse the Doge of political and military incompetence, particularly for continuing negotiations with the Byzantines while the fleet was being devastated by disease, Kretschmayr argues that the circumstances were more complex. Michiel also had to consider the Venetians still imprisoned in the Byzantine Empire, and the failure of the expedition may have resulted partly from circumstances beyond his control. He therefore questions the later characterisation of Michiel as lacking "statesmanlike and military capacity". Kretschmayr also rejects the traditional claim that Manuel I deliberately caused the epidemic by poisoning the water, treating it as a hostile legend preserved by Venetian historiography. In his reconstruction, Michiel was killed in a popular uprising on 27 or 28 May 1172 by Marco Casulo, who was subsequently arrested and hanged.

== Marriage and children ==
Vitale Michiel married a woman named Maria, whose family name is unknown. A later tradition identified her with Felicita Maria di Boemondo, purported to be a daughter of an unclear Bohemond of Antioch. They had four children:

- Leonardo Michiel — Count of Osor, and later vice-doge of Venice during his father's absence in 1171. He first married a Serbian princess, daughter of Desa, Grand Prince of Serbia, and later Adelasina, daughter of Isnardino of Lendinara. He died before December 1184.
- Nicolò Michiel — Count of Rab. He married a Hungarian princess, daughter of King Stephen III. He survived his brother Leonardo by approximately a decade.
- Agnese Michiel — married Giovanni Dandolo.
- Richelda Michiel — married a member of the comital family of Padua and was consequently known as a countess.

Vitale kept his children economically and legally attached to himself for a long time, in accordance with a tradition rooted in families of ancient origin such as the Michiel, until February 1171, when he emancipated them and assigned them part of his immovable property.

An additional daughter, Anna Michiel, is attributed to Vitale Michiel by later tradition. According to ancient chronicles, she married Nicolò Giustinian, who supposedly obtained special permission from the pope to leave the convent of San Nicolò al Lido in order to continue the Giustinian lineage, whose male members were said to have all died as a result of plague and warfare in Byzantium. The chronicles further relate that, after having children, Giustinian returned to his monastery, while Anna retired to the convent of San Adriano in Torcello. These accounts, however, are contradicted by contemporary notarial records, which attest to several members of the Giustinian family living at the time.

=== Leonardo Michiel ===
The better known of his two sons was Leonardo. In 1165 he became involved in a dispute with Count Domenico Morosini, who claimed possession of half of the county of Osor, which had been granted to Leonardo by Vitale. Leonardo instead claimed the comitatus on the basis of a perpetual investiture from Vitale. The latter, with the consent of the judges accompanying him, ruled in favour of his son because, unlike his opponent, Leonardo had demonstrated that he had paid an adequate sum to the Commune for the investiture.

Leonardo retained control of Cres and Lošinj until his death. In 1171, Leonardo assumed the government of Venice while Michiel was engaged in the naval expedition against the Byzantine Empire. On this occasion he made the mistake of solemnly authenticating a forged placitum attributed to a nonexistent tenth-century doge, presented to him by the monks of the Monastery of Saints Felix and Fortunatus in Ammiana in the course of a dispute between them and the bishopric of Torcello. After his father's death Leonardo married Adelasina, daughter of Isnardino of Lendinara, a member of the influential Veronese capitaneal family that took its name from the eponymous castle. The marriage contract was drawn up at Verona on 1 December 1172, in the presence of several leading citizens, including Count Sauro. Among the Venetians present were Leonardo's brother and the future doge Enrico Dandolo.

The wife brought among other things as her dowry a property at Zevio on the Adige, where the Venetian monastery of San Zaccaria had long held interests. The branch of the Michiel family to which the doge and his sons belonged was closely connected with this monastery. In 1174, the two brothers dissolved the commercial partnership in which they had participated and divided the movable and immovable property that they had until then held jointly. Leonardo participated in an embassy sent in 1175 by Doge Sebastiano Ziani to Constantinople in the unsuccessful attempt to reach a settlement with Manuel I. He is also among the witnesses to a privilege granted by Emperor Frederick I Barbarossa to the monastery of San Giorgio Maggiore in 1177. In August 1184, Leonardo made his will, appointing the abbess of the monastery of San Zaccaria as his testamentary executor and transferring a large part of his property to the monastery. He died before December 1184.

== Insignia and coinage ==
=== Monetary policy ===
Vitale II Michiel's dogeship marked an important stage in the development of an independent Venetian monetary system. By the middle of the 12th century, Venice had largely ceased producing its own coinage and relied extensively on foreign currencies, particularly coins circulating in the markets of northern Italy. During the final decades of the century, however, Venetian mints resumed more regular activity, and the city gradually began to establish a monetary system of its own. The first distinctly Venetian coin of this renewed period was the albulus, or blanco, issued under Michiel. The albulus weighed approximately 0.517 grams and contained only about 70‰ silver, making it a low-value denomination intended primarily for small transactions. It has traditionally been described as a half-denarius, although more precisely it represented approximately one third of a denarius. Its relatively low silver content and small weight distinguished it from the higher-value denarii that were subsequently introduced under Sebastiano Ziani (r. 1172–1178).

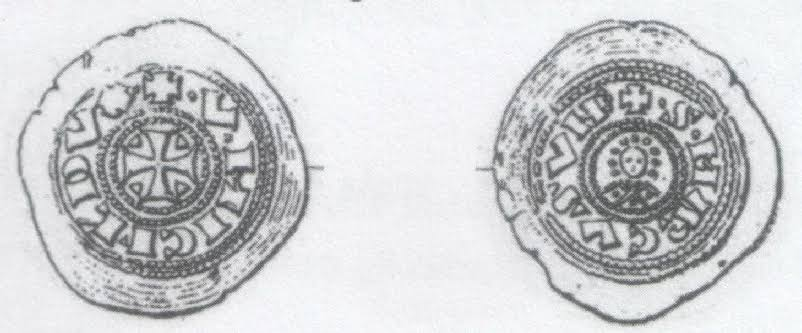
Half-denarius of Vitale II Michiel

The denomination nevertheless represented an important development in Venetian monetary history because it was specifically associated with the Venetian ducal government rather than reproducing the monetary authority of a foreign ruler. The significance of Michiel's albulus lies particularly in its inscriptions. Instead of bearing the name of the Holy Roman Emperor, as had been customary on much of the coinage circulating in the Venetian area, the coin identified the Venetian ruler himself. By placing the doge's name on its coinage, Venice asserted its own authority over the production and regulation of currency. The albulus therefore provides material evidence for the broader political transformation taking place during Michiel's dogeship, when Venice was progressively strengthening its autonomy from the Byzantine and imperial political frameworks within which the Venetian duchy had historically developed.

The introduction of the albulus should not, however, be interpreted as evidence that Venice had already established a fully independent and comprehensive monetary system. Foreign currencies continued to circulate widely, and the Venetian monetary system developed gradually over the following decades. Under Michiel's successor Sebastiano Ziani, the Venetian mint resumed the production of denarii. These coins likewise carried the name of the doge on the obverse and that of Saint Mark the Evangelist on the reverse, reinforcing the association between Venetian coinage, the ducal office and the city's patron saint. The development initiated under Michiel subsequently contributed to the emergence of the libra denariorum venetiarium, the Venetian monetary system based on the denarius. Between 1172 and 1184, Venetian and Veronese lire were still recorded as being accepted alongside one another in markets frequented by Venetian merchants, but the two monetary systems subsequently diverged. By 1194, the Venetian and Veronese lire were no longer interchangeable. The disappearance of Veronese denarii from the Rialto market after 1172 may indicate the intervention of the Venetian government, although no surviving decree records such a measure.

=== Ducal seal ===
==== Background ====
A lead seal attributed to Vitale II Michiel is now preserved in the Numismatic Museum of Athens. Like the other surviving ducal seals of this period, it depicts the reigning doge receiving the insignia of his office from Saint Mark the Evangelist while wearing ceremonial dress. Such representations are significant not only for the study of the development of ducal clothing and insignia, but also for the evolution of the ceremonies surrounding the election and investiture of the doge. They are particularly relevant to the political transformation of Venice during the 12th century, when the city progressively moved from its traditional position within the Byzantine political sphere towards greater institutional and political autonomy.

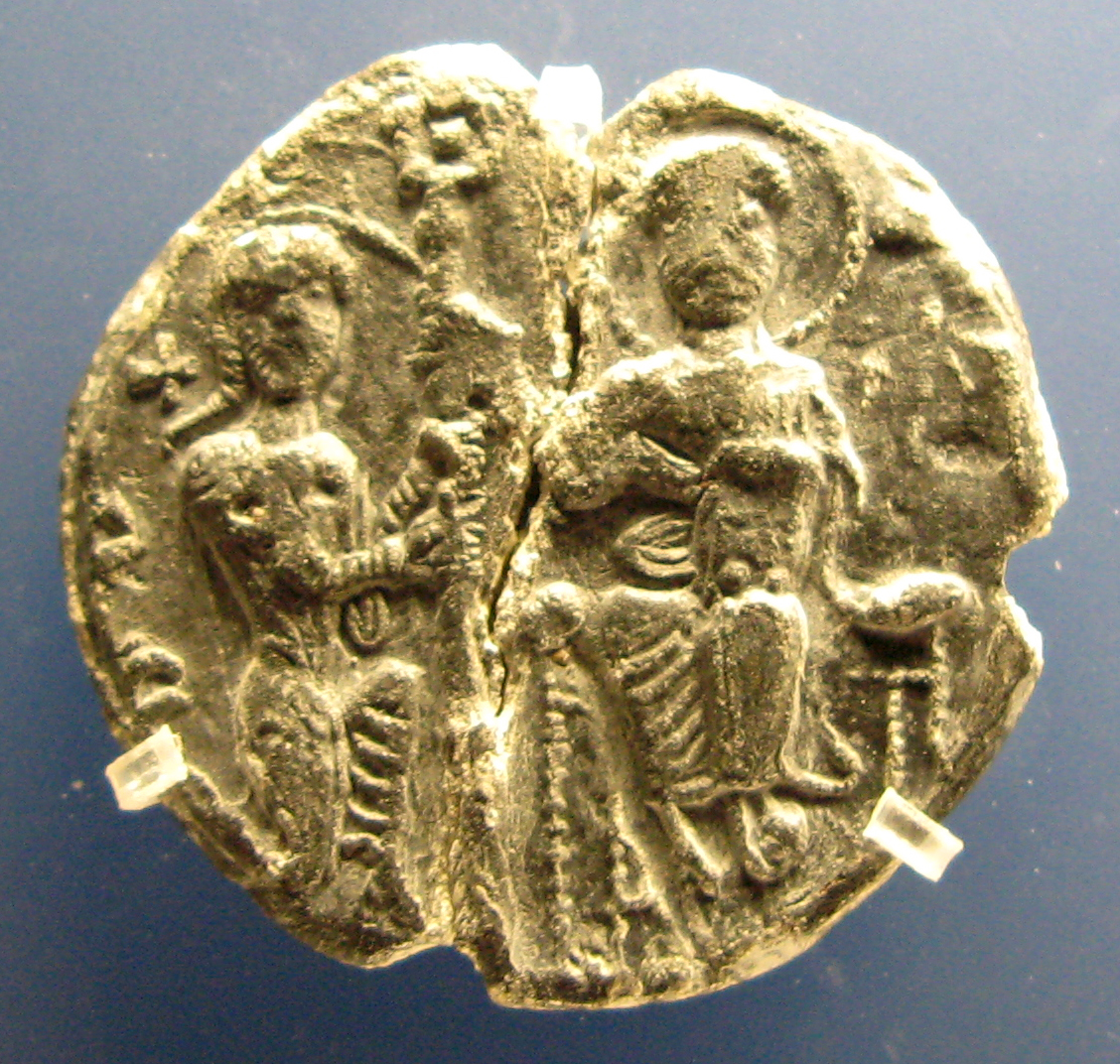
Seal attributed to Vitale II Michiel

Michiel's seal belongs to the first phase of the development of Venetian ducal sigillography, which can be traced from the seal of Pietro Polani (r. 1130–1148) through those of Domenico Morosini (r. 1148–1156) and Sebastiano Ziani (r. 1172–1178). Although the general iconographic scheme remained substantially unchanged until the dogeship of Reniero Zeno (r. 1253–1268), differences can be observed between three principal phases in the production of ducal seals from the first half of the 12th to the second half of the 13th century. These changes concern principally the clothing and position of the figures on the obverse, whereas the reverse generally remained simpler and carried the name and titles of the reigning doge. The early seals are also poorly preserved in several cases, making the details of the doges' clothing difficult to establish.

The evidence for Vitale II Michiel was for a long time particularly problematic. No surviving seal was known to Agostino Pertusi when he examined the development of the ducal insignia in his studies. On the basis of this absence, Pertusi suggested that the iconography of Michiel's seal might have differed from the established type and considered the possibility that his representation could have presented a distinctive form of the ducal insignia. The subsequent identification of a lead seal belonging to Vitale II Michiel, now preserved in the Numismatic Museum of Athens, provides direct evidence with which to examine his representation and places his dogeship within the development of the early Venetian seal tradition.

==== Iconography ====
On the obverse of Michiel's seal, Saint Mark the Evangelist is represented on the right and the doge on the left. The saint is shown bareheaded and nimbate, seated upon a throne and wearing episcopal vestments. In his left hand he holds the Gospel, resting it upon his knee, while with his right hand he holds a long staff which he extends towards the doge. Vitale Michiel stands opposite him and grasps the staff with his hands. The two figures are identified by inscriptions placed within the field of the seal and along the staff. The composition thus presents Michiel in the act of receiving the insignia of his office from Saint Mark, following the established visual formula used for the Venetian doges of the period.

Michiel's clothing likewise corresponds to the early form of ducal representation described by Pertusi. The doge wears a long garment reaching towards the feet, with long, close-fitting sleeves and a belt around the waist. The arrangement of the garment, including its vertical folds or decoration, gives the figure a formal and ceremonial appearance. Rather than functioning as a realistic portrait of Michiel, the image presents him according to the conventional visual language of the ducal office.

== Legacy ==
During Michiel's dogeship, the Feast of Fat Thursday was supposedly instituted to commemorate the Venetian victory over the Patriarch of Aquileia. According to later tradition, a bull and twelve pigs, representing the patriarch and twelve canons, were beheaded during the celebrations. Tradition also attributes to Michiel's reign the transport to Venice of the two columns that stand in St Mark's Square (Piazzetta). A later legend claimed that there had originally been three columns, one of which fell into the sea.

Michiel is depicted in the posthumous series of official portraits of the doges of Venice in the Doge's Palace. The original gallery was established in the 1360s under doge Marco Cornaro as a chronological sequence of Venetian rulers, each shown holding a scroll inscribed with a summary of his achievements. After the original paintings were destroyed in the fire of 1577, the series was recreated, with Domenico Tintoretto executing most of the surviving portraits. The scroll held by Michiel contains the following inscription in Latin:

IMPERIUM VASTO TRIREMIBUS UNDIQUE MISSIS / URBIS AQUILEIÆ PATRIARCHAM TRADO TRIBUTIS

[I ravage the Empire with triremes sent from every quarter; I subject the Patriarch of the city of Aquileia to tribute.]

== See also ==
- List of Doges of Venice
- Byzantine–Venetian war of 1171
- Lombard League

== Sources ==
- Mastandrea, Pedrocco (2017). i DOGI nei ritratti parlanti di Palazzo Ducale a Venezia. Cierre edizioni. ISBN 978-88-8314-902-3.
- Da Mosto, Andrea (1939). I DOGI DI VENEZIA con particolare riguardo alle loro tombe. Ferdinando Ongania.
- Stephenson, Paul (2000). Byzantium's Balkan Frontier: A Political Study of the Northern Balkans, 900–1204. Cambridge: Cambridge University Press. ISBN 978-0-521-77017-0.
- Pasqualin, Riccardo (2023). Venezia Ispanica. Castellammare di Stabia: Club di Autori Indipendenti.
- Praga, Giuseppe (1954). Storia della Dalmazia. Padua: Cedam.
- Pozza, Marco (1982). I Badoer. Una famiglia veneziana dal X al XIII secolo. Abano Terme: Francisci Editore.
- Herrin, Judith (2007). Byzantium: The Surprising Life of a Medieval Empire. Great Britain: Penguin Group. ISBN 978-0691143699.
- Madden, Thomas F. (2003). Enrico Dandolo and the Rise of Venice. Baltimore: Johns Hopkins University Press. ISBN 0-8018-7317-7.
- Nomadic Niko (2026). "The Numismatic Museum in Athens: The Building and Collection".
- Madden, Thomas (2012). Venice: A New History. United States: Penguin Group. ISBN 978-0147509802.
- Pozza, Marco (2010). "MICHIEL, Vitale - Enciclopedia - Treccani".
- Mezzaroba, Luca (2023). "Dalla bolla al grosso: VESTI E INSEGNE BIZANTINE dei primi dogi di Venezia".
- Pertusi, Agostino (1965). Quedam regalia insigna. Ricerche sulle insegne del potere ducale a Venezia durante il Medioevo. Studi Veneziani, volume VII.
- Robbert, Louise Buenger (1995). "Il sistema monetario - Storia di Venezia".
- Rösch, Gerhard (1992). "Mercatura e moneta - Storia di Venezia".
- Rösch, Gerhald (1995). "Storia di Venezia, Vol. 2 - L'età del Comune".
- Marcello, Pietro (1557). Vite de'prencipi di Vinegia. Pietrasanta.
- Pesce, Roberto (2010). Cronica di Venexia detta di Enrico Dandolo. Origini. Centro di Studi Medievali e Rinascimentali «Emmanuele Antonio Cicogna».
- Sansovino, Francesco (1581). Venetia città nobilissima et singolare, Descritta in XIIII. libri. Appresso Steffano Curti.
- Vianoli, Alessandro Maria (1680). Historia veneta di Alessandro Maria Vianoli nobile veneto. Gio. Giacomo Hertz.
- von Sandrart, Jacob (1686). Kurtze und vermehrte Beschreibung Von Dem Ursprung, Aufnehmen, Gebiete, und Regierung der Weltberühmten Republick Venedig.
- LeBret, Johann Friedrich (1769–1777). Staatsgeschichte der Republik Venedig. Johann Friedrich Hartknoch.
- Kretschmayr, Heinrich (1905). Geschichte von Venedig. Gotha: F. A. Perthes.
- Romanin, Samuele (1853–1861). Storia documentata di Venezia. Vencie: Pietro Naratovich.

Political offices
Preceded by Domenico Morosini	Doge of Venice; 1155-1172	Succeeded by Sebastiano Ziani
