= Felicita Maria di Boemondo =

Dogaressa of Venice (1155–1172)

Maria (died after 1172) was the wife of Doge Vitale II Michiel (r. 1155–1172) and Dogaressa of Venice from 1155 to 1172. Later Venetian tradition identifies her as Felicita Maria di Boemondo, a princess of Antioch and a daughter of an unclear Bohemond of Antioch, although her parentage is not securely established by contemporary sources.

As dogaressa, Maria was traditionally associated with the monastery of San Zaccaria, one of the most important religious institutions for women in medieval Venice. Later accounts describe her as a benefactor of the monastery and associate her closely with its religious community. According to tradition, Maria was at San Zaccaria when her husband was assassinated on 28 May 1172 following the failure of his expedition against the Byzantine Empire. She is said to have been so affected by his death that she chose to remain at the monastery for the rest of her life. The date and circumstances of Maria's death are unknown.

== Sources ==
- Staley, Edgcumbe: The dogaressas of Venice : The wives of the doges, London : T. W. Laurie, 1910
- Pozza, Marco (2010). "MICHIEL, Vitale - Enciclopedia - Treccani".
