= Orio Mastropiero =

Doge of Venice from 1178 to 1192

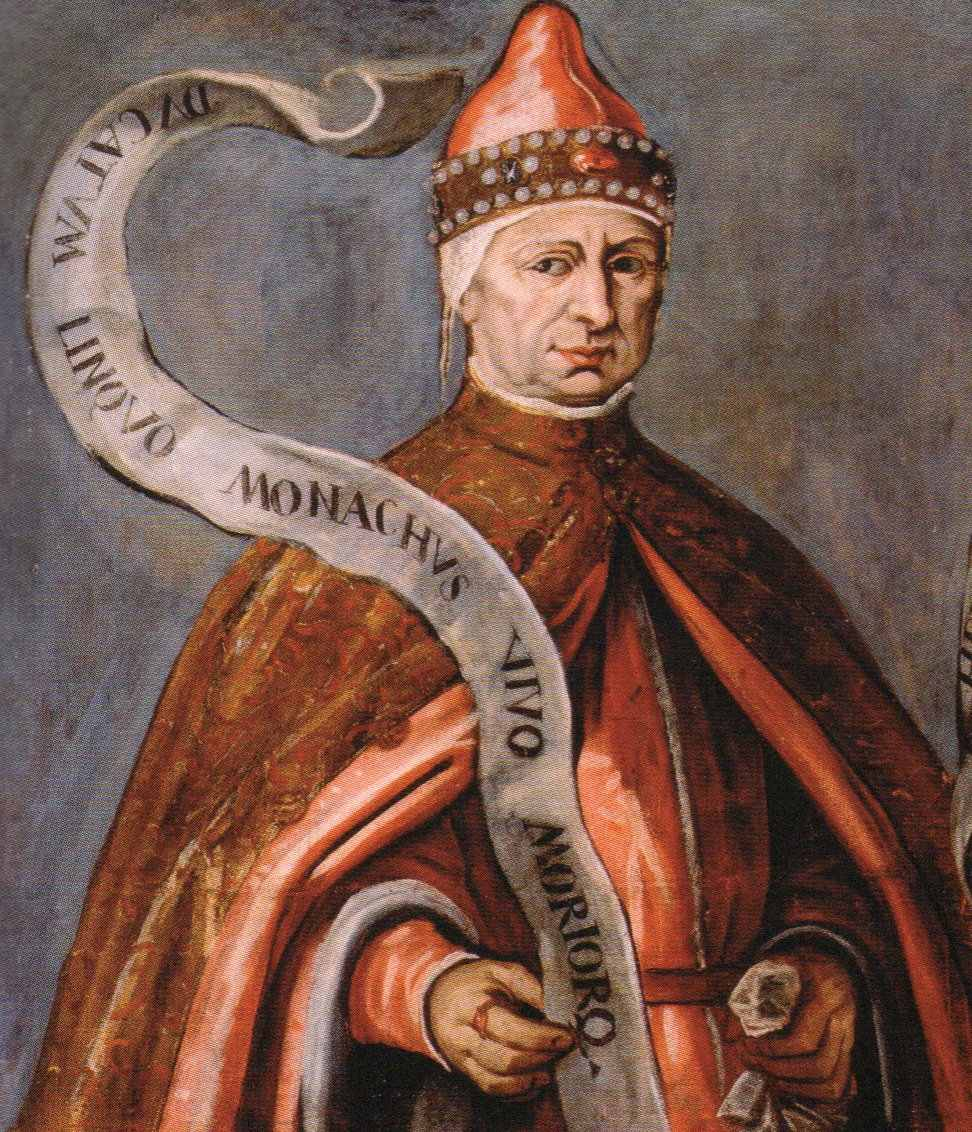
- Portrait in the Doge’s Palace

Doge of Venice
- In office 1178–1192
- Preceded by: Sebastiano Ziani
- Succeeded by: Enrico Dandolo

Personal details
- Born: Unknown
- Died: 13 June 1192

Orio Mastropiero (died 13 June 1192), forename sometimes rendered as Aurio and surname as Malipiero, was a Venetian statesman who served as the Doge of Venice from 1178 to 1192. He was elected by the Council of Forty in 1178 following the retirement of Sebastiano Ziani. Prior to this he had been an ambassador to Sicily in 1175, tasked with drawing up a treaty with King William II. He had also been the electors' first choice for doge following the death of Vitale II Michiel in 1172, but stepped aside in favour of Ziani, an older and wealthier man.

His time in office was mostly unremarkable, apart from a revolt against Venetian rule in Zara, supported by King Béla III of Hungary. For a long while Venice remained passive, being in financial difficulty, but took action at last in 1187 or 1188 when, having secured loans from the Venetian nobility, Mastropiero launched a siege against the Zaratines. This was short-lived, however, owing to an order from Pope Gregory VIII that their warring cease immediately: the Third Crusade was about to begin and Christian soldiers would be required in plenty.

In May 1192, having taken ill, Mastropiero abdicated as doge and retired to the monastery of San Croce. He died there on 13 June 1192.

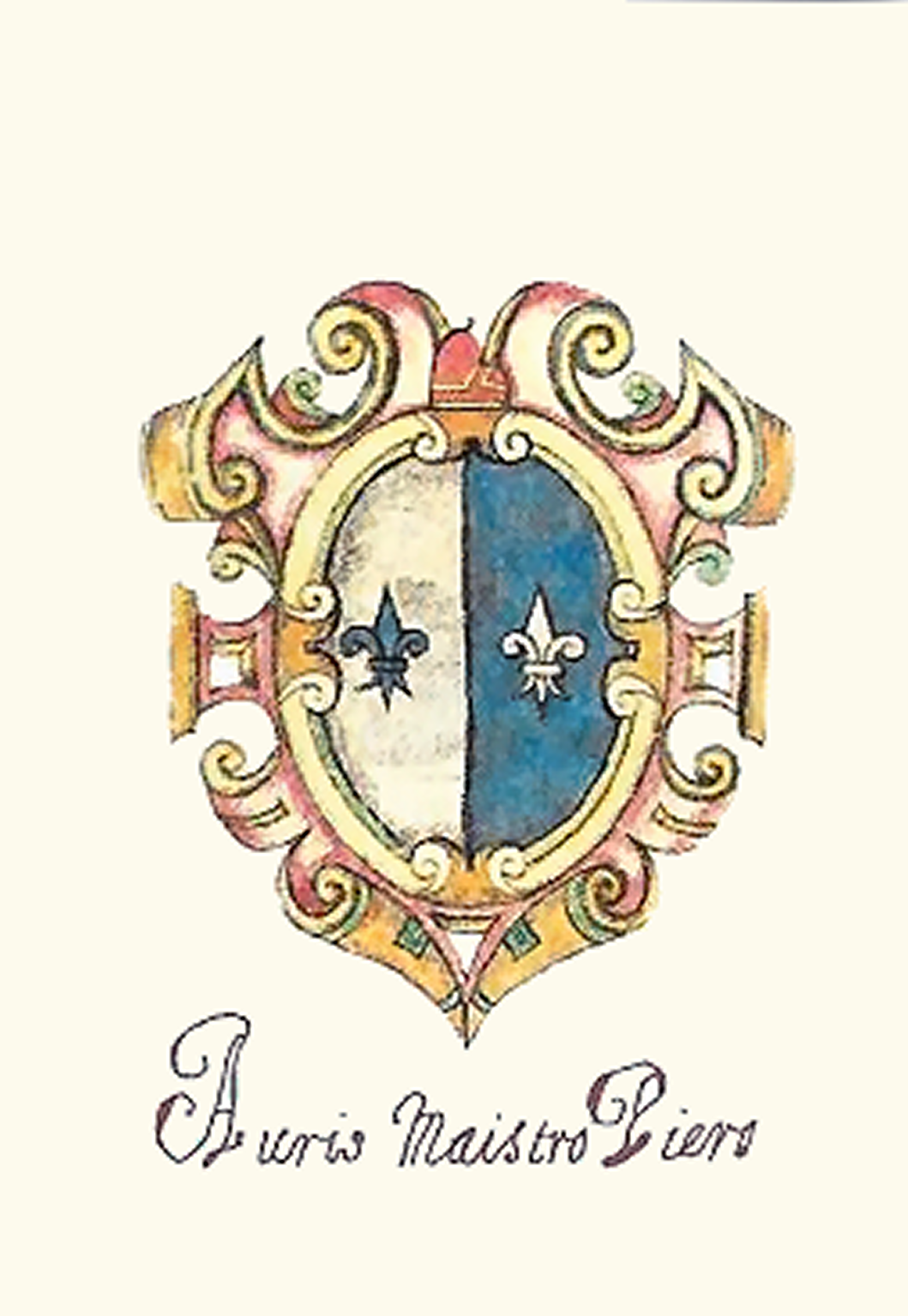
Coat of arms of Orio Mastropiero. Note how his name is given as 'Aurio' here.

== Sources ==
- Hodgson, Francis Cotterell (1901). The early history of Venice, from the foundation to the conquest of Constantinople, A.D. 1204. London: George Allen.
- Oliphant, Margaret (1887). The makers of Venice: doges, conquerors, painters, and men of letters. London: Macmillan.
- Smedley, Edward (1832). Sketches from Venetian History, Volume 1. London: John Murray.
- Queller, Donald E., & Madden, Thomas F. (1999). The Fourth Crusade: The Conquest of Constantinople. Pennsylvania: University of Pennsylvania Press.

Political offices
Preceded by Sebastiano Ziani	Doge of Venice; 1178–1192	Succeeded by Enrico Dandolo
