= Enrico Dandolo =

Doge of Venice from 1192 to 1205

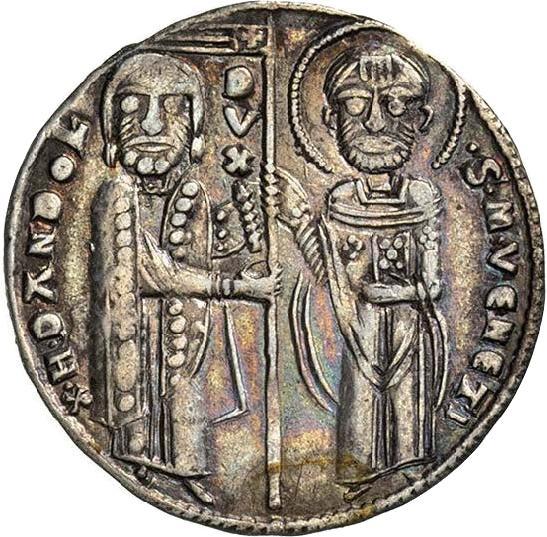
- Enrico Dandolo (left) depicted in a Venetian grosso, the currency introduced during his administration, alongside Mark the Evangelist, patron saint of the republic.

Doge of Venice
- Reign: 21 June 1192 – June 1205
- Predecessor: Orio Mastropiero
- Successor: Pietro Ziani

Despot of the Latin Empire
- Reign: 1204 – June 1205
- Emperor: Baldwin I
- Born: c. 1107; Venice, Republic of Venice (now Italy)
- Died: June 1205 (aged 97–98); Constantinople, Latin Empire (now Istanbul, Turkey)
- Burial: Hagia Sophia, Istanbul, Turkey
- Spouse: Contessa Minotto (m. 1151)
- Issue: Ranieri Dandolo
- House: Dandolo
- Father: Vitale Dandolo
- Occupation: Patrician, statesman

Enrico Dandolo (Anglicised as Henry Dandolo, and Latinised as Henricus Dandulus; c. 1107 – May/June 1205) was the doge of Venice from 1192 until his death in 1205. He is remembered for his avowed piety, remarkable longevity, and political shrewdness, particularly for his decisive role in the Fourth Crusade and the Sack of Constantinople, which effectively laid the foundations of the Venetian colonial empire. For his services, he was granted the Byzantine-derived title of Despot by the newly established Latin Empire. Dandolo died in 1205 in Constantinople and was buried at the Hagia Sophia.

== Biography ==
=== Early life and political involvement ===
Born in Venice c. 1107, Enrico Dandolo was a member of the socially and politically prominent Dandolo family. He was the son of the powerful jurist and member of the ducal court, Vitale Dandolo, and had two brothers: Andrea and Giovanni. His uncle, also named Enrico Dandolo, was patriarch of Grado.

Not much information exists on the younger Enrico before his father's death in 1174. This is because Vitale lived into his nineties and his sons were not emancipated until he died. Though Enrico was himself an elderly man at around 67, he was still under filial subjection. This was a type of partial emancipation in which he could conduct business, but because he worked for the family, most, if not all, documents used Vitale's name rather than Enrico's.

Dandolo's first important political roles took place during the crisis years of 1171 and 1172, which were a tumultuous period between the Byzantine and Venetian states. After Byzantine emperor Manuel I Comnenus restored Pisans and Genoans, both enemies of the Venetians, to their quarters in Constantinople as part of his plan to reclaim Italy, an angry Venetian mob attacked the recently reinstated Genoese quarter. This attack caused Comnenus in March 1171 to order the seizure of goods and imprisonment of thousands of Venetians living in the empire. Popular Venetian anger with the attack forced Doge Vitale II Michiel to gather a retaliatory expedition, which included Dandolo. This expedition fell apart when its participants were struck by plague in 1172, and upon his return Michiel was killed by a mob of Venetians, angry with his defeat.

The succeeding doge, Sebastiano Ziani, sought to form alliances with enemies of the Byzantine Empire so that it would feel pressured into coming to terms with Venice. He sent out multiple expeditions to Constantinople and King William II's court in Sicily, several of which Dandolo was a part, although he never met with William. Despite Dandolo's failure to meet with William II, his constant participation in these envoys shows his value and importance within the ducal court, qualities which no doubt contributed to his election as doge in 1192.

Dandolo also made trips to Constantinople in 1183 and 1184. The first voyage, on which he embarked with his brother, Giovanni, was the first in which he acted as a ducal legate. On this trip, he most likely engaged in negotiations for reparations of the city's Venetian quarter with the new Byzantine emperor Andronicus I. He also invested and restored land to Venetian monasteries, a deed which earned him the position of legal advocate for the monastery of San Cipriano di Murano.

In 1184, Dandolo, serving again as a ducal legate along with Pietro Ziani and Domenico Sanudo, returned to Constantinople to negotiate the restoration of the Venetian quarter with Andronicus. In this meeting, the emperor at last agreed to release the imprisoned Venetians, restore their quarter, and pay for reparations.

=== Dogeship ===
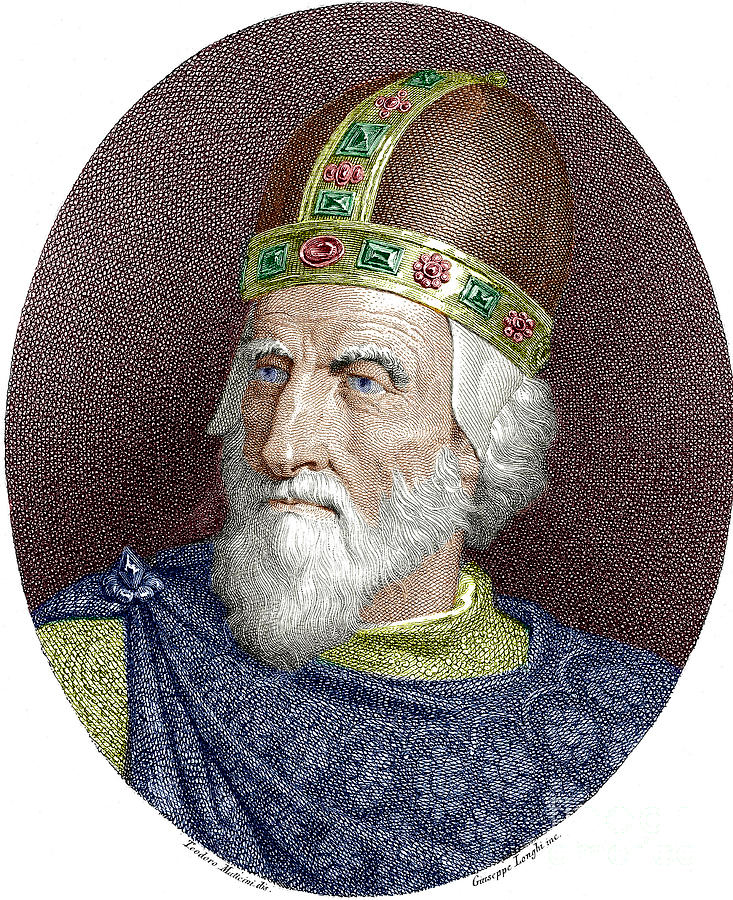
Engraving of Dandolo from the early 19th century.

On 1 June 1192, after Orio Mastropiero abdicated the throne, Dandolo became the new doge. He was the second doge to be chosen by a council of forty electors. Already aged and blind, but deeply ambitious, he displayed tremendous energy and mental capacity. His remarkable deeds over the next eleven years have led some to hypothesize that he actually may have been in his mid seventies when he became Venice's leader. None of the earlier chronicles and contemporary witnesses give his exact age, only mentioning that he was very old. The commonly given birth year of c. 1107 is based on the account of Marino Sanuto the Younger (1466 – 1536) three centuries later, who stated that Dandolo was eighty-five when he assumed the throne. Though not the first doge to take the promissione ducale, Dandolo's is the earliest that is available to historians.

One of Dandolo's first decrees as doge was to evict all foreigners who had lived in Venice for fewer than two years on 16 August 1192. Landlords were obligated to evict any of these foreigners from their premises. Citizens who violated the decree had to pay fifty lire, and foreigners' goods were confiscated. Additionally, Venetians were not allowed to lend money to foreigners—excepting those from the areas of Umana or Ragusa—for a period that exceeded fifteen days. The reason why this decree was implemented is unknown, but it seems to correlate to a recent increase of foreigners into Venice, since it did not affect foreigners who had been living in the city for more than two years.

In 1193, Dandolo commanded an attack on the nearby city of Zara, which for years had troubled Venice and threatened its control over the Dalmatian Coast. Until 1180, Zara had been under Venetian control, until they staged a successful rebellion in which they became the sole city on this coast that was against Venetian interests. Dandolo seemed to have always supported Venice's reinstating power over the city, since he had contributed money to doge Orio Mastropiero's 1187 military attempt to regain control there. Dandolo's 1193 attack on Zara was only somewhat successful. He managed to regain control over the islands of Pago, Ossero, and Arbe, which had been lost in an 1190 attempt led by Mastropiero, though not Zara.

In 1194, Dandolo enacted important reforms to the Venetian currency system. Before these reforms, Venice's principal coin was the silver penny, which weighed less than a gram and was about one-quarter fine. Due to the debasement of the silver penny in 1180 and the constant fluctuation in value of Jerusalem and Byzantine coins, Dandolo instated three denominations of this silver penny, the bianco (half-penny), the quartarolo (quarter-penny), and the silver grosso. The bianco had a silver content of about five percent, and was decorated with a cross on one side and St. Mark on the other. The quartarolo had almost no precious metal content, which made it the first European token coin since ancient Rome. The grosso was the first nearly pure silver–and high denomination–coin minted in western Europe in over five centuries. It was decorated with an image of Dandolo and St. Mark on one side, and of Jesus Christ enthroned on the other side, which imitated a design typically seen on Byzantine aspron trachy coins. The grosso eventually became the dominant coin of Mediterranean commerce.

=== Fourth Crusade ===
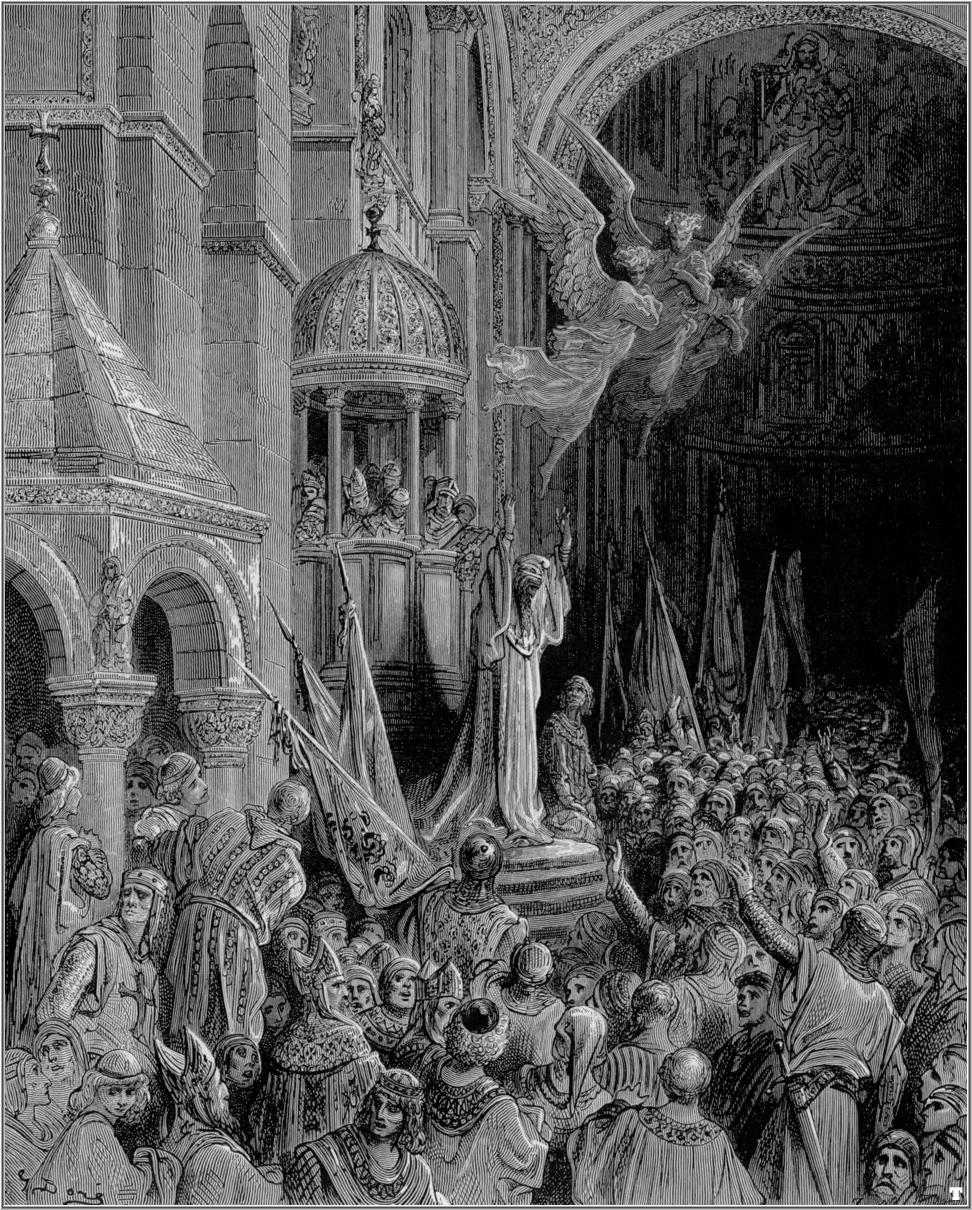
Dandolo Preaching the Crusade by Gustave Doré

In 1202, six French envoys of the Fourth Crusade arrived in Venice in hopes of acquiring a fleet and supplies. Dandolo arranged meetings for them with the ducal court, in which the council calculated the expenses necessary for this voyage, which would be the largest project in Venetian history. The terms were laid out as such: for up to a year, Venice would provide transportation and most provisions for the army. Four silver marks would be paid for each knight and horse, and two would be paid for each other member. Finally, many Venetians would also join the Crusade and promised to supply fifty fully armed galleys as long as the French promised to split the spoils with them. With the enthusiastic support of the population, Venice's participation in the Crusade was confirmed. Dandolo himself swore on holy relics to uphold every part of the agreement.

However, Venice soon faced a financial problem. The six original Crusaders had borrowed money as a down payment for the fleet, but failed to pay it back. When more Crusaders began to arrive that June, the urgency for this money increased as many Venetians, whose business relied on this reimbursement, were being driven closer to financial ruin. When the due date for payment arrived, Dandolo ordered the Crusaders, who were staying on the nearby Lido, to collectively pay 85,000 marks. Even when everyone, including many poor Crusaders, contributed all they could afford, they still owed 34,000 marks. Instead of ejecting them, Dandolo decided to lend this amount from the Venetian state, provided that it was paid back in the form of the spoils of the Crusade. In addition, Dandolo proposed that the Crusaders agree to spend the winter in Zara. This was due to the threat of Zaran pirates to Venetian commerce as well as the Venetian's interest in regaining control over the area. Additionally, staking an interest in Zara helped convince the Great Council to consent to Dandolo's plan.

The Crusade fleet left Venice during the first week of October 1202, following an emotional and rousing ceremony in San Marco di Venezia where Dandolo "took the cross" –committed himself to crusading–and promised to "go live or die" with the Crusaders in exchange for his people's support, and his sons' taking his place during his absence. The Crusaders arrived in Zara in November, the sheer size of their fleet intimidating the Zarans into near surrender. Dandolo gave the Zarans an ultimatum: either they leave the city right away or they would be killed. Confusion ensued, as Pope Innocent forbade the Crusade from settling this dispute unrelated to their original religious agenda, especially since the land was controlled by King Emeric of Hungary, who had himself taken the cross some while ago. Finally, Innocent threatened excommunication to anyone who antagonized the Zarans. The Crusaders attacked the city anyway, and it at last fell on 24 November 1202. All of the Venetian members of the Crusade were thus excommunicated (the French Crusaders had sent an envoy to the pope to ask for forgiveness), but Dandolo kept this a secret from them since he knew they would abandon the Crusade if they found out.

Shortly afterwards, Alexius Angelus, son of the deposed Byzantine emperor Isaac II, arrived in Zara, looking for help to overthrow his uncle, Alexius III, after he violently seized the throne from Isaac. Dandolo agreed to the Crusade leaders' plan to place Alexius Angelus on the throne of the Byzantine Empire in return for his support and funds to help the Crusade. The Crusaders thus took another detour to Constantinople, where the conquest and sack of Constantinople took place on 12 April 1204. During the looting, Dandolo had many items of value sent back to Venice, including the four Horses of St. Mark that decorate the Venetian cathedral to this day.

=== Latin Empire ===
When Constantinople fell, Dandolo understood that he needed to quickly restore stability to the empire to avoid disorder that could threaten Venice. One necessary task was to find an emperor for the new Latin Empire. Dandolo was offered the position, but he refused, and Baldwin of Flanders instead took the throne. Dandolo did accept, however, the title of despot.

The Partitio Romaniae also resulted from this conquest, and it awarded Venice three-eighths of the Byzantine Empire in accordance with an agreement drafted by the Crusaders before the fall of the empire. This included a part of Constantinople near the harbor, a portion of the shoreline of the Sea of Marmara, and the city of Adrianople, among other former Byzantine possessions. Dandolo was also awarded the title "lord of three-eighths of the Roman Empire", although these acquisitions only lasted until the collapse of the Latin empire in 1261.

=== Death and burial ===
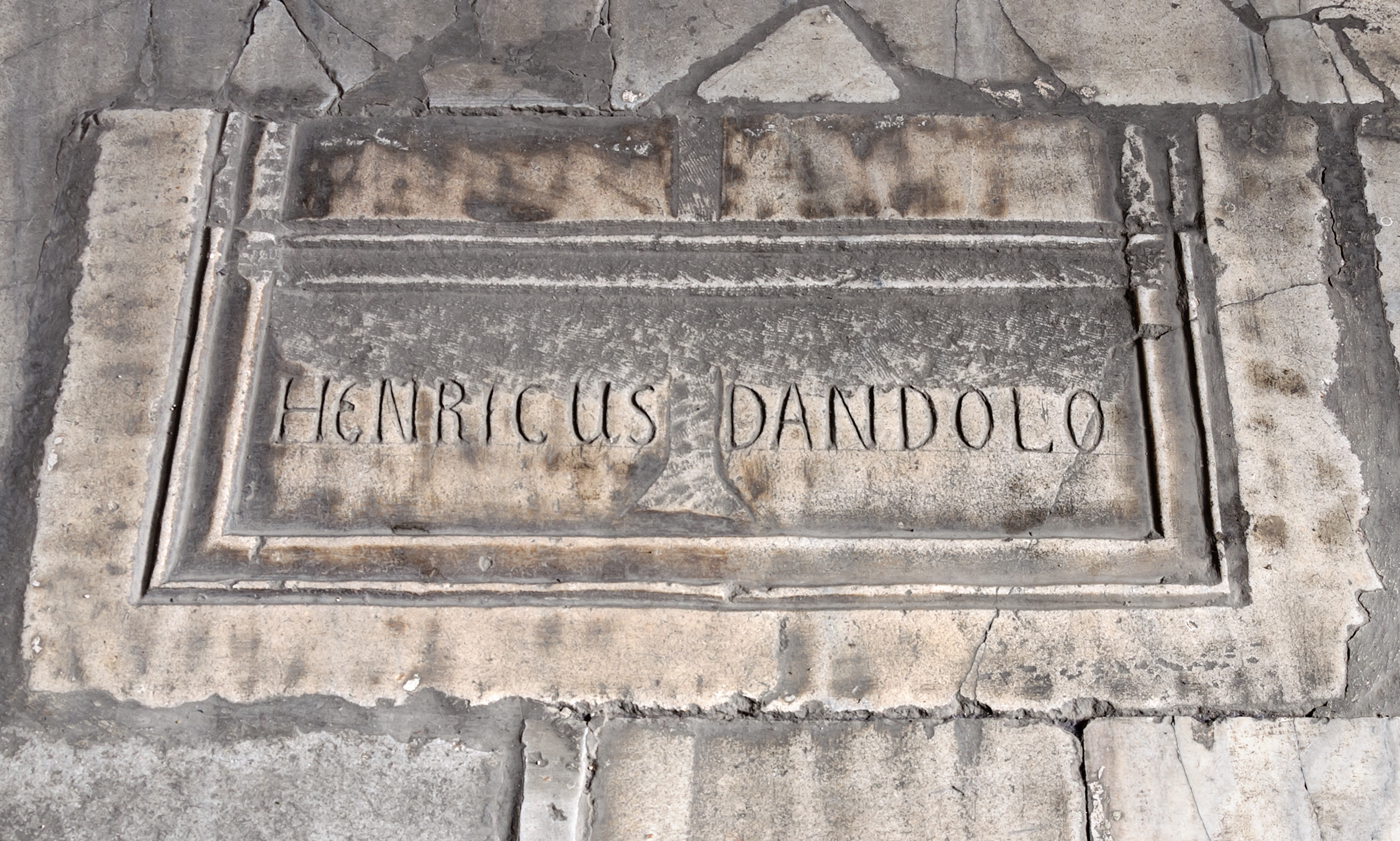
Nineteenth-century grave marker in the Hagia Sophia's East Gallery

Dandolo died in May or June 1205, reportedly from an infection in his groin caused by a hernia, and was buried in the Hagia Sophia in Constantinople. In 1261, upon retaking the city, the Byzantines desecrated the tomb to remove the remnants of their invader as Emperor Michael VIII Palaiologos ordered his remains to be thrown into the Bosporus. Other accounts suggest that after the Ottoman conquest in 1453, Sultan Mehmed II ordered the remaining Venetian tombs broken, potentially scattering what was left of his remains. In the 19th century an Italian restoration team placed a cenotaph marker near the probable location, which is still visible today. The marker is frequently mistaken by tourists as being a medieval marker of the actual tomb of the doge. The real tomb was allegedly destroyed; various legends attribute this destruction to the times of the Byzantine reconquest of the city or shortly after the Ottoman conquest of Constantinople in 1453 and subsequent conversion of Hagia Sophia into a mosque.

However, a documentary aired by Turkey's public broadcaster TRT in 2021 found evidence contrary to these legends. TRT's georadar images indicate the presence of a human skeleton whose head is approximately 50 centimeters below the cenotaph in a sitting position facing towards Jerusalem. Certain features of the skeleton, such as the height and posture, are also in line with Dandolo's.

== Blindness ==
It is not known for certain when and how Dandolo became blind. According to the Chronicle of Novgorod he had been blinded by the Byzantines during the 1171–1172 expedition to Byzantium. Supposedly, Emperor Manuel Comnenus "ordered his eyes to be blinded with glass; and his eyes were uninjured, but he saw nothing". According to Thomas F. Madden, Dandolo "was not blinded by Manuel Comnenus or, for that matter, by any Byzantine". Madden states that Dandolo had cortical blindness as a result of a severe blow to the back of the head received sometime between 1174 and 1176. Documents show Dandolo's signature being fully legible in 1174 but sprawling across the paper in 1176, suggesting that his sight deteriorated over time.

Dandolo's blindness appears to have been total. Geoffrey de Villehardouin, whom Dandolo accompanied on the Fourth Crusade, wrote that "although his eyes appeared normal, he could not see a hand in front of his face, having lost his sight after a head wound". This piece of primary evidence seems to support Madden's theory that Dandolo's blindness was cortical, since his eyes appeared to be unharmed.

== Legacy ==
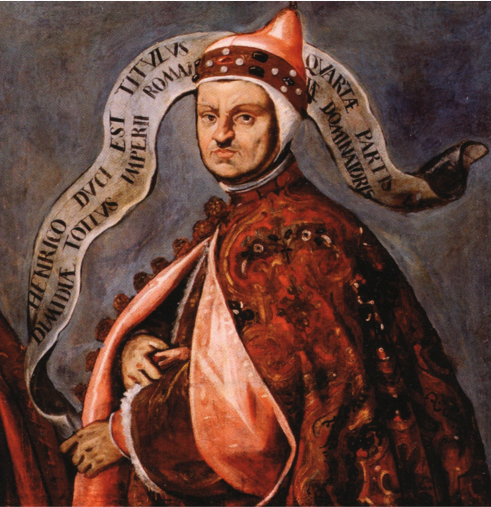
Dandolo's portrait in the Doge's Palace

Dandolo's son, Ranieri, served as vice-doge during Dandolo's absence and was later killed in the war against Genoa for the control of Crete. It is unclear if he had other children besides Ranieri as the existence of none can be confirmed by contemporary evidence. Ranieri's daughter Anna Dandolo married Serbian Grand Prince, subsequently King, Stefan Nemanjić (r. 1196–1228) in 1217, making Enrico an ancestor to much of the later Nemanjić dynasty.

During his dogeship, Dandolo was married to a woman named Contessa, to whom he delegated authority over his commercial and private affairs along with his brother, Andrea, and assumed friend Filippo Falier of the San Tomà parish, before he departed on a political trip to Constantinople with his brother, Giovanni, in 1183. Contessa's identity is debated, and it is often thought that she may have been a member of the Minotto clan though the veracity of this claim is inconclusive.

In the nineteenth-century, the Regia Marina (Italian Navy) launched an ironclad battleship named Enrico Dandolo.

Enrico Dandolo and his role in the conquest of Constantinople were referenced by Lord Byron in his poem Childe Harold's Pilgrimage:

Oh, for one hour of blind old Dandolo! Th' octogenarian chief, Byzantium's conquering foe.

Dandolo is depicted in the posthumous series of official portraits of the doges of Venice in the Doge's Palace. The original gallery was established in the 1360s under doge Marco Cornaro as a chronological sequence of Venetian rulers, each shown holding a scroll inscribed with a summary of his achievements. After the original paintings were destroyed in the fire of 1577, the series was recreated, with Domenico Tintoretto executing most of the surviving portraits. The scroll held by Dandolo contains the following inscription in latin:

HENRICO DUCI EST TITULUS QUARTÆ PARTIS ET DIMIDIÆ, TOTIUS IMPERII ROMANIÆ DOMINATORIS

[Enrico the Doge held the title of Lord of the fourth part and a half of the entire Empire of Romania.]

== Popular culture ==
- Doge Enrico Dandolo leads the civilization of Venice in the popular turn-based strategy video game Civilization V's second expansion pack Brave New World.
- Dandolo is mentioned briefly in Dan Brown's book, Inferno, by main character Robert Langdon in connection with his final resting place — the Hagia Sophia. The novel was also adapted into a film by the same name in 2016, featuring Tom Hanks and Felicity Jones.

== Bibliography ==
- Crowley, Roger (2011). City of Fortune - How Venice Won and lost a Naval Empire (Hardback). London: Faber and Faber. ISBN 978-0-571-24594-9.
- Gallo, Rudolfo (1927). "La tomba di Enrico Dandolo in Santa Sofia a Constantinople". Rivista mensile della Citta di Venezia 6.
- Jones, Dan (2019). Crusaders: An Epic History of the Wars for the Holy Lands. Head of Zeus. ISBN 9781781858899.
- Kittell, Ellen E.; Madden, Thomas F. (1999). Medieval and Renaissance Venice. Urbana: University of Illinois Press.
- Madden, Thomas F. (1993). "Venice and Constantinople in 1171 and 1172: Enrico Dandolo's Attitude towards Byzantium". Mediterranean Historical Review. 8 (2): 166–185. doi:10.1080/09518969308569655.
- Madden, Thomas F. (2003). Enrico Dandolo and the Rise of Venice. Baltimore: Johns Hopkins University Press. ISBN 0-8018-7317-7.
- Madden, Thomas F. (2012). Venice: A New History. New York: Viking Press. ISBN 9781470327682.
- Madden, Thomas F. (1999) "Venice's Hostage Crisis: Diplomatic Efforts to Secure Peace with Byzantium between 1171 and 1184." In Medieval and Renaissance Venice, edited by Ellen E. Kittell and Thomas F. Madden. Urbana: University of Illinois Press.
- Okey, Thomas (1910). Venice and its Story. London: J.M. Dent and Sons, Ltd.
- Robbert, Louise Buenger (1974). "Reorganization of the Venetian Coinage by Doge Enrico Dandolo". Speculum. 49 (1): 48–60. doi:10.2307/2856551. JSTOR 2856551. S2CID 162673743.
- Savignac, David. "The Medieval Russian Account of the Fourth Crusade - A New Annotated Translation".
- Stahl, Alan M. (1999). "The Coinage of Venice in the Age of Enrico Dandolo." In Medieval and Renaissance Venice, edited by Ellen E. Kittell and Thomas F. Madden. Urbana: University of Illinois
- Stahl, Alan M (2000). Zecca the mint of Venice in the Middle Ages. American Numismatic Society.; NetLibrary, Inc. ISBN 0-8018-7694-X. 9780801876943.
- Van Tricht, Filip (2011). The Latin Renovatio of Byzantium: The Empire of Constantinople (1204-1228). Translated by Longbottom, Peter. Brill.

Political offices
Preceded by Orio Mastropiero	Doge of Venice; 1192–1205	Succeeded by Pietro Ziani
