= Byzantine–Venetian war (1171-1172) =

1171 war

Byzantine–Venetian War of 1171
Date	1171–1172
Location	Aegean Sea
Result	Byzantine victory

Belligerents
Republic of Venice	Byzantine Empire

Commanders and leaders
Doge Michiel †; Enrico Dandolo; Filippo Greco	Manuel I Andronikos Kontostephanos

Strength
100 Galleys; 20 Transports	150 ships

Casualties and losses
Most of the fleet	

The Byzantine–Venetian War of 1171 was fought between the Byzantine Empire and the Republic of Venice as a result of the Byzantine imprisonment of Venetian merchants and citizens across the Empire. 10,000 Venetians were imprisoned in the Byzantine capital, Constantinople, alone. Despite Doge Michiel's apparent will to pursue a peaceful solution, outrage in Venice itself swung popular opinion in the favour of full scale war against Byzantium. Doge Michiel had no choice but to set out for war, which he did in mid-late 1171.

== Background ==
Although trade was very important for the Byzantine economy, political relations with Italian merchants soured at times. Local merchants also resented the Italian merchants advantageous terms of trade. Tensions rose in 1171; Manuel I ordered attacks on Venetian merchants, property and ships.

== Course of the War ==
On the 21st of March, 1171, Manuel I orders the arrest of all Venetians residing in Byzantion (Constantinople), resulting in more than 10,000 arrests and the re-registration of their property to the state treasury.

== Aftermath ==
The disastrous defeat of Venice in this war was one of the greatest military blunders in the city-state's history, and permanently altered Venice's position on foreign affairs. A formal truce between the two empires would not be ratified until 1177, with minor skirmishes continuing until then.

== Sources ==
- Herrin, Judith (2007). Byzantium: The Surprising Life of a Medieval Empire. Great Britain: Penguin Group. ISBN 978-0691143699.
- Madden, Thomas (2012). Venice: A New History. United States: Penguin Group. ISBN 978-0147509802.

== See also ==
- Byzantine–Venetian War (1296–1302)
- Venetian–Genoese wars
