= Ammiana =

Former settlement in the Venetian Lagoon, Italy

Coordinates: 45°31′N 12°27′E

Ammiana was a settlement in an archipelago in the northern part of the Lagoon of Venice which has disappeared. Its islands were part of a larger number of islands in this part of the lagoon which also included the island group of the next-door settlement of Costanziaco (just to the east) and the islands of Torcello, Burano and Mazzorbo to the south-east. The islands of Ammiana were between the right and left banks of the lagunar channels which today are called della Dolce and San Felice. Another island, which was called tumba della Leseda and is now called La Salina, which lies on the right (eastern) bank of the San Felice channel, was also part of this settlement.

Like other settlements on islands of this part of this lagoon, it flourished between the 7th and 13th century but declined in the 13th century due to deteriorating environmental conditions and was abandoned by the mid-14th century. Like the next door Costanziaco, some of its islands were subsequently submerged by the waters of the lagoon.

The archipelago comprised the islands of Ammianella (which had the Santi Andrea e Giacomo monastery), Castrazio (which had the San Lorenzo church and monastery), Orti di Ammiana (which had the monasteries of Santi Filippo e Giacomo Apostoli, S. Marco, which was later renamed Santa Cristina, and the church and monastery of Sant’Angelo) and other islands which in the Middle Ages were called tumbae: tumba Ambrosii, tumba della Gaiada (which had the church and monastery of Santa Maria Maddalena della Gaiada) and tumba Leseda (which had the monastery of Santi Felice e Fortunato).

Hardly anything is known about the life and politics of this settlement. There is only information form archival documents held in the island of Torcello, which at the time was the chief administrative centre of this part of the Lagoon of Venice. These are legal documents regarding transactions, such as sales and purchases of property, bequests and disputes. The documents have provided information about the churches and monasteries of these islands and their locations.

== Early historical record ==
The earliest information about the area and the settlement comes from the Pactum Lotharii of 840, an agreement of the emperor Lothair I with the peoples of the lagoons on the coast of north-western Italy. The pact confirmed its inhabitants’ right to graze their animals in the Treviso area, on the mainland. It cites Torcello, Ammiana and Burano in this order but does not mention the nearby Costanziaco. This arrangement was renewed in 907 by the emperor Otto I. It mentions the same settlements in the same order. In 900 the monastery of Santo Stefano in Altinum (near the closest mainland shore of the lagoon) moved to Ammiana, assumed the name of Santi Felice e Fortunato and owned the churches of S. Giustina in Lido delle Vignole (on the Vignole island) and of S. Felice di Dozza (a village near Bologna).

The Chronicon Venetum et Gradense a chronicle which was written in the mid-10th/early 11th century, reports the foundation of churches and monasteries in this area. According to this, the Frauduni. Willareni and Mastalici families initially built the church of San Lorenzo. Later these families built a bridge called San Lorenzo and a castle. This was attested in a 1152 document. The families then moved to Ammiana. Later the use of marshes and fish farms and the construction of mills were granted. The families also built the church of San Marco and put it under the jurisdiction of the monastery of San Lorenzo. Shortly afterwards they built the church of Santi Sergio e Bacco and the church of Santi Marcelliano e Massimo in Costanziaco. These became the parish churches of Costanziaco.

The first direct source of information about Ammiana was the will of the doge Pietro Ziani (1205–1229) written in 1228 which provided first exhaustive list of monasteries. The listed monasteries in Ammiana were San Felice, San Lorenzo, Sant’Andrea, Sant’Angelo, San Marco, Sant’Adriano di Ammiana (even though this was actually in Costanziaco), Santi Apostoli and Santa Maria della Galada. For Costanziaco only San Giovanni was mentioned.

== Islands, churches and monasteries ==
=== Ammianella or Sant’Andrea di Ammiana and the Sant'Andrea church and monastery ===
This was the northernmost island of the archipelago. It was just to the north of Orti di Ammiana. The first attestation of the Sant’Adrea church was a 1152 document which said that it was close to Orti di Ammiana and the San Lorenzo bridge. It was subordinate to the San Lorenzo monastery as attested by a 1180 document which recorded its donation to this monastery. The Cenobitic monastery of Sant'Andrea e Giacomo was built next to it. Following the establishment of this monastery, the island was renamed Sant'Andrea di Ammiana. In the early 15th century the monastery was in distress and a 1455 document reported the intention of using the church to obtain building materials to be taken to Venice to use them for the Saint Mark's Basilica in Venice.

=== Orti di Ammiana ===
This island was sometimes referred to as Ammiana. However, its full name was Orti di Ammiana (Vegetable Gardens of Ammiana). It was the largest and most important island of the archipelago. It had the following monasteries:

- Sant’Angelo church and monastery - The Sant’Angelo church was granted, with the consent of the San Lorenzo monastery, to two nuns. They built the Sant’Angelo monastery which received a donation in the will of the doge Pietro Ziani (1205–1229) in 1228. From a document of the public property authority of the Republic of Venice regarding the tumba Ambrosii (see below) it can be assumed that this church was not far from the monastery of Santa Maria in Gaiada on the tumba Gaiada (see below). It stated that "one of [the tumba Ambrosii's] sides faced Ammiana and that on this side, Ammiana strengthened the part of the bank of the branch of Gaiada ... as far as the corner of the wall of Sant’Angelo and only in the part of the wall by Orti di Ammiana." The term branch of the Gaiada must have referred to a channel which separated Orti di Ammiana and the tumba Gaiada. In 1438 Pope Eugene IV seconded the nuns to the monastery of Sant’Eufemia in Mazzorbo.
- San Marco/Santa Cristina monastery - Originally this monastery was called San Marco. It was built around the 7th century by the Falier family. It was run by Benedictine nuns. In 1325 the body of Santa Cristina was smuggled from Constantinople to this monastery, which came to be called San Cristina. In official documents it was indicated as Sancti Marci de Aymanis in quarum loco est corpus Sancte Cristine (Saint Mark of Ammiana where the body of Saint Christine is).

The monastery of San Marco was mentioned in the Chronicon Venetum et Gradense (see above), which stated that it was subordinate to the monastery of San Lorenzo. By virtue of this relationship, in 1229 this monastery represented San Lorenzo in a dispute over a plot of land and a vineyard in the nearby Lio Piccolo which involved the latter monastery and in which there was the mediation of a papal envoy. In 1332 the abbess and the nuns were granted financial help for the repair of the monastery, its foundations and its lodgings. This indicated that the area was undergoing significant environmental degradation. Two years later, in 1334, the nuns were granted 40 soldos for the repair of the foundations of the cloisters and the refectory. In 1340 the nuns moved to the monastery of Santa Maria degli Angeli on the Murano island, but the senate of the Republic of Venice ordered them to return to Ammiana. In 1343 the archive of the Republic of Venice recorded that the nuns suffered hardship and poverty and could not sustain the church and its buildings. They were granted 10 soldos.

In 1432 the environmental conditions had become so prohibitive that the last few nuns who had remained in the monastery were incorporated into the monastery of Sant’Antonio in Torcello. The nuns stopped paying the parish church of San Salvador for land they used in Lio Piccolo. The body of Santa Cristina was moved to Torcello, too. It was later moved to the Santa Giustina church in Venice. This church was closed down by Napoleon when he conquered Venice. The body was moved to the San Francesco del Deserto island in 1810. Now it is in an urn in the Priuli chapel of the church of St Francis.

- Santi Apostoli Filippo e Giacomo monastery -This monastery is mentioned in the article by Busato, Rosso and Sfameni and is indicated in a photo it provides. However, it does not give any information about this monastery. It provides a quotation form a 1343 document which is placed under the section about San Marco. This document referred to the abbattisse et monialibus Sanctorum Apostolorum de Aymanis, the abbess and nuns of Saints Apostles of Ammiana. It said that they were in great distress and poverty and were not able to repair the monastery and its buildings, which were under continuous treat of going to ruin. They were granted 10 soldos.

=== Castrazio and the San Lorenzo monastery ===
This island was in the centre of the archipelago, to the southeast of Orti di Ammiana, from which it was probably separated by the San Lorenzo channel, to the west to tumba Leseda, from which it was separated by the San Felice channel, and to the north of tumba della Gaiada, which was probably further south along the San Lorenzo channel.

San Lorenzo monastery - This was the top monastic institution in the area. The monasteries of Sant’Angelo, San Marco/Santa Cristina and Santi Apostoli Filippo, in Orti di Ammiana, and Sant’ Andrea in Ammianella were subordinate to it. So were the two parish churches of the next-door settlement of Costanziaco: Santi Massimo e Marcelliano and Santi Sergio e Bacco. The importance of this monastery led to a number of legal disputes with the monastery of Santi Felice e Fortunato on the next door tumba Leseda island. In 1428 Pope Eugenius IV gave his consent to join the nuns of this monastery to the monastery of Santa Maria degli Angeli in Murano.

San Lorenzo parish church - Lanfranchi gives 1038 as the date of the first documentary attestation of the church. However, the source he used is dubious. The first attestation of this church having a parish jurisdiction was in 1131. In the past archaeologists identified elements of this church, which was older than the San Lorenzo monastery, in the structure of the complex of this monastery and attributed its origin to the Early Middle Ages on the basis of a marble capital and decorative stylistic features which are compatible with 9th century epigraphic characters. However, the opinion has changed and the possibility of an Early Middle Age origin had been ruled out because it seems that after the end of the Late antiquity period (6th century) the island was settled only on and off and because there is a total absence of finds of pottery used as transport containers after the late 7th/early 8th century, which suggests an absence or very low levels of human activity.

This island has been extensively excavated archaeologically. Ernesto Canal, who conducted explorations between the late 1960s and the late 1980s, interpreted the find of the foundations of a thick wall as belonging to a Byzantine castle (castrum in Latin) and that of a square structure as being the foundation of its tower. Because of this, Busato, Rosso and Sfameni suggest that the name Castrazio was derived from castrum. However, this notion has been disputed.

The Byzantine castle hypothesis was based on the fact that the Byzantine emperor Constantine VII Porphyrogennetos (reigned 908-913) mentioned that there was a series of κάστρov in the lagoon. This Greek word was translated as castrum. However, a number of scholars have found this perplexing. Von Falkenhausen and Lazzari have argued that this was a mistranslation and that the word can be interpreted as meaning towns. Moreover, the square structure which was presumed to be the foundation of the Byzantine tower was not found in subsequent archaeological research.

Archaeologists have found traces of settlement on the island dating to the 2nd century BC. At one point the island seems to have been partially submerged by rising sea levels and have undergone an ecosystem change from freshwater to brackish water. In the 4th and 5th century the ground level was raised and the island was resettled but it was submerged again. Settlement resumed in the 6th century after land reclamations. The island was used as a cemetery for some fifty years between the late 6th century and the early 7th century. After further land reclamation in the mid-7th century there was a resumption of permanent settlement.

=== Tumbae between Ammiana and Costanziaco ===
Documents in the 12th and 13th centuries mentioned a series tumbae (sing. tumba) between Ammiana and Costanziaco, on the Costanziaco channel (which was between these two settlements). This must have been the channel which today is called della Dolce. The term tumba appeared in Medieval documents and is no longer in use. Its exact meaning is not known. It referred to island formations. Among them there were the tumba Ambrosii, and the tumba Gaiada, at the western and southern ends of the archipelago respectively. They were mentioned in a 1174 document as being between Ammiana and Costanziaco on the Costanziaco channel and by the Castrazio island respectively. The tumba Gaiada had the church of Santa Maria della Gaiada. At the eastern end of the archipelago and by a channel which is today called San Felice channel there was the tumba Leseda. The Benedictine monks build the monastery of SS. Felice e Fortunato here.

=== The Tumba della Gaiada and the church and monastery of Santa Maria Maddalena della Gaiada ===
Gaiada was also spelt Galiada and Galliada in historical documents. It was the southernmost part of the archipelago, to the south of the Castrazio island, in the Plaude della Centrega marsh and probably further south along the San Lorenzo channel. The first attestation of the Galliada toponym is a 1174 verdict by the public property authority of the Republic of Venice which mentions the tumba Ambrosii” and “Galliada in an area between Torcello and Falconera (a location that has not been identified). According to Corner, an 18th-century church historian, the first document which mentioned the church of Santa Maria Maddalena was in 1025 but secure documentation started only in 1155. There was already a parish church dedicated to the same saint in the Cannaregio district of Venice which, according to the chronicles, was founded in 1025. A document of a bequest in 1231 mentioned the monastery. The cult of Santa Maria Maddalena started in Provence (southern France) and spread to Northern Italy. It was linked to protection against mouth illnesses.

The monastery of Santa Maria Maddalena (or Santa Maria della Gaiada) received donation in wills of the second half of the 13th century. In 1252 pope Innocent IV intervened in a dispute between this monastery and that of San Lorenzo. In 1271 a private donation was distributed to the monasteries of Sant’Andrea and San Marco, in Orti di Ammiana, San Lorenzo, in Castrazio, two monasteries in Torcello and lastly Sant’Angelo (also in Orti di Ammiana) and Santa Maria Maddalena. In 1276 a contract between the abbess of Santa Margherita in Torcello and the prioress of Santa Maria della Gaiada was signed for the rental of a property for five years by the former. One proviso was that the abbess would find a farmer to work the land of its property and that she would rent it to this person. That this island was cultivable was also confirmed by the fact that people from outside the lagoon resided in the island and worked the fields belonging to Santa Maria. In 1280 there was one of various disputes with the monastery of Santi Felice e Fortunato. There were also disputes with the parish church of San Lorenzo and that of the nearby Littore Albo (today’s Lio Piccolo by the Cavallino peninsula).

In 1338 the prior of Santa Maria received a donation by a man who wanted to be buried in the church of Santa Maria. The building, which was over one hundred years old, needed repair and received a grant for this from Venice in 1371. However, in 1415 the island had already been abandoned and the senate of the Republic of Venice allowed the bishop of Torcello to level out the properties owned by the monastery, which was now empty, to repair the church and monastery and to better maintain the shore. In 1432 the revenues of this monastery were incorporated into the Santa Caterina monastery in Mazzorbo.

=== Tumba Leseda and the Santi Felice e Fortunato monastery ===
This island was at the eastern end of the archipelago. It was separated from Castrazio, and probably also Orti di Ammiana, by the channel which today is called San Felice. The monastery of Santo Stefano in Altinum moved to this island and established the Santi Felice e Fortunato monastery. In 900 it owned the churches of Santa Giustina nel Lido delle Vignole on the Vignole island and San Felice di Dozza (a village near Bologna). Archival documentation about this monastery is abundant, The earliest document dates to 1074. It was mentioned as Sancti Felicis de Ammiana in a will in which it received a private donation in 1123. It was one of the wealthiest and most prestigious monasteries in this part of the lagoon. The doge Orso II Participazio (912–32) withdrew to this monastery, where he soon died and was buried there. His son Pietro Participazio (doge 939–942) was buried in his father’s sepulchre in 942. In the 12th century it received substantial land donations, especially in the nearby Littore Albo (today’s Lio Piccolo by the Cavallino peninsula).

In the late 13th century, after a long dispute with the San Lorenzo monastery regarding a vineyard in Lio Piccolo, pope Gregory X (1271–76) closed down San Felice due to bad management. The abbot and four monks were transferred to the Santi Filippo e Giacomo convent in Venice and the properties and revenues of the monastery came in the hands of two noble families. Unhappy with this, the Vatican reopened the monastery and kept in going for two more centuries. In 1419 the bishop of Torcello tried to somehow to revive the settlement which had been abandoned by its inhabitants and the last abbot due to adverse environmental conditions. The monks had moved to Venice. In 1455 it was decreed that the marbles of the monastery were to be used for the St. Mark's basilica in Venice. In 1472, on the request of the doge Nicolò Tron (1471–1473), Pope Sixtus IV abolished this monastery together with the one with the same name in Venice. By 1455 the ruined bell tower was all that remained of the monastery. It remained there for several centuries.

== Environmental degradation ==
The northern part of the Lagoon of Venice underwent a process of environmental degradation which led to the abandonment of the islands of Ammiana, those of the next-door settlement of Costanziaco and the island of Torcello.

In late 12th century there was marine regression which the modified the geographical configuration of this part of the lagoon. In this period the monastery of Sant’Adriano was founded in Costanziaco (1160) and the churches Sant’Andrea in Ammiana and San Matteo in Costanziaco were turned into monasteries in 1180 and 1229 respectively. The establishment of monastic communities was perhaps an attempt to repopulate these islands as many families moved to the nascent Venice which offered better economic opportunities. (The settlement which was to become the city of Venice developed later than the other settlements on the islands of the lagoon.)

In the 13th century the River Sile silted. The mouth of this river is to the northeast of Ammiana and to the north of the island group of Costanziaco. The river continues to flow through the lagoon until it reaches the sea at Treporti, forming a lagunar channel whose tracts are nowadays called della Dossa channel, La Cura Channel, channel of Sant’Antonio and Channel of Burano. The La Cura tract flowed in the middle of the islands of Costanziaco, just east of Ammiana, and the Sant’Antonio tract skirted the south of the Torcello island, to its southeast.

The silting caused by the Sile, combined with a lack of inflow of sea currents, turned the northern part of the lagoon into a marshy area with freshwater reedbeds and brackish water saltmarshes. This led to problems with malaria. This silting also caused a rise in water levels and through this, flooding in the fields on the islands, which led to a loss in their use for cultivation, except for rented out plots which were properties of monasteries. Higher water levels and floods also eroded the islands’ embankments which at the time were made of wood and the latter also damaged the buildings, which were also wooden.

In Orti di Ammiana the monastery of Santa Cristina was given funds for major repairs in 1332 and 1343 and the Santi Apostoli Filippo e Giacomo was also given funds for the same purpose in 1343. The monastery of Santa Maria Maddalena in the Tumba Gaiada was also given a grant for repairs in 1371.

The churches in Costanziaco, which was along the channel formed by the Sile was adversely affected earlier. The San Pietro church and the Santi Sergio e Bacco parish church (founded in the 11th c.) were given to the Sant’Adriano monastery in 1271. The other parish church, Santi Massimo e Marcelliano (11th c.) was already abandoned in 1279. San Matteo (1229) was abandoned in 1298, San Mauro (12th c.) in the 13th c. Santi Giovanni e Paolo (1228) lasted until 1400. The monastery of Sant’Adriano (1160) was abandoned in 1526, outlasting the churches and monasteries of Ammiana. This was probably because the island it was on, Sant’Ariano, had more elevated ground than all the other nearby islands. Lio Piccolo was also affected. Its church of San Salvador (1183) was abandoned in 1301.

In the island group of Ammiana, Sant’Apostoli Filippo e Giacomo (Orti di Ammiana, founded in 1185) was abandoned in 1387, San Felice e Fortunato (Tumba Leseda, 1074) in 1419, Santa Maria de Galiada (Tumba Gaiada, 1231) in 1415, San Marco/Santa Cristina (Orti di Ammiana, 1185) in 1432, San Lorenzo (Castrazio, 10th c.) in 1438, Sant’Angelo (Orti di Ammiana, 1195) in 1438, Santi Andrea e Giacomo (Ammianella, 1152) in 1455.

== Disappeared islands ==
Sometime after the abandonment of Ammiana and Constanziaco, some of their islands were submerged by the waters of the lagoon and have disappeared. Other were partially submerged and only remnants are still above water. There is no historical record of this event and its timing is unknown. Its causes are uncertain. It is known that over the centuries the water level of the lagoon fluctuated due to a combination of marine ingression or regression and subsidence. In Ammiana the tumba Ambrosii and the tumba della Gaiada were permanently submerged and no longer exist. Today's Motta dei cunnici and La Salina islands are thought to be island remnants. The Motta di San Lorenzo and the Santa Cristina island might also be remnants.

== The surviving islands ==
- Motta dei cunicci - In Venetian dialect motta denotes a small piece of land that just about emerges from the water; that is, a small islet. In the same dialect cunicci means rabbits. It receives this name from the fact that it is populated by rabbits. It is the smallest surviving fragment of the archipelago. This small patch of land indicates a part of the area where there was an inhabited centre. It lies just north of the Santa Cristina island. It is likely that the church of San Pietro di Casacalba was in these environs.
- Motta di S. Lorenzo - It is a small island which is lies in shallow waters, just a few inches above the water level and can be easily confused with the surrounding berene (saltmarshes) and velme (mudflats). It does not have any trees and is covered with the vegetation of the saltmarshes. It terrain is altered by periodic submersions. It can only reached with small boats. It is the second smallest island of the archipelago. It lies to the southeast of the Santa Cristina island and to the west and in line with the La Salina island. It was the island of Castrazio, which had the parish church and the monastery of San Lorenzo and might be a remnant. Despite the small size of the motta, as mentioned above, it has been the subject of several archaeological excavations. These have brought to light remains of medieval foundations and floors which confirm that an important settlement was present in very remote times.
- La 'Salina - It is in the easternmost part of the Ammiana Archipelago. It is what remains of the tumba Leseda in its south-eastern corner. The church and monastery of Santi Felice e Fortunato were here. These religious buildings were still indicated in 16th-century maps. In 1854, this island remnant, which at the time was called Motta di San Felice, was chosen as the headquarters for a large saltworks development in the adjacent Palude Maggiore marsh. Because of this, the island became known as La Salina (The Saltworks). The saltworks were completed in 1857. Salt production ceased in 1913. It was the last saltworks in the Lagoon of Venice. Some families moved in to fish and to set up vegetable gardens. A large building with a courtyard was indicated in a map of the 1932 land registry. It probably belonged to the former saltworks and was in disuse. The surviving ruins seem to be angular towers that belonged to that structure. Between 1978 and 1998 the last families of farmers and fishermen left the island. The island is now private property of the Le Garzette agritourism firm. Its low-lying areas are often submerged by high tides and are covered by saltmarsh vegetation.
- Santa Cristina - This used to be the Orti di Ammiana island. It had the monasteries of San Marco of Santa Cristina, Santi Apostoli Filippo e Giacomo and Sant’ Angelo. Erosion became so bad that by the mid-15th century there were just empty buildings. The nuns of San Marco/Santa Cristina moved to the island of Burano 1340 but they were ordered to go back. In 1432 they were allowed to move to the island of Torcello. They took the body of Santa Cristina with them. Despite Venice’s attempt to protect the island, it was eventually swallowed by the lagoon's water. In a 1770 map its outline was already very similar to that of recent times and there was a marsh in place of a former fishing farm. There was a building in the place where recently there was a casone (a traditional lagoon cabin for fishermen or farmers).

Santa Cristina was bought by Gernot Langes-Swarovski in 1982. His stepson René Deutsch, and his wife Sandra have spent half a million euros to regenerate the island and develop a self-sufficient, environmentally-conscious and sustainable organic fruit and vegetable growing and fish farming business. It also has a luxury eco-retreat guesthouse with nine bedrooms, a yoga room, a patio, a swimming pool and three gazebos. It has a 30-hectare orchard with apricot and plum trees and grape vines. From the latter 10,000 bottles of Cabernet Sauvignon and Merlot wine are produced for private use and for guests. Some select wines are sold to the top local restaurants. There is a vegetable garden which is being expanded with the aim of growing fresh produce in all seasons. There is also a beehive for saltmarsh honey production. Drinking water is drawn with 240 m deep wells which use the latest technology. The island had a fish farm which was not used for two decades. It is being redeveloped in collaboration with the Ca’ Foscari University in Venice. The University has found some species of crustaceans that survived on the island and do not exist anywhere else in the lagoon.
