= Mazzorbo =

Island in the Venice lagoon

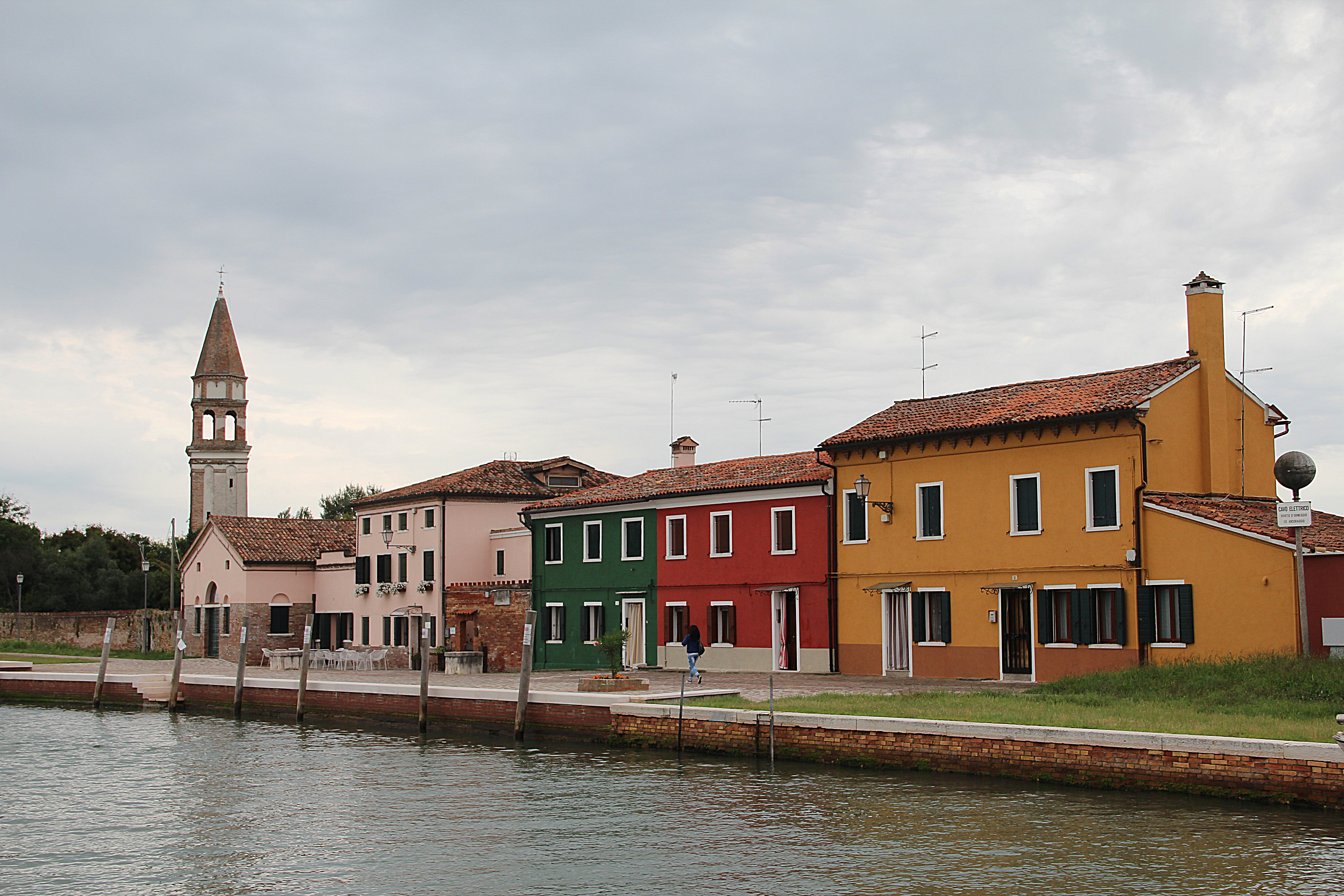
- Colourful houses in Mazzorbo, similar to those in Burano

- Location within Venetian Lagoon

Geography
- Coordinates: 45.486944°N 12.409167°E
- Adjacent to: Venetian Lagoon

Administration
- Italy
- Region: Veneto
- Province: Province of Venice

Mazzorbo is one of various islands in the northern part of the Lagoon of Venice. Like the other islands in this part of the lagoon, it was the site of one of the earliest settlements in the lagoon which predated the development of Venice. However, these islands then declined and were eventually abandoned. In the 1980s the architect Giancarlo De Carlo built a brightly coloured residential neighbourhood to help to repopulate Mazzorbo. In 2019 its population was 256. It is linked to Burano by a wooden bridge. It was once an important trading centre but is now known for its vineyards and orchards. Its main attraction is the fourteenth-century church of Santa Caterina.

== Geography ==
Mazzorbo is situated next to the island of Burano, to its north, to which it is linked by a bridge, and to the west of the island of Torcello. It lies to the north of the palude di Santa Caterina marsh and to the west of the palude del Monte marsh. The canals around the island are the Canale Borgogni and Canale di Burano channels to the west, the Canale Scomerzera di Mazzorbo channel (the western end of which separates it from Burano) to the south, the Canale Santa Caterina channel (which separates it from the Santa Caterina island) to the east and the Canale di Mazzorbo channel to the north. The latter separates Mazzorbo from the larger Mazzorbetto island. Mazzorbo is linked to the island of Murano and the central part of the lagoon by the Canale Scomenzera di San Giacomo canal.

Mazzorbo is part of a group of four islands. To its west there is the island of Santa Caterina to which Mazzorbo is separated by the Santa Caterina channel. The two islands are connected by two bridges. The Santa Caterina island was split into two in 1928 when an extension of the Canale di Mazzorbo channel (the Santa Margherita canal) was dug to connect Mazzorbo’s northern shore to the Canale Scomerzera San Giacomo canal. To the north there is Mazzorbetto, which is separated by the some-60 m wide Canale di Mazzorbo channel. Although in Italian Mazzorbetto sounds like “little Mazzorbo,” it is the largest island of the group.

== Etymology ==
In the past Mazzorbo was variously called Maioribus or Maiorbo (1137), Maiorbenses (1143) or Maiurbo (1228).

Jacopo Filiasi, a late 18th/early 19th century historian, argued that the origin of the name Mazzorbo was the Latin term Major Urbs, Major Urbi, and Majurbium, Great or Major Town, and that this settlement was the largest town in the whole of Byzantine Venezia Marittima, the coastal area of north-eastern Italy which was under the Byzantines in the 6th century. However, the work of many historians, including Roberto Cessi, has shown that Mazzorbo was never mentioned in the ancient and medieval chronicles. Therefore, this hypothesis seems unlikely. It has been suggested that Filiasi’s interpretation came in the context of the patriotic and aggrandising panegyric typical of 19th-century Venice and anti-Austrian rhetoric during the Austrian occupation.

In the basis of the lack of mentions of Mazzorbo in the old chronicles, Cristoforo Tentori Spagnuolo, another late 18th/early 19th century historian, argued that the origin of the name Mazzorbo was Medium Urbis, ”Town in Between” or “Town in the Middle” (of other towns).

A Roman stone inscription which was discovered in the 19th century, the Epigrafe Torcellana (Torcello Epigraph), commemorates a donation to the town of Altinum by Tiberius Claudius Nero who, during his consulate (13-14 BCE) built temples, porticoes and gardens. It describes the town, its districts and gates and mentions the Maedium Urbis gate. The inscription was placed on this gate, which was in the northeast of the town. This name also appears in other sources, where it is sometimes written as Medium Urbium or Mediurbium. This was also the name of the sixth district of the town. According to Simone Menegaldo, the refugees from Altinum gave this name to this island because it was in between other islands they settled (Burano, Torcello, and Costanziaco).

== History ==
It is often held that the settlements in Mazzorbo and the other islands in the northern part of the Lagoon of Venice were built by refugees from the nearby coastal town of Altinum either when it was destroyed by Attila of the Huns in 452 or from the inland areas of the Veneto and Friuli-Venezia Giulia regions when they were conquered by the Lombards in 569-615. However, in 1881, archaeologists discovered Mycenaean pottery on the island, which shows that there was already commercial activity in 1600–1100 BCE.

Like the settlements on other islands of the northern part of the lagoon (Torcello, Costanziaco, Ammiana and Burano) Mazzorbo was one of the earliest settlement in the Lagoon which predated the development of Venice. These settlements thrived from the 9th to the 14th century when they were the hub of maritime trade with the Adriatic Sea and the rest of the Mediterranean Sea. Flaminio Corner, an 18th-century historian, wrote that "[the island of Mazzorbo] is divided into two by a wide canal which flows in the middle and separates the island into a western and eastern part, it lies among other islands, a long time ago it was a breathing space of the Nobles, when they were dedicated to a fruitful maritime trade."

Mazzorbo and the other islands in the area declined with the urbanisation of Rivoalto, which developed into the city of Venice and became the dominant centre of the lagoon. Many families moved to Venice. In addition, there was environmental degradation caused by floods which eroded the banks of the islands and various buildings, the expansion of the surrounding marshes and problems with malaria. Eventually, Mazzorbo and other islands in the area were abandoned.

With the depopulation of this part of the Lagoon of Venice, many religious institutions were established on these islands. Despite not being a large settlement, Mazzorbo had five monasteries and five parish churches. The monasteries were Santa Eufemia (which was dissolved and demolished in 1768), San Maffio (which was dissolved and demolished during Napoleon's occupation of Venice and its lagoon), Santa Maria Valverde, Santa Maria delle Grazie and Santa Caterina. The parish churches were: San Pietro, San Bartolomeo (which was demolished in 1810 during the Napoleonic occupation), San Angelo, Santo Stefano and Santi Cosma e Damiano. With the decline of the island and with the dissolution of churches and monasteries, all of these churches and monasteries, except for the Santa Caterina church, were demolished and no trace of them remains.

The above mentioned names (Maioribus, Maiorbo and Maiurbo) referred to a settlement which comprised all of the three-island group (prior to the splitting of the S. Caterina island in 1928). In fact, the San Matteo monastery was on the Santa Caterina island. The Sant' Eufemia monastery was in the southeast of the Mazzorbetto island, along the Canale di Mazzorbo channel and with its entrance facing the Canale Bognoni channel which leads to Torcello. The San Pietro church was at the southwestern end of Mazzorbetto.

Not much is known about the life and the politics of Mazzorbo before its abandonment. There are only archival documents which mainly record information about its religious institutions. The monasteries also provided for the education of young noble women. Through this connection with the nobility, the churches and monasteries of Mazzorbo were endowed with artworks by painters and other artists who were renown at the time.

== Disappeared churches and monasteries ==
=== San Pietro Parish Church ===
The only archival document relating to the parish church of San Pietro is dated to 1207. It was probably Mazzorbo’s main church. The date of its construction is not known. It seems that it was built with materials from Altinum and thus could be dated to the 7th-8th century. Tradition notes its beauty and the marble columns of its portico and claims that St. Francis and St. Antony preached here. Over the main altar there was a panel with “St. Peter and St. Paul” by Pietro Ricchi and over the St. Margaret altar there was the Madonna, St. Bartholomew and St. Margaret panel by Francesco Ruschi.

There was a gilded silver altarpiece which was probably kept in the main altar and then, as noted in a 1681 pastoral visit by the bishop of Torcello, was put at the bottom of a large crucifix in front of the main chapel which shared the nave of the presbytery with an iconostasis with the twelve apostles. It was probably the type of 12th-century Venetian goldsmith work inspired by Byzantine iconographic elements. It was made of gilded silver tiles nailed to wooden panels with sacred images which represented the Madonna, the Saints and Christ the Saviour.

From the 14th century, Mazzorbo underwent a period of slow decline and became depopulated. San Pietro became impoverished. In 1736, Ferrazzi, a parish priest, complained about having to resort to act as a chaplain for the St. Matthew nuns to get some money because donations to the church were not enough to get by despite getting an annual income from two secular confraternities. With the dissolution of churches and monasteries ordered during Napoleon's occupation of Venice the derelict church was demolished. Now there is only a plot of land which belongs to the current parish church of Santa Caterina. The precious altarpiece was lost.

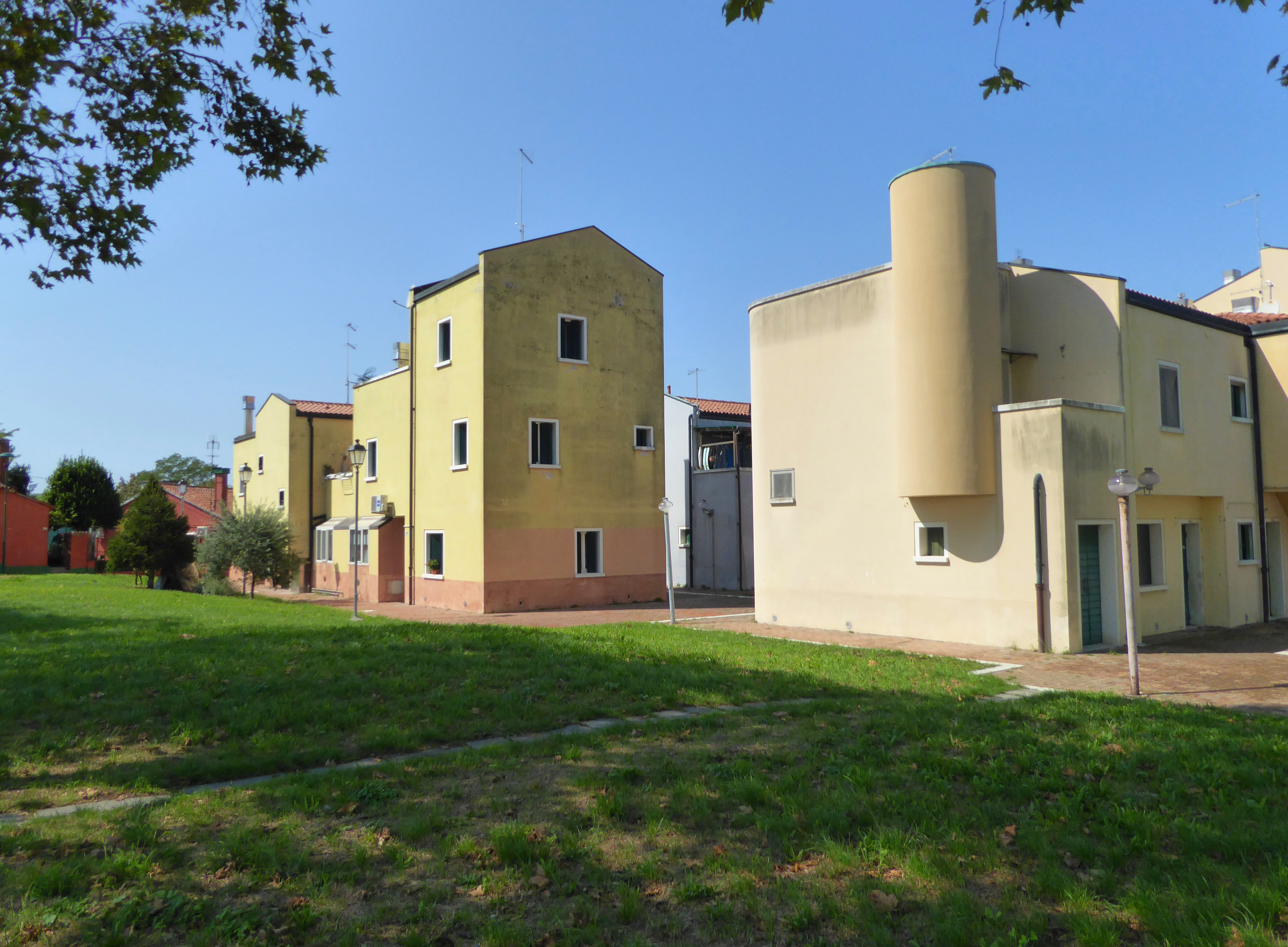
Houses in Mazzorbo

=== San Bartolomeo Parish Church ===
In the eastern part of Mazzorbo there was another very old parish church. It was dedicated to St. Bartholomew There are no documents regarding its foundation. Flaminio Corner wrote that it was dissolved in the 17th century because it was no longer able to sustain itself and was merged with the San Pietro parish church. It was replaced by an oratory at the edge of the parish. In 1775 the bishop of Torcello described it as an oratory with a chaplain. Zanetti noted that there was a Saint Bernard panel by Antonio Zanchi. The oratory was demolished in 1830. A document in the Mazzorbo parish archive it is noted that the materials from its demolition fetched 203 liras.

=== San Matteo Monastery ===
In 1218 the bishop of Torcello donated a very old church dedicated to St Mathew to three Benedictine nuns on the island of Costanziaco. This island became uninhabitable due to environmental degradation caused by floods breaking the banks of the island and damaging buildings and malaria. The nuns were moved to Mazzorbo, on the Santa Caterina island, opposite the San Pietro church, on the other side of the canal. Construction of the new monastery begun in 1298.

There were disputes in the 14th and 15th centuries. In 1341 the nuns asked to be put under the jurisdiction of the abbot of Piacenza due to disagreements with their superior. The Patriarchs of Constantinople and of Grado were drawn into the dispute. This was resolved by Pope Paul II (1464–71) who had the nuns to submit to the Patriarch of Venice in 1464. In 1521, during the pontificate of Leo X (1513–21), the 50 nuns of S. Matteo were sent to join the 5 nuns of the old Benedictine Monastery of Santa Margherita on the island of Torcello due to minor disciplinary transgressions.

In 1806, during the Napoleonic dissolution of Venetian churches and monasteries, S. Matteo was demolished, too. There were many paintings and sculptures in this monastery; 92 paintings and 12 terracotta and wooden sculptures were catalogued. They all have been lost. The Santa Margherita canal (see above) was dug for a better connection between the Scomerzera San Giacomo and Mazzorbo canals on the grounds of this monastery a century later. It was opened in 1928.

In the convent’s church there were four panels by Matteo Ingoli: “St Helen kneeling with the cross with four putti in the air”, “The visit of St. Elizabeth”, "St. Jerome, St. Charles and a blessed abbess” and "St. Margaret and her ascent.” Above the main altar there was a panel with various saints, a nun and the map of the monastery attributed by Boschini, an art critic, to the Vivarini schools. Modern art historians instead attribute it to Giovanni Mansueti. Today it is kept in Venetian collection of the heirs of the painter Italico Brass.

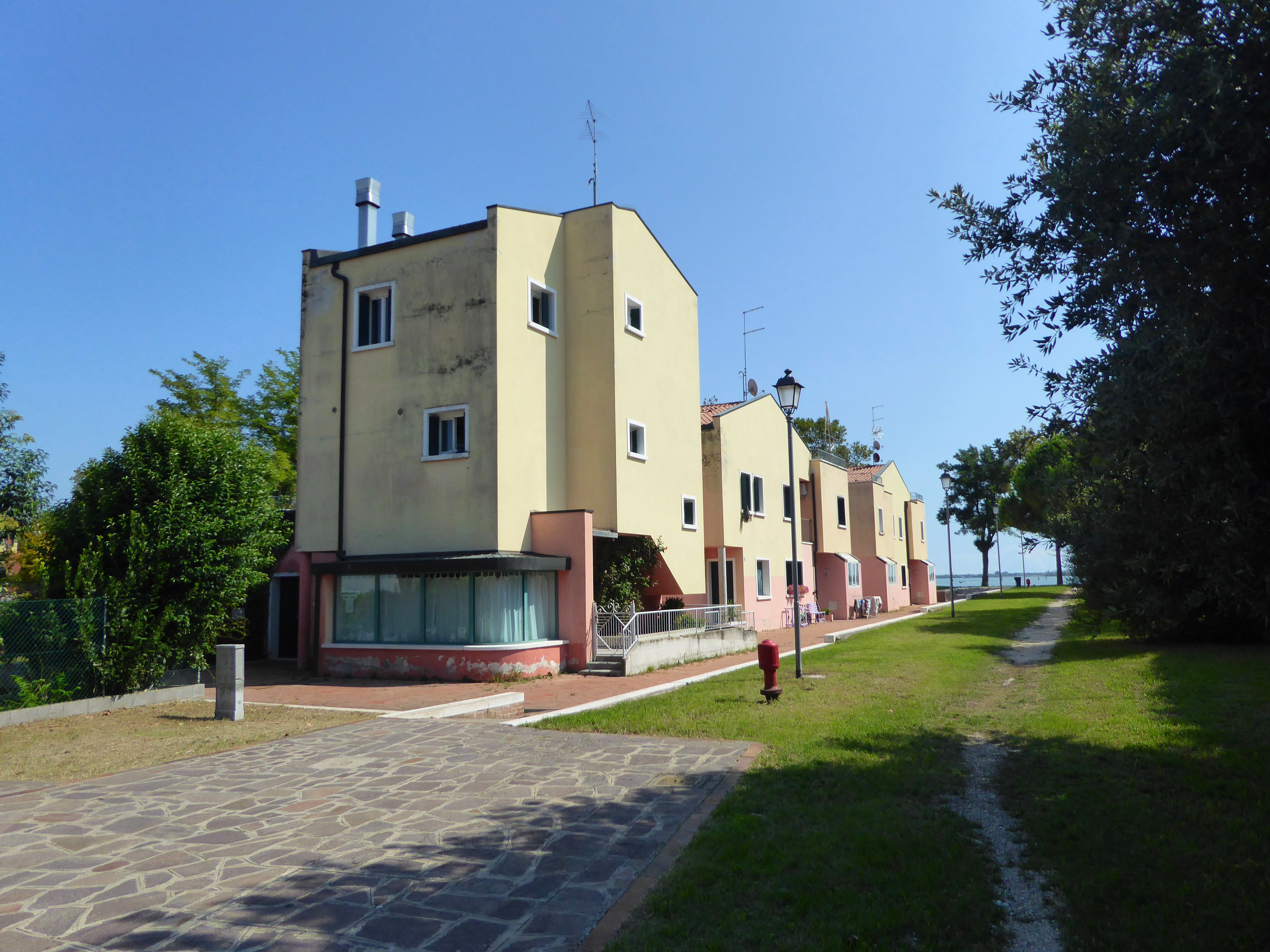
Houses in Mazzorbo

=== Santa Eufemia Monastery ===
Bernardino Scardeonio’s History of Paduan Antiquity tells that Margherita, a Padua noblewoman, withdrew to Mazzorbo with three noble maidens and founded this monastery. It also records that in 1439 the bishop of Torcello sent the Benedictine nuns of the Sant Angelo monastery on the island of Ammiana, whose numbers had been reduced to three due to environmental degradation and depopulation in that island, to the monastery. In 1768 the senate of the Republic of Venice dissolved the monastery and its church. The buildings were used for military purposes. In the early 19th century a fort was built here. There is no trace of it left.

In Murano there is a well curb which used to be in the courtyard of the monastery. It has this inscription: “IN TEMPO DELLA R.M. SUOR SCOLASTICA PISANI DIG.MA ABBAD. / PUTEUS ACQUAR VIVENTIUMQUAE / FLUUNT IMPETU DE LIBANO / MDLXXXVIII DIE X DECEM”

== Santa Caterina, the only surviving church ==
This the only surviving church in Mazzorbo. According to a 1715 chronicle by Bernardo Trevisan, a Venetian nobleman, Santa Caterina was built in 783. It was rebuilt between 1283 and 1291 and annexed to a Benedictine nun convent with the same name. The convent was behind the church. It was demolished in 1806 during the Napoleonic dissolution of monasteries. The church was tuned into a parish church. By then it had been in decline. In 1819 it became the only parish church in Mazzorbo. Major restoration work in 1920-25 altered the original structure. Restoration work in 2002 re-established the original bricked wall.

Its earliest mention is in the acts of a parish synod convened by the bishop of Torcello in 1374. The oldest archival document is a 1398 pledge of loyalty to the bishop of Torcello by the abbess. In the 14th century the nuns experienced hardship. In 1314 the Murano chapter granted them a marsh so that they could benefit from the revenues of its mills. However, this income was not enough, and the number of nuns decreased. In 1432 the revenues of the monastery of Santa Maria della Gaiada on the Tumba della Gaiada island (which was part of the settlement of Ammiana) were incorporated into those of Santa Caterina. In 1492 the dissolved Benedictine monastery of San Nicolo was merged with Santa Caterina.

The complex was restored in 1712 by Pietro Tabacco, a nobleman who in the same period founded the Madonna del Rosario church on the Madonna del Monte island, towards Murano. To provide further aid, the Bishop of Torcello merged Santa Caterina with Santa Maria della Gaiada monastery, which had been abandoned.

The church has a unique aisle with a ceiling which resembles the hull of a ship dating to the 15th century. There are several paintings. The most important are the “Mystical wedding of Saint Katherine” by Matteo Ponzone and one by Giuseppe Porta. Above the entrance door there is a sculptured marble lunette with the “Mystical wedding of Saint Katherine and two Donors.” Christ is sitting on a throne holding an open book which reads “EGO SUM LUS MUNDI” in his left hand. With his right hand he puts a ring on the finger of a kneeling St. Katherine. The bell tower was built in the 14th century and has the oldest bell in the lagoon. It dates to 1318.

== Mazzorbo today ==
Mazzorbo today is a sparsely populated island devoted mainly to agriculture with vegetable growing, vineyards and orchards. Mazzorbetto and Santa Caterina are also devoted to agriculture. In the latter two there are several farmsteads and hardly any inhabitants.

At the eastern end of Mazzorbo, by the bridge which connects it to Burano, there is the Scarpa farm. It has a number of buildings, some of which date to the 16th century, vineyards, fruit trees and vegetable areas which are surrounded by a 19th-century wall. It was bought by Venice council in 1999 and after it was restored in 2006 it was opened to the public. It has information about the history of local agriculture. The Dorona grape is grown here. This is a fine grape which is native of the lagoon and has been recently been selected from centuries-old vines.

Giancarlo De Carlo was an architect who belonged to a new generation of architects who wanted to develop a new type of architecture, one which was better suited to local social and environmental conditions and where man "is not reduced to an abstract figure". He theorized a more democratic and open "participatory architecture". In 1979 he built a brightly painted housing neighbourhood to help to repopulate the island.
