= Santa Giustina, Venice =

Church building in Venice, Italy

Coordinates: 45°26′17″N 12°20′46″E

Church of Santa Giustina
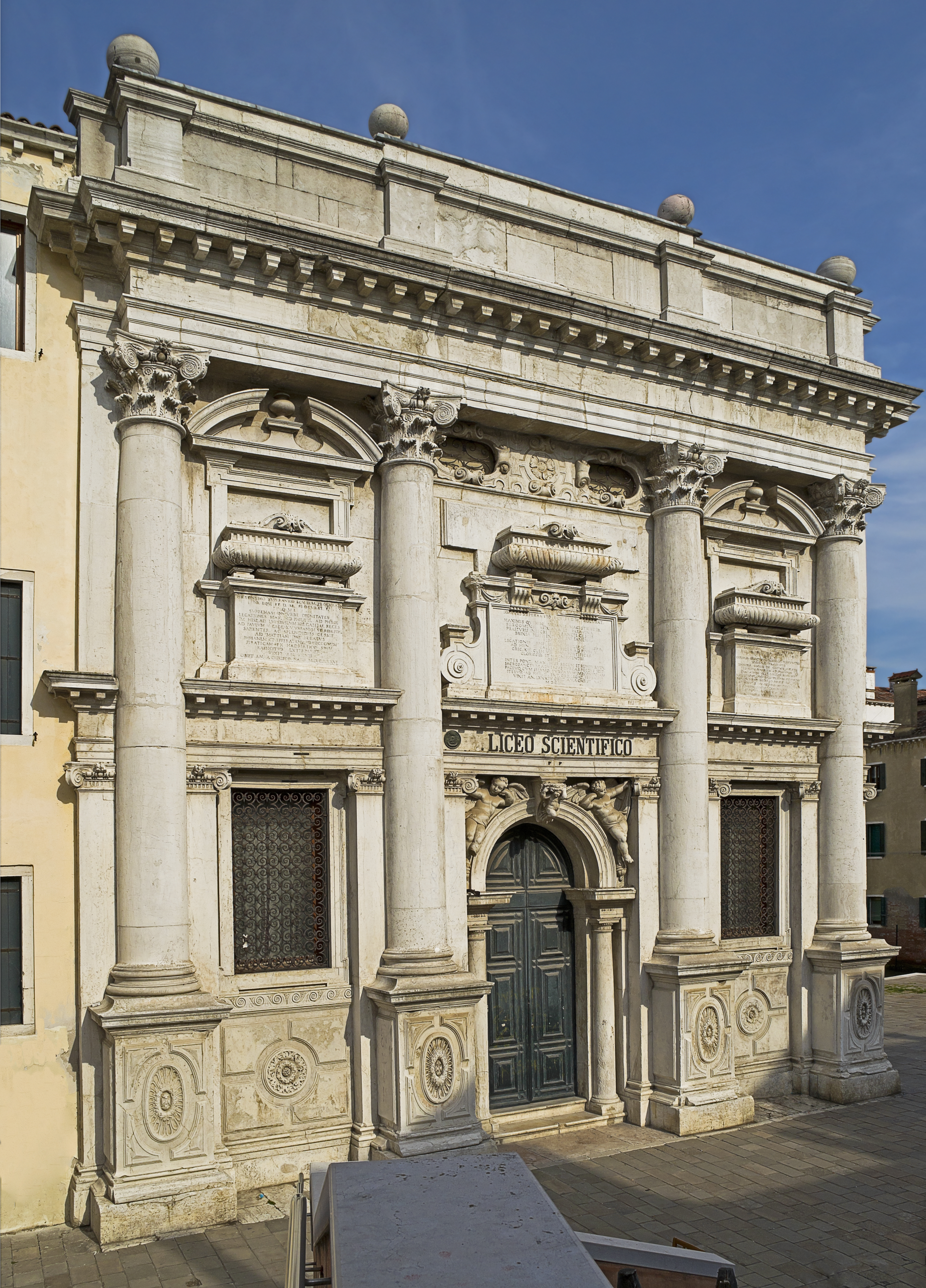

- Location within Venice Location within Italy

Religion
- Affiliation: Roman Catholic
- Province: Venice
- Year consecrated: deconsecrated

Location
- Location: Venice, Italy

Architecture
- Architect: Baldassare Longhena
- Type: Church
- Style: Baroque
- Completed: 1677

Santa Giustina di Venezia is a deconsecrated, former Roman Catholic church building in the sestiere of Castello, Venice.

== History ==
It was initially rebuilt in the second half of the 15th century by Augustinian nuns. The Convent was suppressed in 1896. The façade is garlanded with Istrian marble, and was initially commissioned by the procurator of St. Mark, Giovanni Soranzo, who asked Baldassare Longhena to design and rebuild the church in a Baroque-style in 1636-77.
