= Sebastiano Ziani =

Doge of Venice from 1172 to 1178

- Sebastiano Ziani kneels before Pope Alexander III (Fresco by Spinello Aretino, 1407).

Doge of Venice
- In office 1172–1178
- Preceded by: Vitale II Michiel
- Succeeded by: Orio Mastropiero

Personal details
- Born: Unknown
- Died: 1178

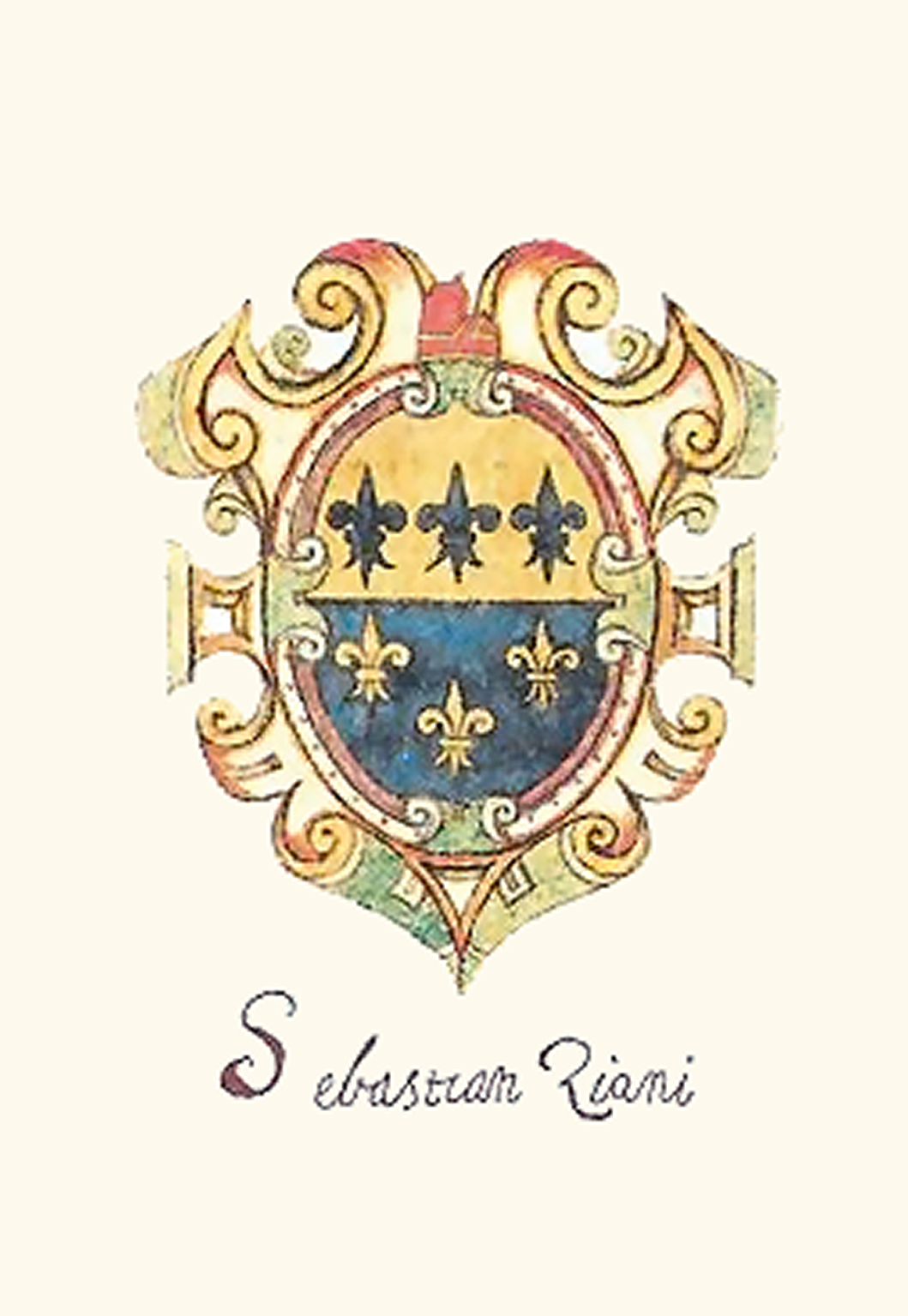
Coat of arms of Sebastiano Ziani

Sebastiano Ziani was Doge of Venice from 1172 to 1178. He was one of the Venice's greatest city planners.

As Doge Ziani divided the city-state into many districts. He donated a piece of land to the city-state and relocated its shipyard there. He funded the construction of the Piazza San Marco. Projects included filling up Rio Batario that ran parallel to the Basilica San Marco which could be found at what is today the half way point of the Piazza. He paved the main square as well as the Piazzetta that it is connected to. Ziani hired an engineer to erect two columns (possibly of Greek origin) that stand at the head of the Piazzetta facing the lagoon.

He also hosted Pope Alexander III, the Emperor Frederick I, and the delegation of William II of Sicily for the signing of the Treaty of Venice in July 1177.

Ziani was married to a woman named Cecilia.

Political offices
Preceded by Vitale II Michiel	Doge of Venice; 1172–1178	Succeeded by Orio Mastropiero
