= Bohemond of Antioch =

Bohemond (or Bohemund) of Antioch may refer to:

- Bohemond I of Antioch (ruled 1098–1111), prince of Antioch and Taranto
- Bohemond II of Antioch (r. 1111–1130), prince of Antioch and Taranto
- Bohemond III of Antioch (r. 1163–1201), prince of Antioch
- Bohemond IV of Antioch (r. 1201–1216, 1219–1233), prince of Antioch and count of Tripoli
- Bohemond V of Antioch (r. 1233–1252), prince of Antioch and count of Tripoli
- Bohemond VI of Antioch (r. 1252–1275), prince of Antioch and count of Tripoli
- Bohemond VII of Antioch (r. 1275–1287), count of Tripoli
