= Venice =

City in Veneto, Italy

Venice Venezia (Italian) Venesia (Venetian)
- Comune
- Comune di Venezia
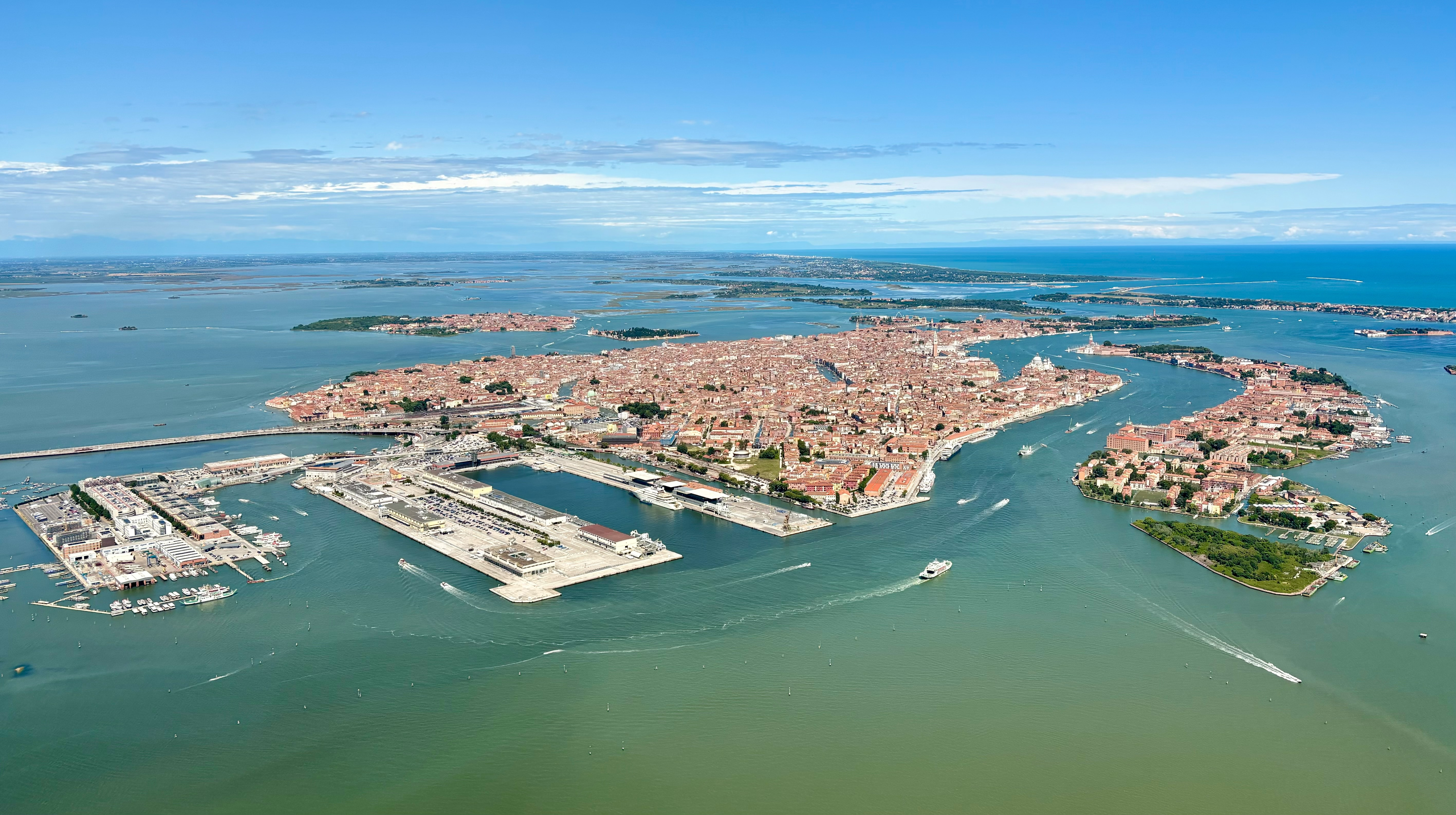
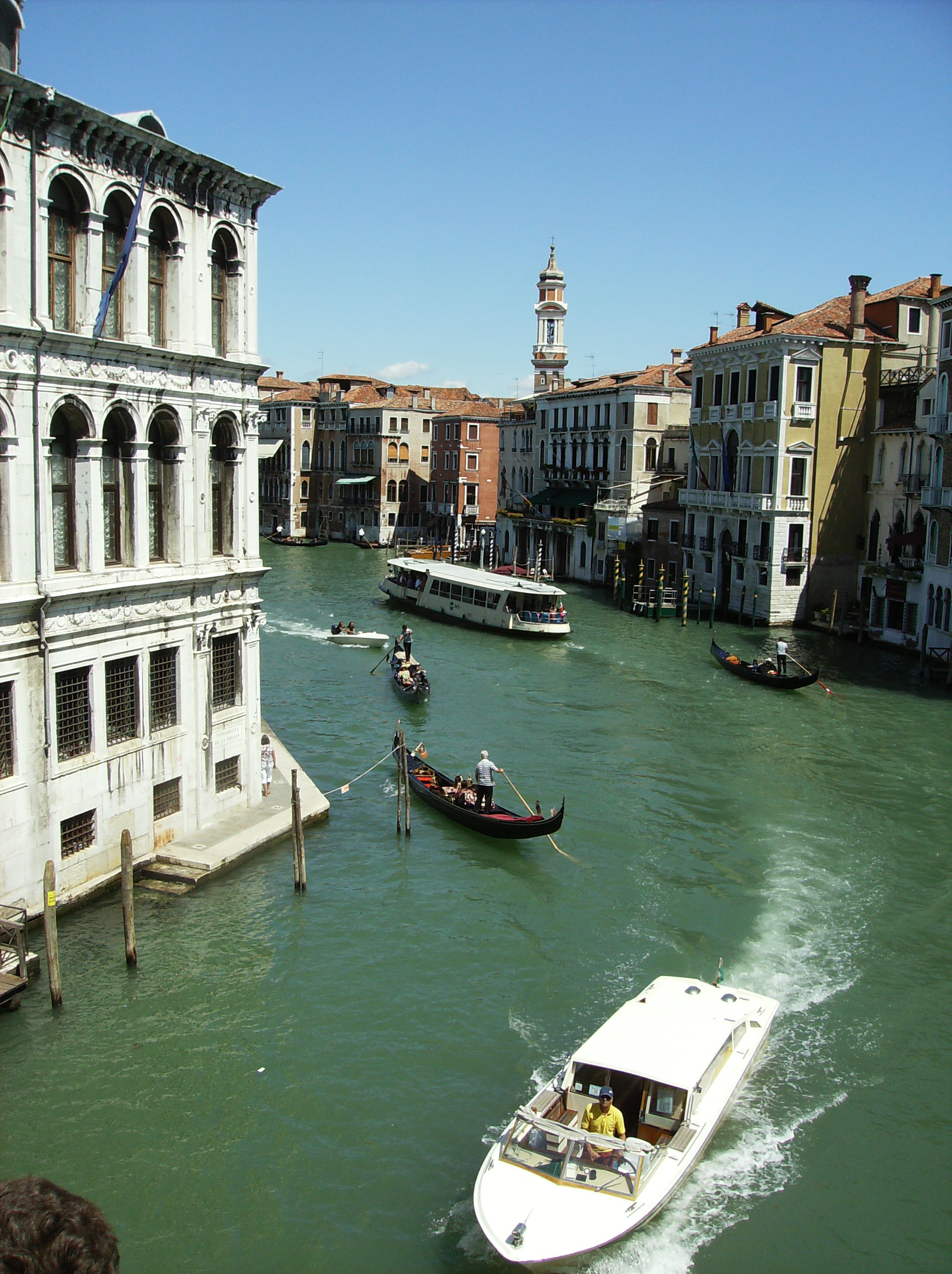
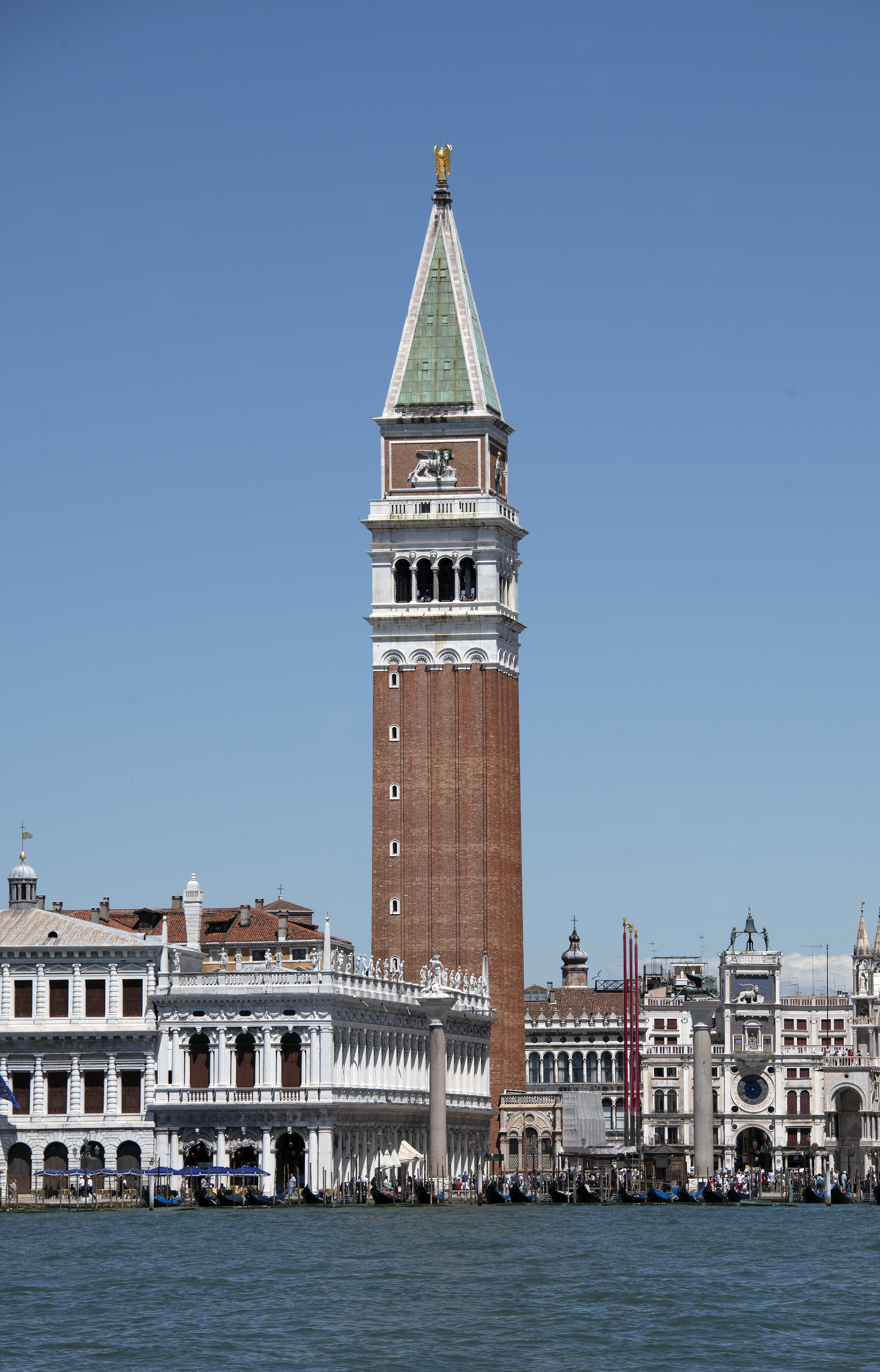
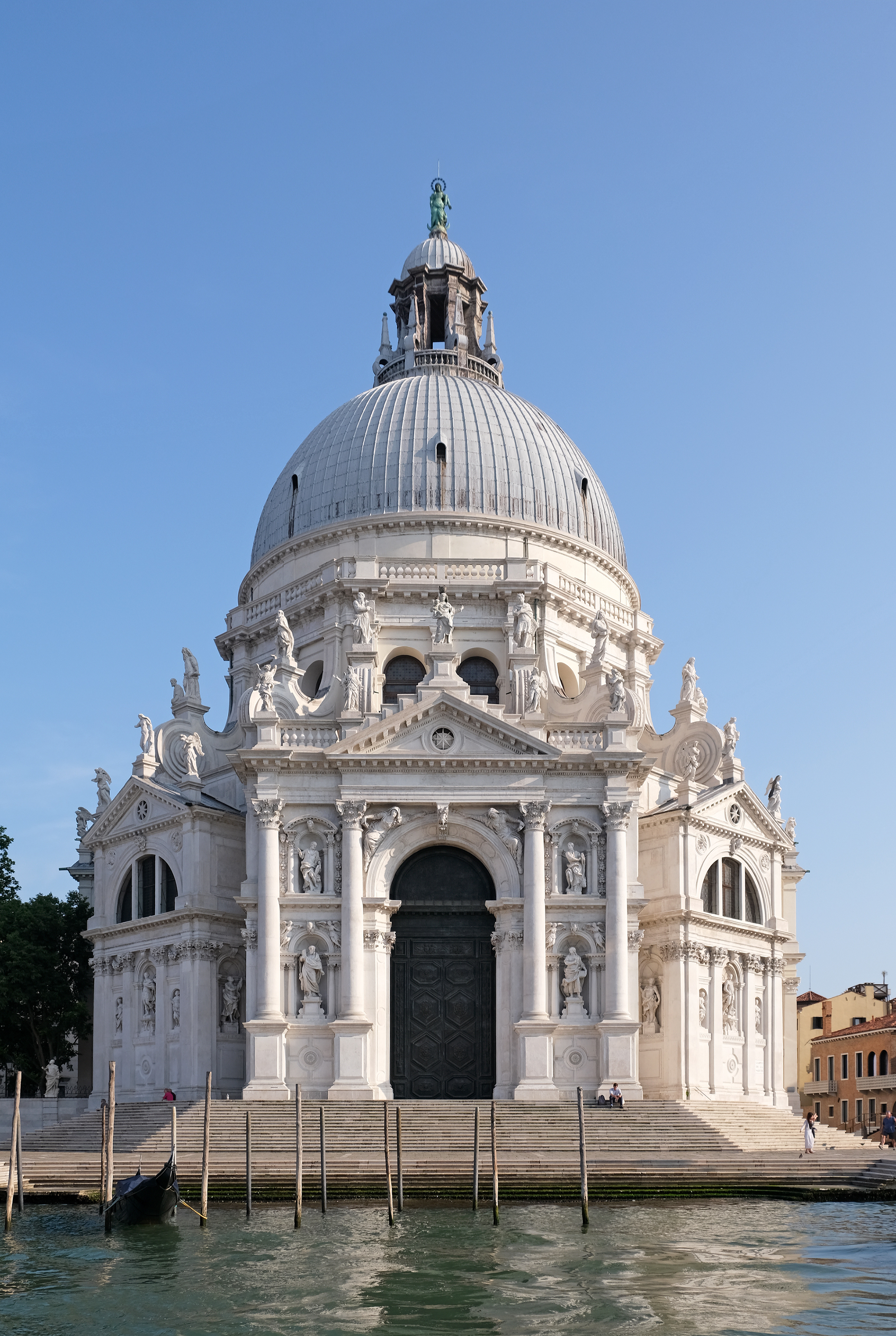
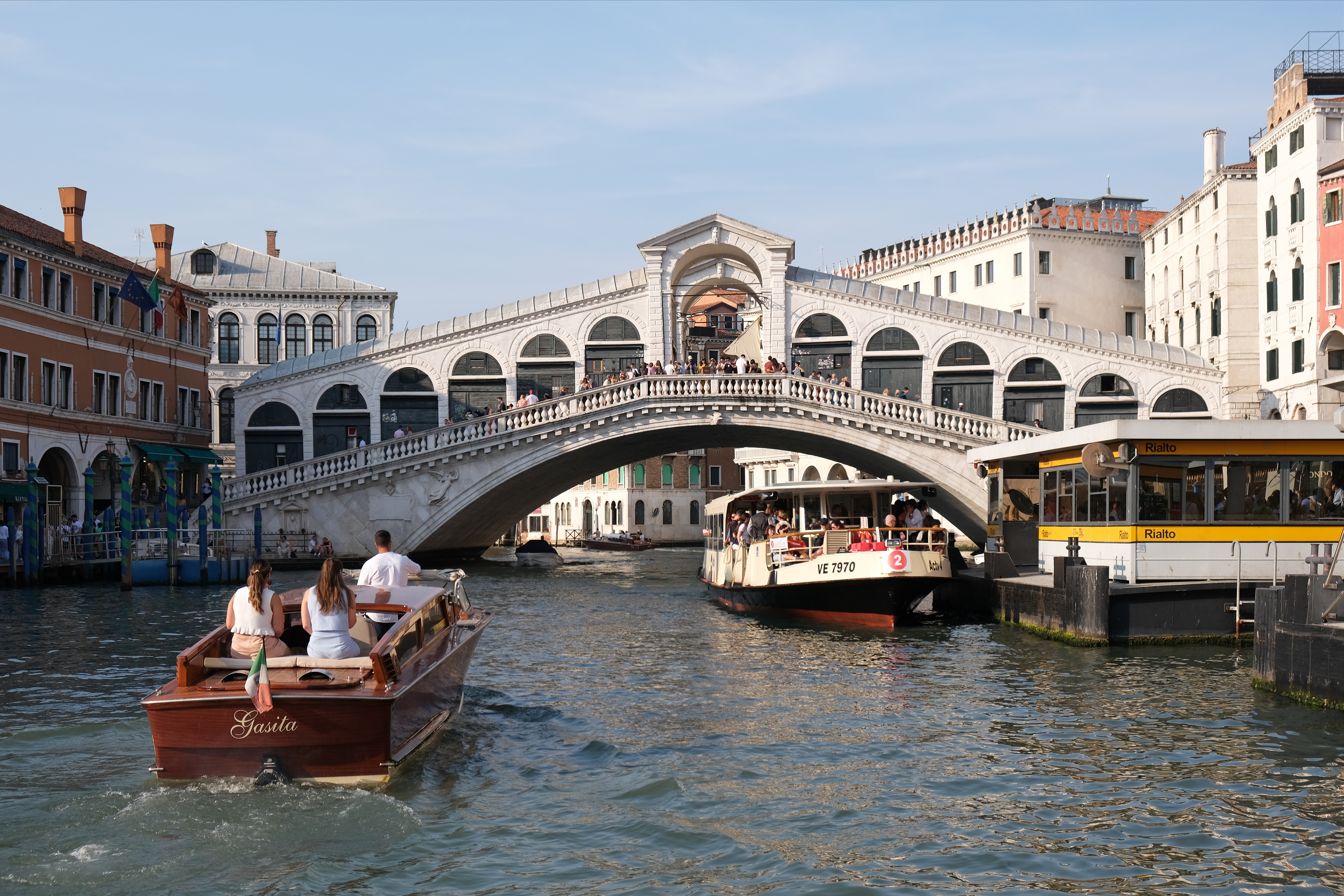
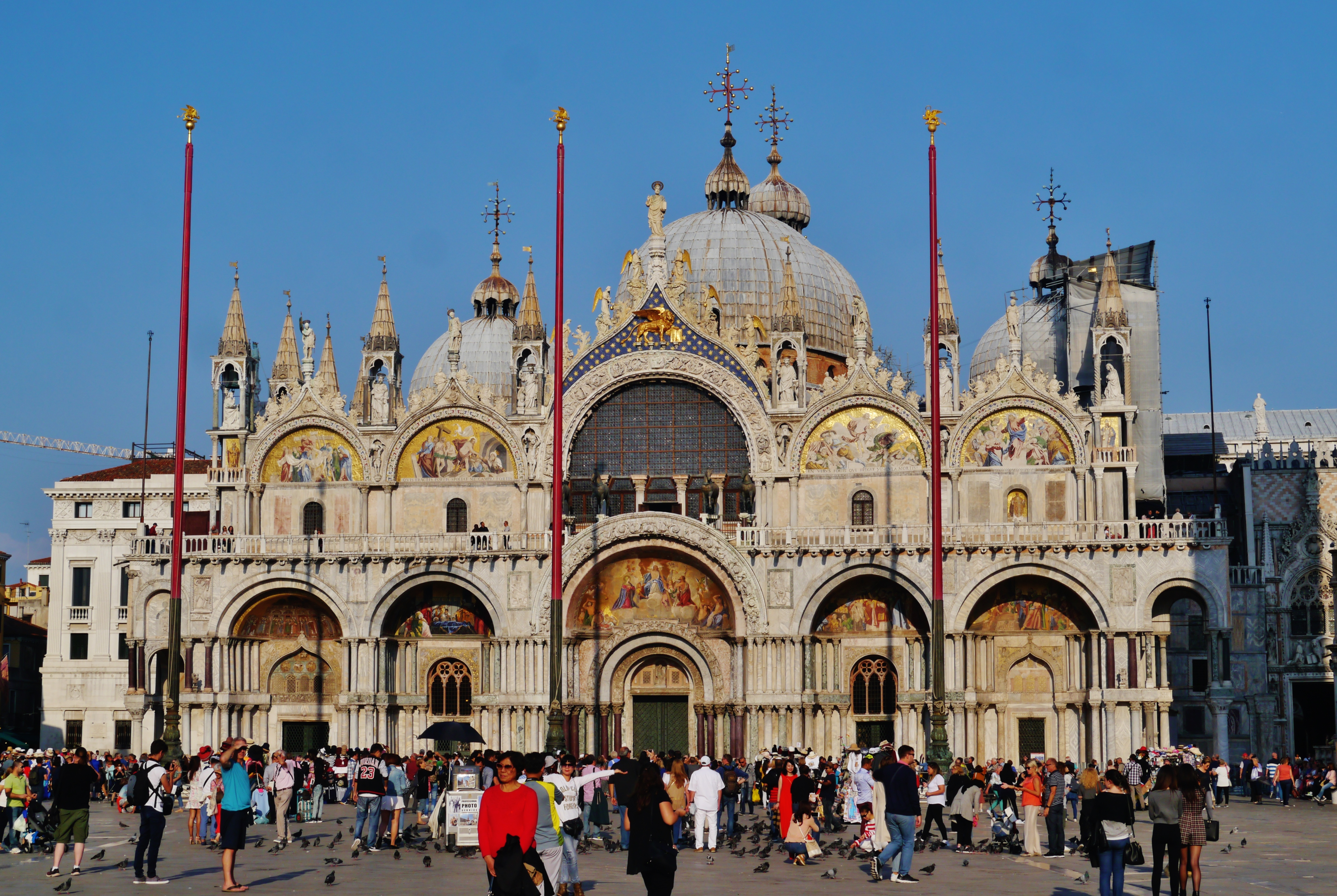
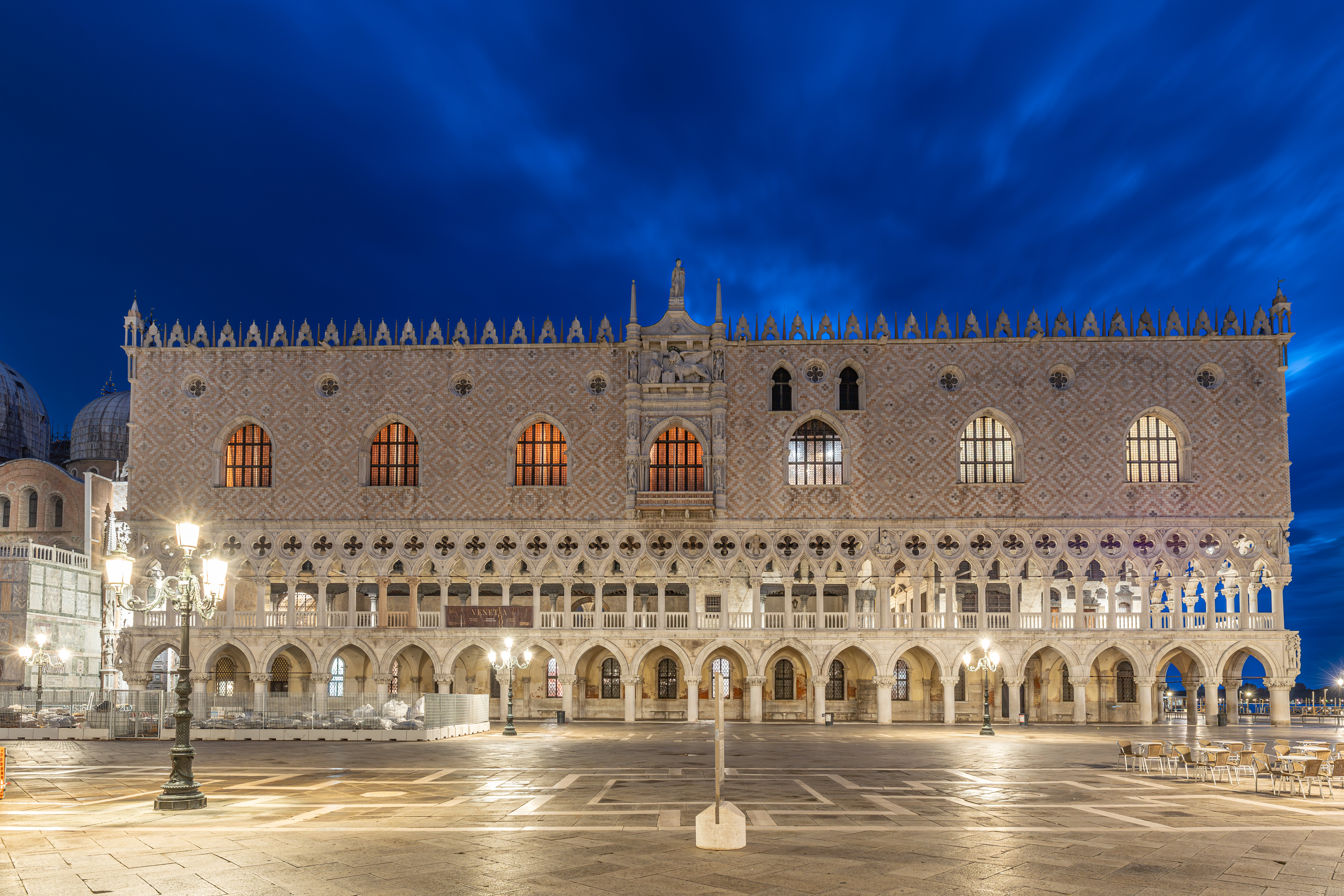
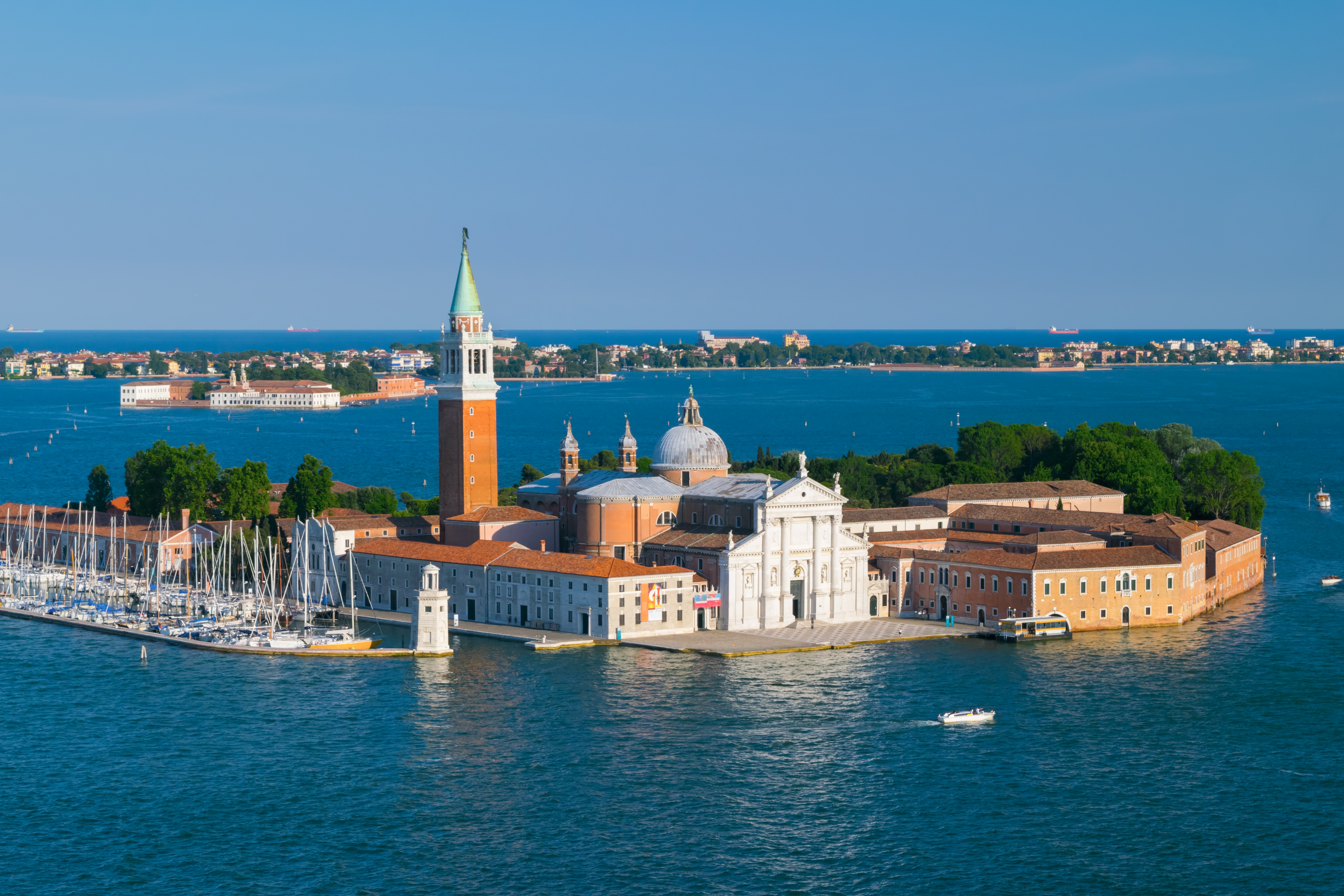
- Aerial view of Venice Grand Canal St Mark's Campanile Salute Rialto Bridge St Mark's Basilica Doge's Palace San Giorgio Maggiore

- Flag Coat of arms
- Nicknames: La Serenissima (The Most Serene), La Dominante (The Dominant), Città delle maschere (City of Masks)
- Motto(s): Pax tibi Marce, evangelista meus "Peace be with you, Mark, my evangelist".
- Interactive map of Venice
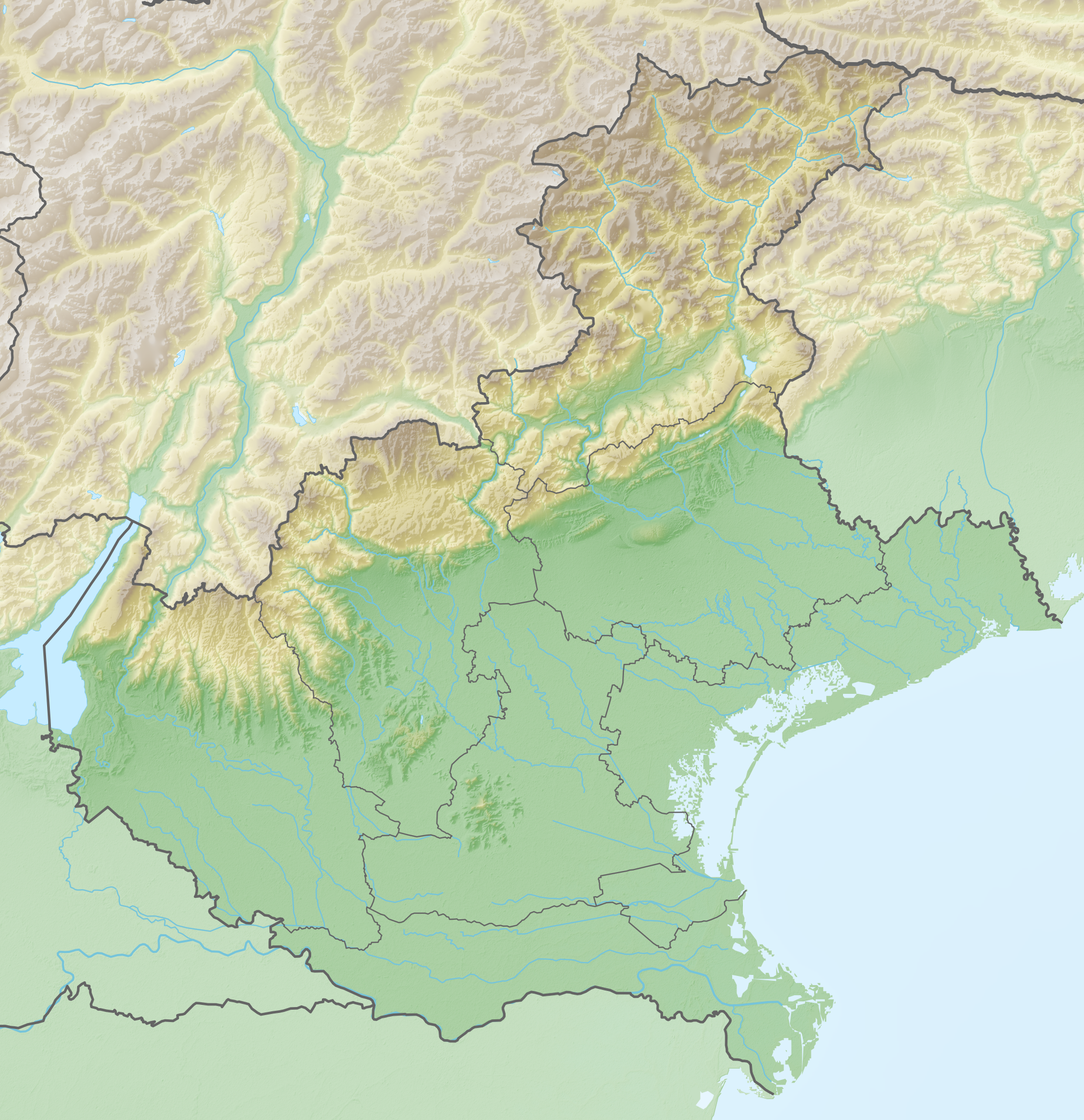
- Location within Italy Location within Veneto Location within Europe
- Coordinates: 45°26′15″N 12°20′9″E
- Country: Italy
- Region: Veneto
- Metropolitan city: Venice (VE)
- Frazioni: Chirignago, Favaro Veneto, Mestre, Marghera, Murano, Burano, Giudecca, Lido, Zelarino

Government
  - Mayor: Simone Venturini

Area
  - Total: 415.90 km^{2} (160.58 sq mi)
- Elevation: 1 m (3.3 ft)

Population (2026)
  - Total: 249,385
  - Density: 599.63/km^{2} (1,553.0/sq mi)
- Demonym(s): Veneziano; Venetian (English)
- Time zone: UTC+1 (CET)
  - Summer (DST): UTC+2 (CEST)
- Postal code: 30100
- Dialing code: 041
- ISTAT code: 027042
- Patron saint: St. Mark the Evangelist
- Saint day: 25 April
- Website: Official website

Venice and its Lagoon
UNESCO World Heritage Site
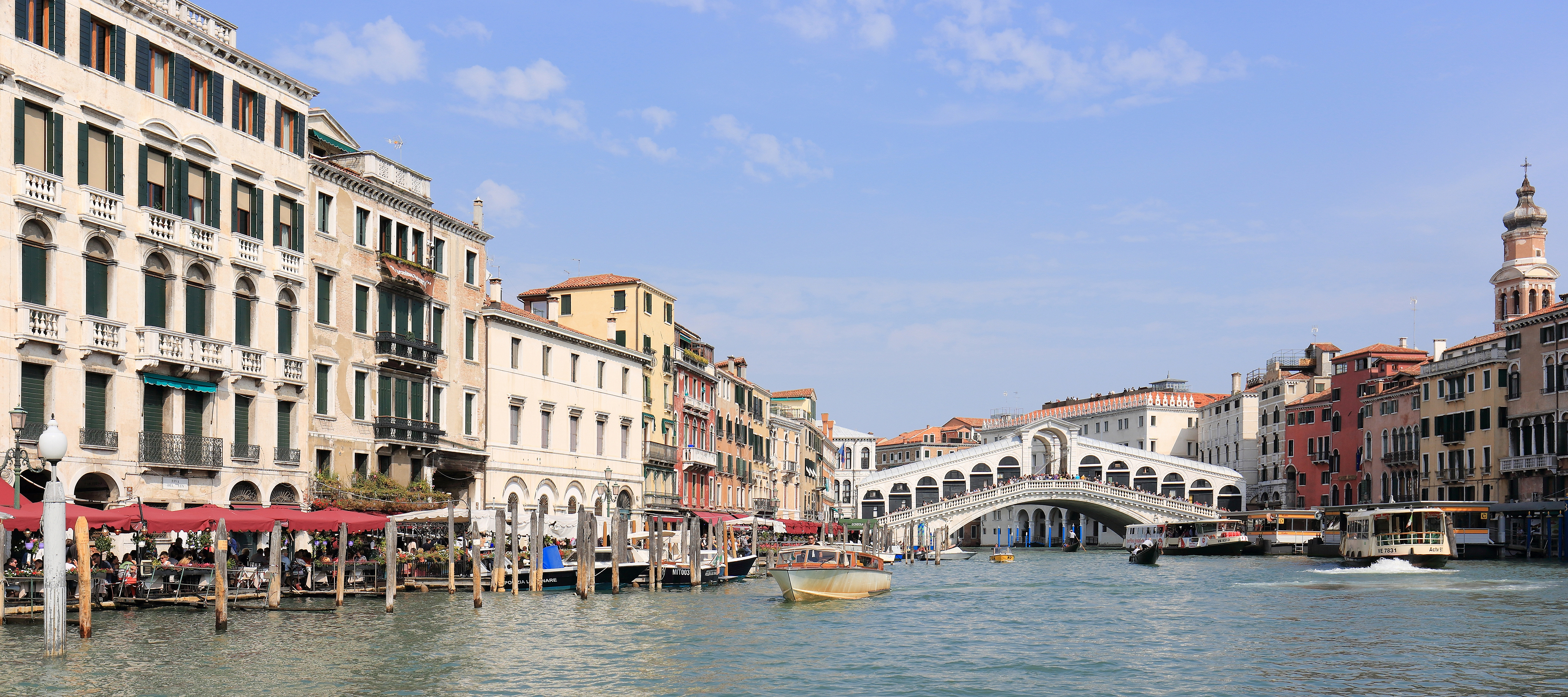
- Venice in autumn, with the Rialto Bridge in the background
- Interactive map of Venice and its Lagoon
- Criteria: Cultural: I, II, III, IV, V, VI
- Reference: 394
- Inscription: 1987 (11th Session)

Venice

Venice (Note: /ˈvɛnɪs/ VEN-iss; Italian: Venezia [veˈnɛttsja]; Venetian: Venesia [veˈnɛsja], formerly Venexia [veˈnɛzja]) is a coastal city in northeastern Italy and the capital of the region of Veneto, as well as the Metropolitan City of Venice. It is built on a group of 126 islands that are separated by expanses of open water and by canals; portions of the city are linked by 472 bridges.

The islands are in the shallow Venetian Lagoon, an enclosed bay lying between the mouths of the Po and the Piave rivers (more exactly between the Brenta and the Sile). As of 2026, the city proper (municipality of Venice) has a population of 249,385, nearly 50,000 of whom live in the historical island city of Venice (centro storico), while most of the population resides on the mainland (terraferma), and about 25,000 live on other islands in the lagoon (estuario).

Together with the cities of Padua and Treviso, Venice is included in the Padua-Treviso-Venice Metropolitan Area (PATREVE), which is considered a statistical metropolitan area, with a total population of 2.6 million.

The name is derived from the ancient Veneti people who inhabited the region by the 10th century BC. The city was the capital of the Republic of Venice for almost a millennium, from 810 to 1797. It was a major financial and maritime power during the Middle Ages and Renaissance, and a staging area for the Crusades and the Battle of Lepanto, as well as an important centre of commerce—especially silk, grain, and spice, and of art from the 13th century to the end of the 17th century. The then-city-state is considered to have been the first real international financial centre, emerging in the 9th century and reaching its greatest prominence in the 14th century. This made Venice a wealthy city throughout most of its history.

For centuries, Venice possessed numerous territories along the Adriatic Sea and within the Italian peninsula, leaving a significant impact on the architecture and culture that can still be seen today. The Venetian Arsenal is considered by several historians to be the first factory in history and was the base of Venice's naval power. The sovereignty of Venice came to an end in 1797, at the hands of Napoleon. Subsequently, in 1866, the city became part of the Kingdom of Italy.

Venice has been known as "La Dominante" ("The Dominant" or "The Ruler"), "La Serenissima" ("The Most Serene"), "Queen of the Adriatic", "City of Water", "City of Masks", "City of Bridges", "The Floating City", and "City of Canals." The lagoon and the city within the lagoon were inscribed as a UNESCO World Heritage Site in 1987, covering an area of 70,176.4 hectares (173,410 acres). Venice is known for several important artistic movements – especially during the Italian Renaissance – and has played an important role in the history of instrumental and operatic music; it is the birthplace of Baroque music composers Tomaso Albinoni and Antonio Vivaldi.

In the 21st century, Venice remains a very popular tourist destination and a major cultural centre, and has often been ranked one of the most beautiful cities in the world. It has been described by The Times as one of Europe's most romantic cities and by The New York Times as "undoubtedly the most beautiful city built by man". However, the city faces challenges, including overtourism, pollution, tide peaks, and cruise ships sailing too close to buildings. Because Venice and its lagoon are under constant threat, Venice's UNESCO listing has been under constant examination.

== History ==
=== Origins ===
Timeline of Venice: historical affiliations
421–476	Western Roman Empire
476–493	Kingdom of Odoacer
493–553	Ostrogothic Kingdom
553–584	Eastern Roman Empire
584–697	Byzantine Empire (Exarchate of Ravenna)
697–1797	Republic of Venice
1797–1805	Habsburg monarchy
1805–1814	Kingdom of Italy
1815–1848	Kingdom of Lombardy–Venetia
1848–1849	Republic of San Marco
1849–1866	Kingdom of Lombardy–Venetia
1866–1943	Kingdom of Italy
1943–1945	Italian Social Republic
1946–present	Italian Republic

Although no surviving historical records deal directly with the founding or building of Venice, tradition and the available evidence have led several historians to agree that the original population of Venice consisted of refugees – from nearby Roman cities such as Patavium (Padua), Aquileia, Tarvisium (Treviso), Altinum, and Concordia (modern Portogruaro), as well as from the undefended countryside – who were fleeing successive waves of Germanic and Hun invasions. This is further supported by the documentation on the so-called "apostolic families", the twelve founding families of Venice who elected the first doge, who in most cases trace their lineage back to Roman families. Some late Roman sources reveal the existence of fishermen, on the islands in the original marshy lagoons, who were referred to as incolae lacunae ("lagoon dwellers"). The traditional founding is identified with the dedication of the first church, that of San Giacomo on the islet of Rialto (Rivoalto, "High Shore")—said to have taken place at the stroke of noon on 25 March 421 (the Feast of the Annunciation).

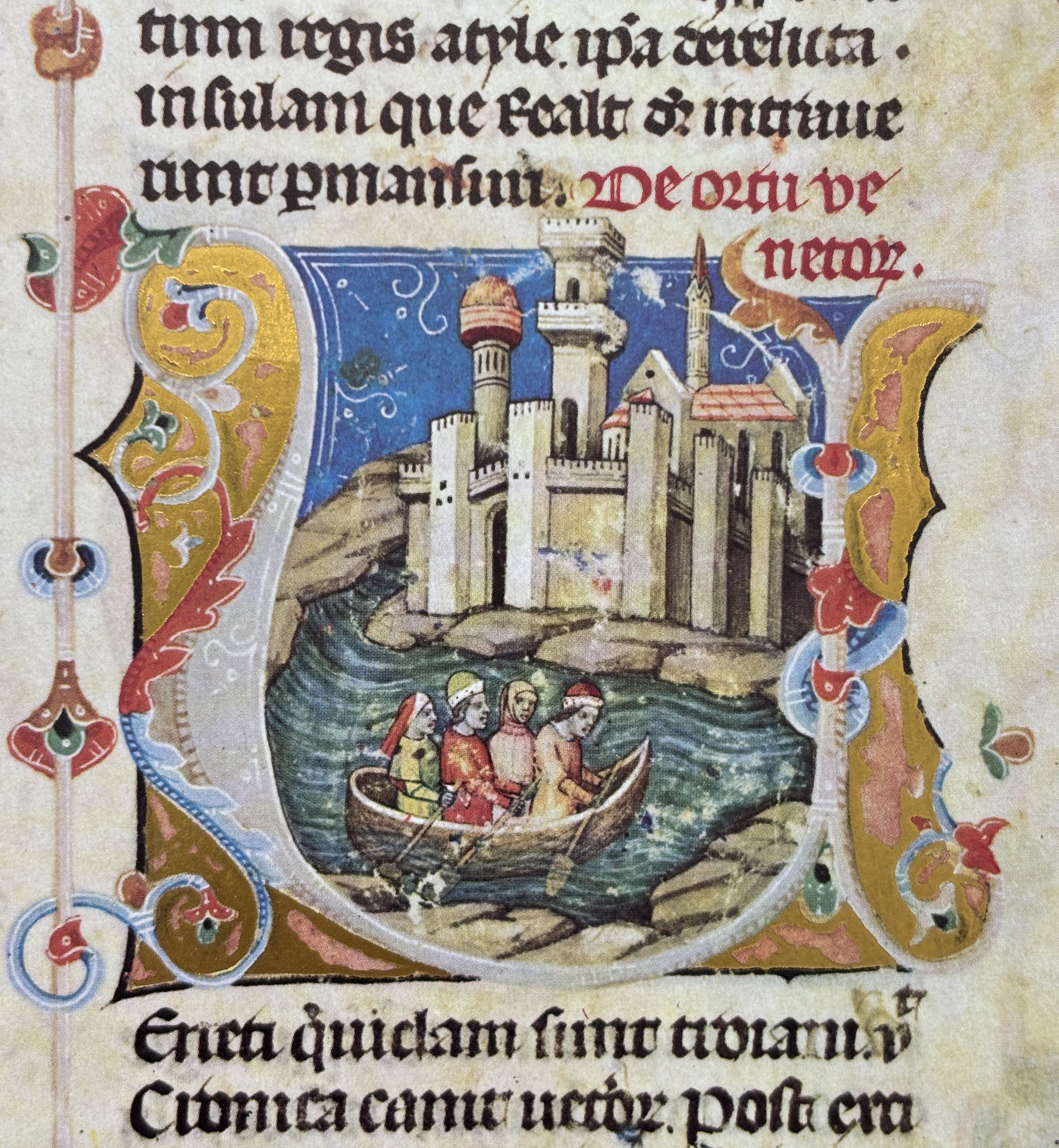
The foundation of Venice as depicted in the Chronicon Pictum in 1358. According to the Hungarian chronicle, King Attila of the Huns besieged Aquileia, the inhabitants of the city first fled to a sea island and then founded Venice on the island of Rialto.

Beginning as early as AD 166–168, the Quadi and Marcomanni destroyed the main Roman town in the area, present-day Oderzo. This part of Roman Italy was again overrun in the early 5th century by the Visigoths and, some 50 years later, by the Huns led by Attila. The last and most enduring immigration into the north of the Italian peninsula, that of the Lombards in 568, left the Eastern Roman Empire only a small strip of coastline in the current Veneto, including Venice. The Roman/Byzantine territory was organized as the Exarchate of Ravenna, administered from that ancient port and overseen by a viceroy (the Exarch) appointed by the Emperor in Constantinople. Ravenna and Venice were connected by just sea routes, and with the Venetians' isolation came increasing autonomy. New ports were built, including those at Malamocco and Torcello in the Venetian lagoon. The tribuni maiores formed the earliest central standing governing committee of the islands in the lagoon, dating from c. 568. (Note: Traditional date as given in William J. Langer, ed. An Encyclopedia of World History.)

The traditional first doge of Venice, Paolo Lucio Anafesto (Anafestus Paulicius), was elected in 697, as written in the oldest chronicle by John, deacon of Venice c. 1008. Some modern historians claim Paolo Lucio Anafesto was actually the Exarch Paul, and Paul's successor, Marcello Tegalliano, was Paul's magister militum (or "general"), literally "master of soldiers." In 726 the soldiers and citizens of the exarchate rose in a rebellion over the iconoclastic controversy, at the urging of Pope Gregory II. The exarch, held responsible for the acts of his master, Byzantine Emperor Leo III, was murdered, and many officials were put to flight in the chaos. At about this time, the people of the lagoon elected their own independent leader for the first time, although the relationship of this to the uprisings is not clear. Ursus was the first of 117 "doges" (doge is the Venetian dialectal equivalent of the Latin dux ("leader"); the corresponding word in English is duke, in standard Italian duca (see also "duce".)). Whatever his original views, Ursus supported Emperor Leo III's successful military expedition to recover Ravenna, sending both men and ships. In recognition of this, Venice was "granted numerous privileges and concessions" and Ursus, who had personally taken the field, was confirmed by Leo as dux and given the added title of hypatus (from the Greek for "consul").

In 751, the Lombard King Aistulf conquered most of the Exarchate of Ravenna, leaving Venice a lonely and increasingly autonomous Byzantine outpost. During this period, the seat of the local Byzantine governor (the "duke/dux", later "doge"), was at Malamocco. Settlement on the islands in the lagoon probably increased with the Lombard conquest of other Byzantine territories, as refugees sought asylum in the area. In 775/6, the episcopal seat of Olivolo (San Pietro di Castello) was created. During the reign of duke Agnello Particiaco (811–827) the ducal seat moved from Malamocco to the more protected Rialto, within present-day Venice. The monastery of St Zachary and the first ducal palace and Basilica of St. Mark, as well as a walled defense (civitatis murus) between Olivolo and Rialto, were subsequently built here.

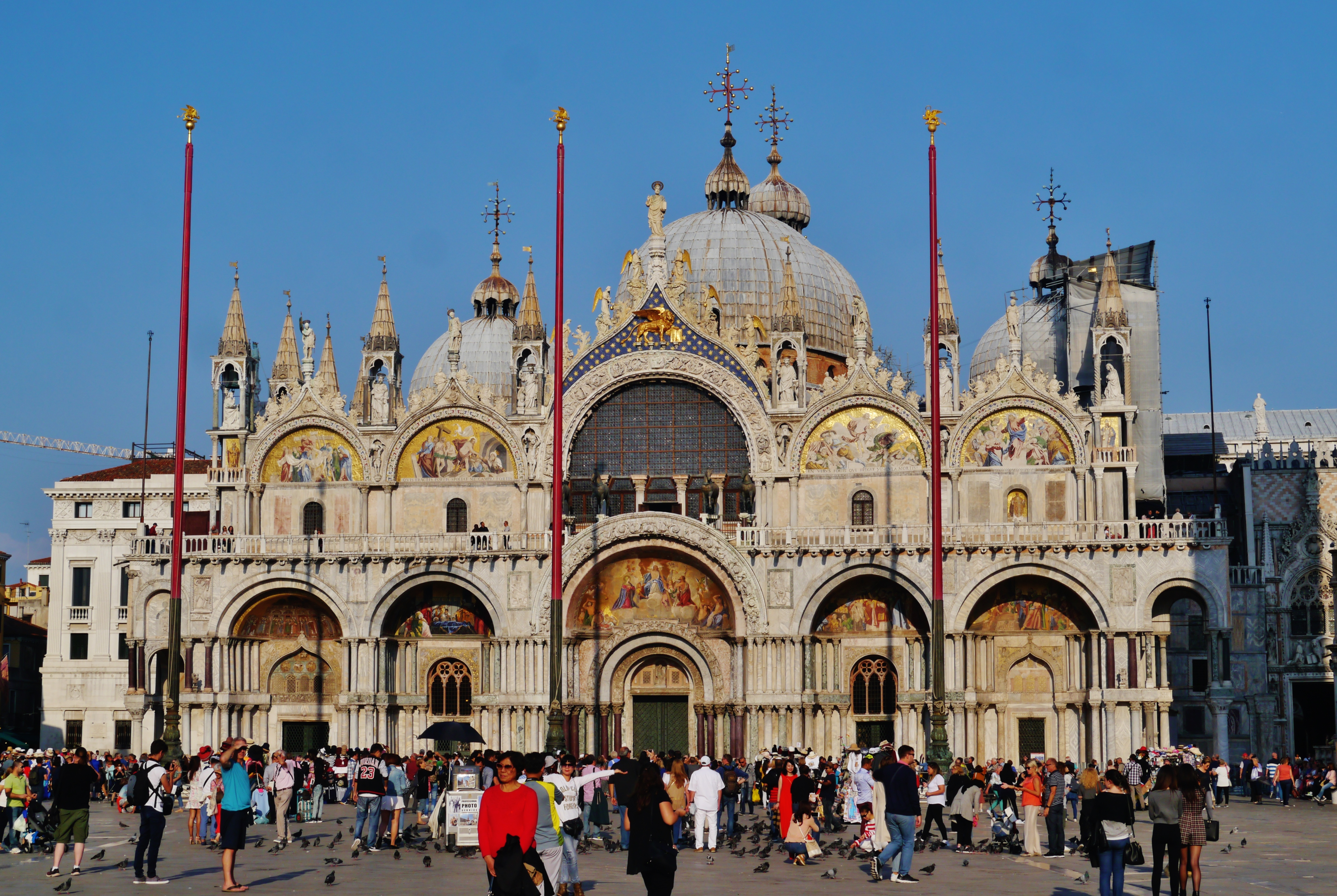
St Mark's Basilica in Venice, one of the best known examples of Italo-Byzantine architecture

Charlemagne sought to subdue the city to his rule. He ordered the pope to expel the Venetians from the Pentapolis along the Adriatic coast; Charlemagne's own son Pepin of Italy, king of the Lombards, under the authority of his father, embarked upon a siege of Venice itself. This, however, proved a costly failure. The siege lasted six months, with Pepin's army ravaged by the diseases of the local swamps and eventually forced to withdraw in 810. A few months later, Pepin himself died, apparently as a result of a disease contracted there. In the aftermath, an agreement between Charlemagne and the Byzantine Emperor Nicephorus in 814 recognized Venice as Byzantine territory, and granted the city trading rights along the Adriatic coast.

By 828, the new city's prestige had increased with the acquisition of relics claimed to be those of St. Mark the Evangelist from Alexandria; these items were placed in the new basilica. Winged lions – visible throughout Venice – are the emblem of St. Mark. The patriarchal seat was also moved to Rialto. As the community continued to develop, and as Byzantine power waned, its own autonomy grew, leading to eventual independence.

=== Expansion ===
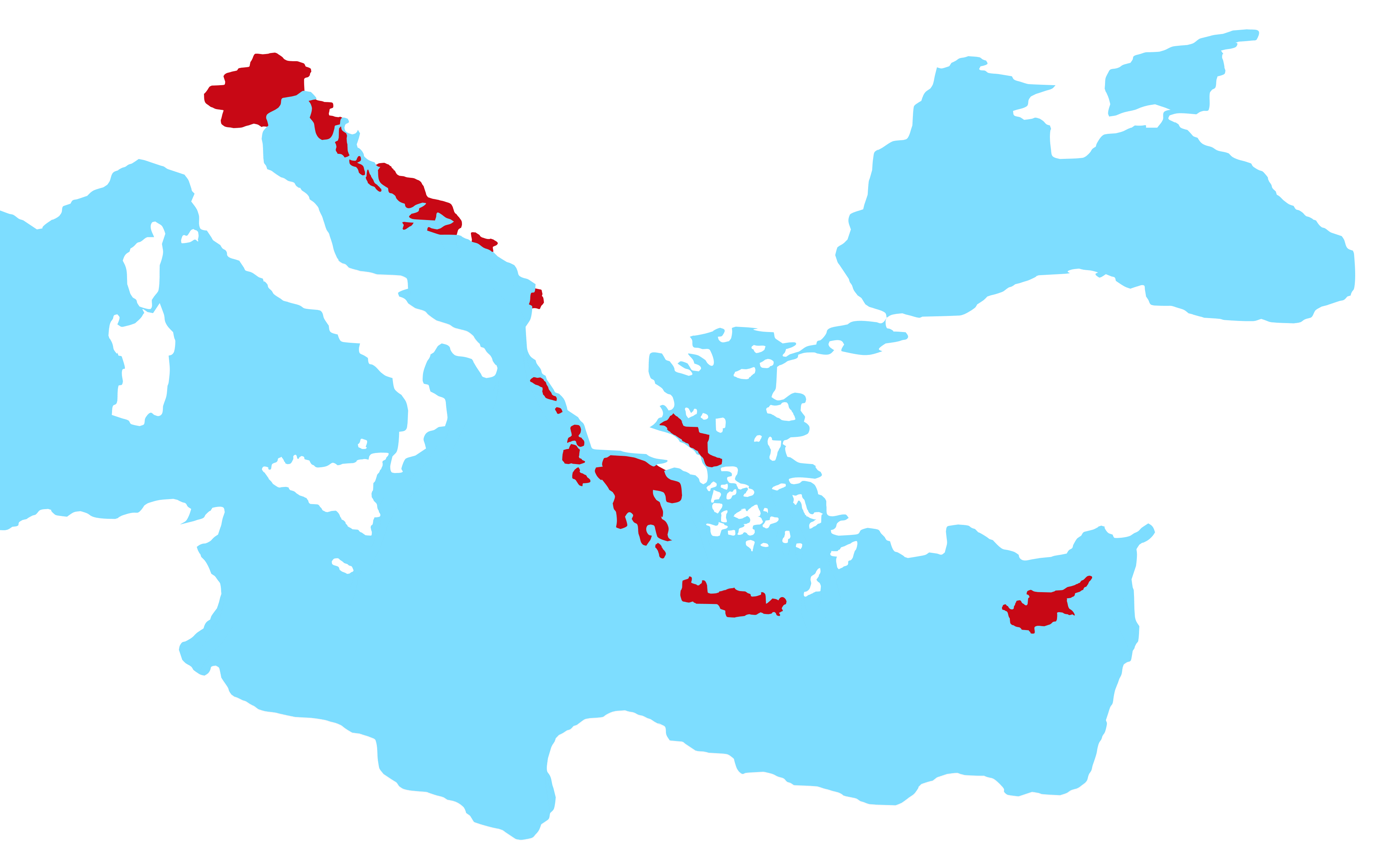
The Republic of Venice with its Terraferma and Stato da Màr

From the 9th to the 12th centuries, Venice developed into a powerful maritime empire (an Italian thalassocracy known also as repubblica marinara). In addition to Venice there were seven other maritime republics: the most important ones were Genoa, Pisa, and Amalfi; and the lesser known were Ragusa, Ancona, Gaeta and Noli. Its own strategic position at the head of the Adriatic made Venetian naval and commercial power almost invulnerable. The Republic's embrace of sound monetary policies, especially its reliable gold ducat, underpinned growing confidence in Venetian trade and finance, further strengthening its position in international commerce. With the elimination of pirates along the Dalmatian coast, the city became a flourishing trade centre between Western Europe and the rest of the world, especially with the Byzantine Empire and Asia, where its navy protected sea routes against piracy.

The Republic of Venice seized a number of places on the eastern shores of the Adriatic before 1200, mostly for commercial reasons, because pirates based there were a menace to trade. The doge already possessed the titles of Duke of Dalmatia and Duke of Istria. Later mainland possessions, which extended across Lake Garda as far west as the Adda River, were known as the Terraferma; they were acquired partly as a buffer against belligerent neighbors, partly to guarantee Alpine trade routes, and partly to ensure the supply of mainland wheat (on which the city depended). In building its maritime commercial empire, Venice dominated the trade in salt, acquired control of most of the islands in the Aegean, including Crete, and Cyprus in the Mediterranean, and became a major power-broker in the Near East. By the standards of the time, Venice's stewardship of its mainland territories was relatively enlightened and the citizens of such towns as Bergamo, Brescia, and Verona rallied to the defence of Venetian sovereignty when it was threatened by invaders.

Venice remained closely associated with Constantinople, being twice granted trading privileges in the Eastern Roman Empire, through the so-called golden bulls, or "chrysobulls", in return for aiding the Eastern Empire in resisting Norman and Turkish incursions. In the first chrysobull, Venice acknowledged its homage to the empire, but not in the second, reflecting the decline of Byzantium and the rise of Venice's power.

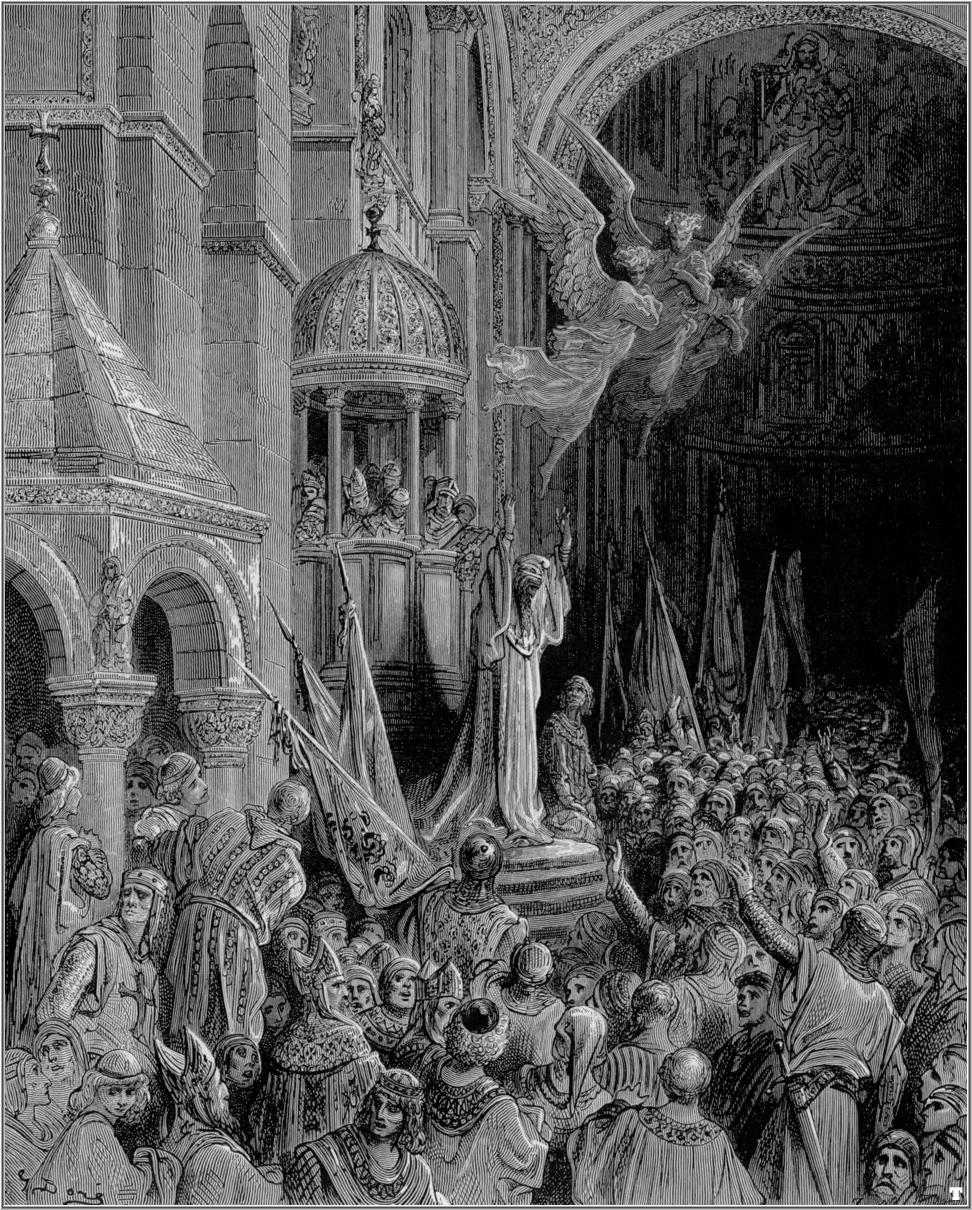
Doge Enrico Dandolo advocating for the Crusade

Venice became an imperial power following the Fourth Crusade, which, having veered off course, culminated in 1204 by the capture and sacking of Constantinople and the establishment of the Latin Empire. As a result of this conquest, considerable Byzantine plunder was brought back to Venice. This plunder included the gilt bronze horses from the Hippodrome of Constantinople, which were originally placed above the entrance to the cathedral of Venice, St. Mark's Basilica (the originals have been replaced with replicas, and are now stored within the basilica.) After the fall of Constantinople, the former Eastern Roman Empire was partitioned among the Latin crusaders and the Venetians. Venice subsequently carved out a sphere of influence in the Mediterranean known as the Duchy of the Archipelago, and captured Crete.

The seizure of Constantinople proved as decisive a factor in ending the Byzantine Empire as the loss of the Anatolian themes, after Manzikert. Although the Byzantines recovered control of the ravaged city a half-century later, the Byzantine Empire was terminally weakened, and existed only as a ghost of its former self, until Sultan Mehmet The Conqueror took the city in 1453.

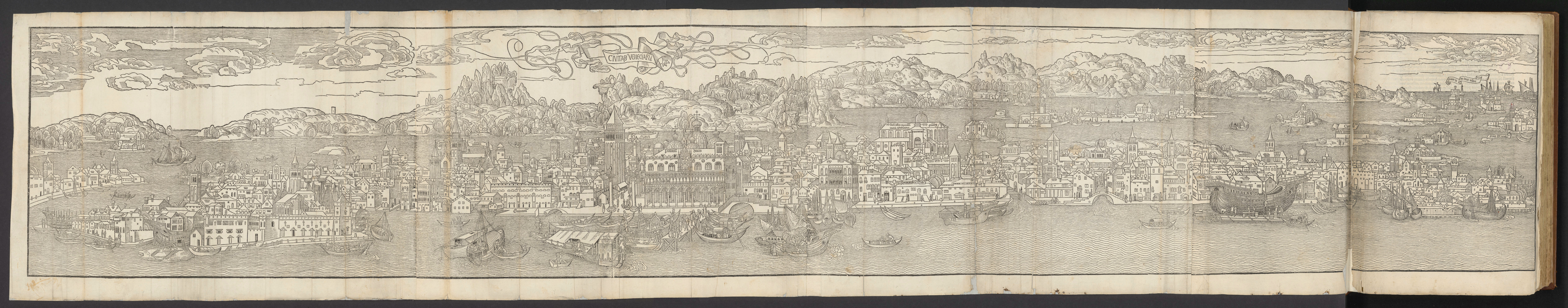
Venice veduta by Erhard Reuwich for the Peregrinationes in terram sanctam, Mainz 1486

Situated on the Adriatic Sea, Venice had always enjoyed a strong trade relationship with the Byzantine Empire and the Middle East. By the late 13th century, Venice was the most prosperous city in all of Europe. At the peak of its power and wealth, it had 36,000 sailors operating 3,300 ships, dominating Mediterranean commerce. Venice's leading families vied with each other to build the grandest palaces and to support the work of the greatest and most talented artists. The city was governed by the Great Council, which was made up of members of the noble families of Venice. The Great Council appointed all public officials, and elected a Senate of 200–300 individuals. Since this group was too large for efficient administration, a Council of Ten (also called the Ducal Council, or the Signoria), controlled much of the city administration. One member of the great council was elected "doge", or duke, to be the chief executive; he would usually hold the title until his death, although several doges were pressured by their oligarchical peers to resign and retire into monastic seclusion, when they were felt to have been discredited by political failure.

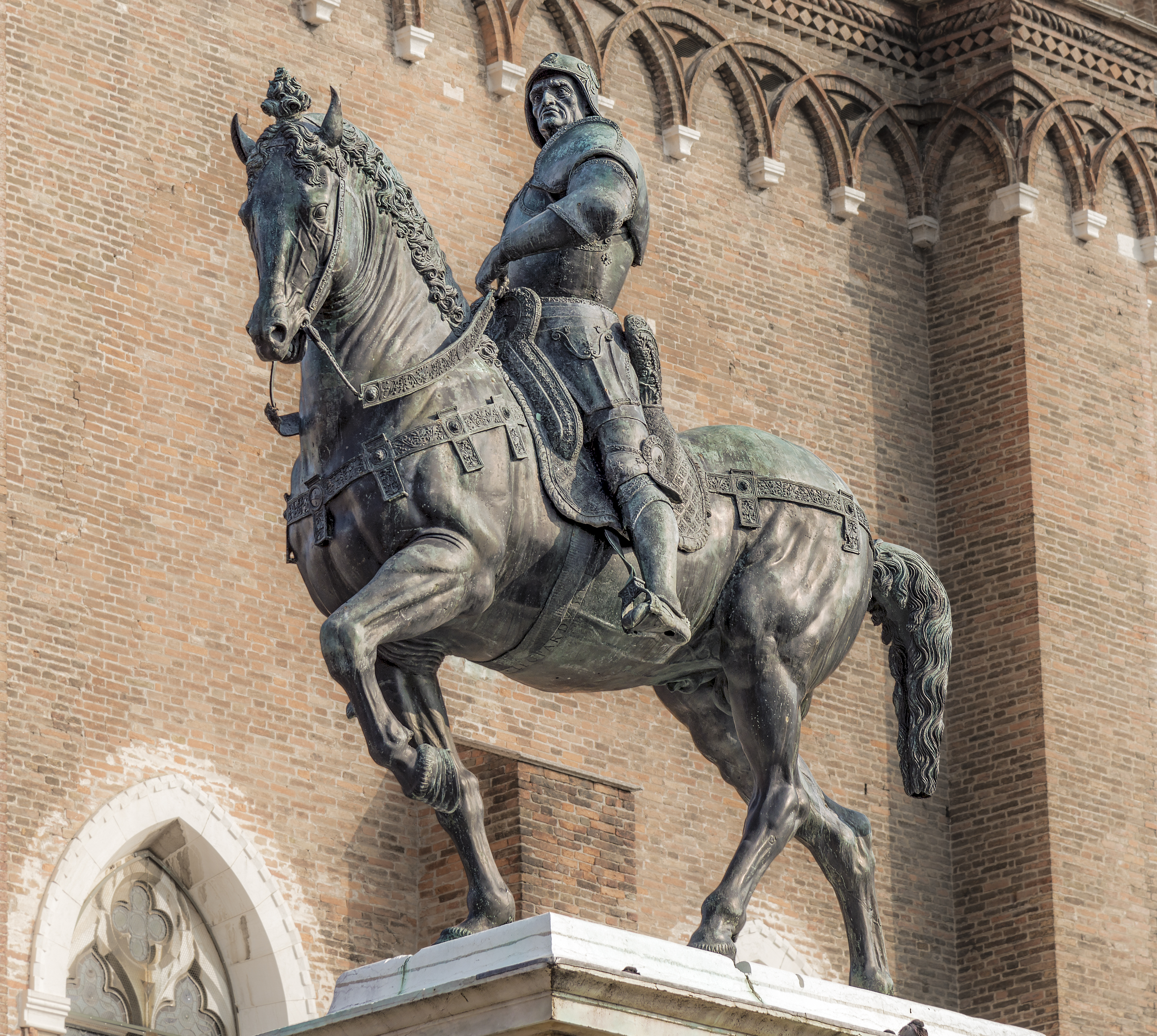
Statue of Bartolomeo Colleoni (1400–1475), a prominent Italian condottiero who served as captain-general of the Republic of Venice between 1455 and 1475

The Venetian governmental structure was similar in some ways to the republican system of ancient Rome, with an elected chief executive (the Doge), a senate-like assembly of nobles, and the general citizenry with limited political power who originally had the power to grant or withhold their approval of each newly elected Doge. Church and various private property were tied to military service, although there was no knight tenure within the city itself. The Cavalieri di San Marco was the only order of chivalry ever instituted in Venice, and no citizen could accept or join a foreign order without the government's consent. Venice remained a republic throughout its independent period, and politics and the military were kept separate, except when on occasion the Doge personally headed the military. War was regarded as a continuation of commerce by other means. This tradition justified the city's early employment of large numbers of mercenaries for service elsewhere, and later its reliance on foreign mercenaries when the ruling class was preoccupied with commerce.

Although the people of Venice generally remained orthodox Roman Catholics, the state of Venice was notable for its freedom from religious fanaticism, and executed nobody for religious heresy during the Counter-Reformation. This apparent lack of zeal contributed to Venice's frequent conflicts with the papacy. In this context, the writings of the Anglican divine William Bedell are particularly illuminating. Venice was threatened with the interdict on a number of occasions and twice suffered its imposition. The second, most noted, occasion was in 1606, by order of Pope Paul V.

The newly invented German printing press spread rapidly throughout Europe in the 15th century, and Venice was quick to adopt it. By 1482, Venice was the printing capital of the world; the leading printer was Aldus Manutius, who invented paperback books that could be carried in a saddlebag. His Aldine Editions included translations of nearly all the known Greek manuscripts of the era.

=== Decline ===
Venice's long decline started in the 15th century. Venice confronted the Ottoman Empire in the Siege of Thessalonica (1422–1430) and sent ships to help defend Constantinople against the besieging Turks in 1453. After the Fall of Constantinople, Sultan Mehmed II declared the first of a series of Ottoman-Venetian wars that cost Venice many of its eastern Mediterranean possessions. Vasco da Gama's 1497–1499 voyage, which opened a sea route to India around the Cape of Good Hope, destroyed Venice's monopoly. Venice's oared vessels were at a disadvantage when it came to traversing oceans; therefore, Venice was left behind in the race for colonies.

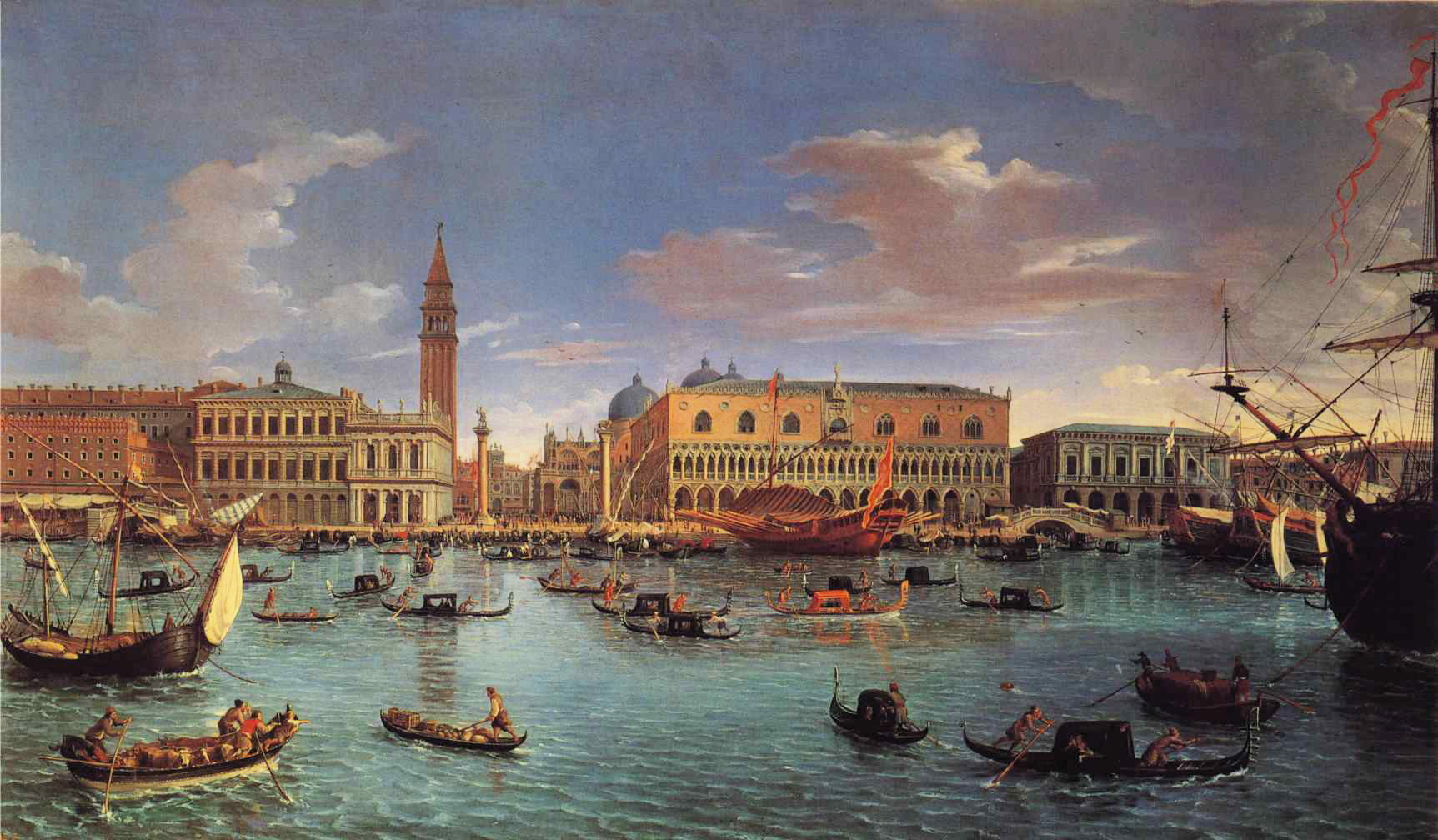
View of San Marco basin in 1697

The Black Death devastated Venice in 1348 and struck again between 1575 and 1577. In three years, the plague killed some 50,000 people. In 1630, the Italian plague of 1629–31 killed a third of Venice's 150,000 citizens.

Venice began to lose its position as a centre of international trade during the later part of the Renaissance as Portugal became Europe's principal intermediary in the trade with the East, striking at the very foundation of Venice's great wealth. France and Spain fought for hegemony over Italy in the Italian Wars, marginalising its political influence. However, Venice remained a major exporter of agricultural products and, until the mid-18th century, a significant manufacturing centre.

=== Modern age ===
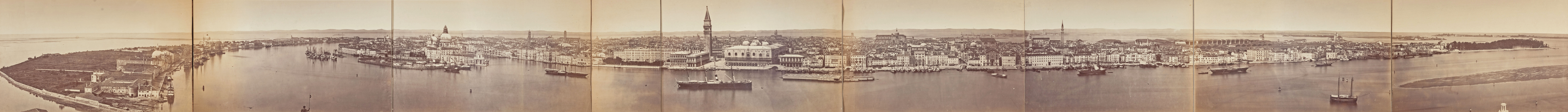
1870s panoramic view of Venice

The Republic of Venice lost its independence when Napoleon Bonaparte conquered Venice on 12 May 1797 during the War of the First Coalition. Napoleon was seen as something of a liberator by the city's Jewish population. He removed the gates of the Ghetto and ended the restrictions on when and where Jews could live and travel within the city.

Venice became Austrian territory when Napoleon signed the Treaty of Campo Formio on 12 October 1797. The Austrians took control of the city on 18 January 1798. Venice was taken from Austria by the Treaty of Pressburg in 1805 and became part of Napoleon's Kingdom of Italy. It was returned to Austria following Napoleon's defeat in 1814, when it became part of the Austrian-held Kingdom of Lombardy–Venetia. In 1848, a revolt briefly re-established the Venetian republic under Daniele Manin, but this was crushed in 1849. In 1866, after the Third Italian War of Independence, Venice, along with the rest of the Veneto, became part of the newly created Kingdom of Italy.

From the middle of the 18th century, Trieste and papal Ancona, both of which became free ports, competed with Venice more and more economically. Habsburg Trieste in particular boomed and increasingly served trade via the Suez Canal, which opened in 1869, between Asia and Central Europe, while Venice very quickly lost its competitive edge and commercial strength.

During World War II, the historic city was largely free from attack, with the only aggressive effort of note being Operation Bowler, a successful Royal Air Force precision strike on the German naval operations in the city in March 1945. The targets were destroyed with virtually no architectural damage inflicted upon the city itself. However, the industrial areas in Mestre and Marghera and the railway lines to Padua, Trieste, and Trento were repeatedly bombed. On 29 April 1945, a force of British and New Zealand troops of the British Eighth Army, under Lieutenant General Freyberg, liberated Venice, which had been a hotbed of anti-Mussolini Italian partisan activity.

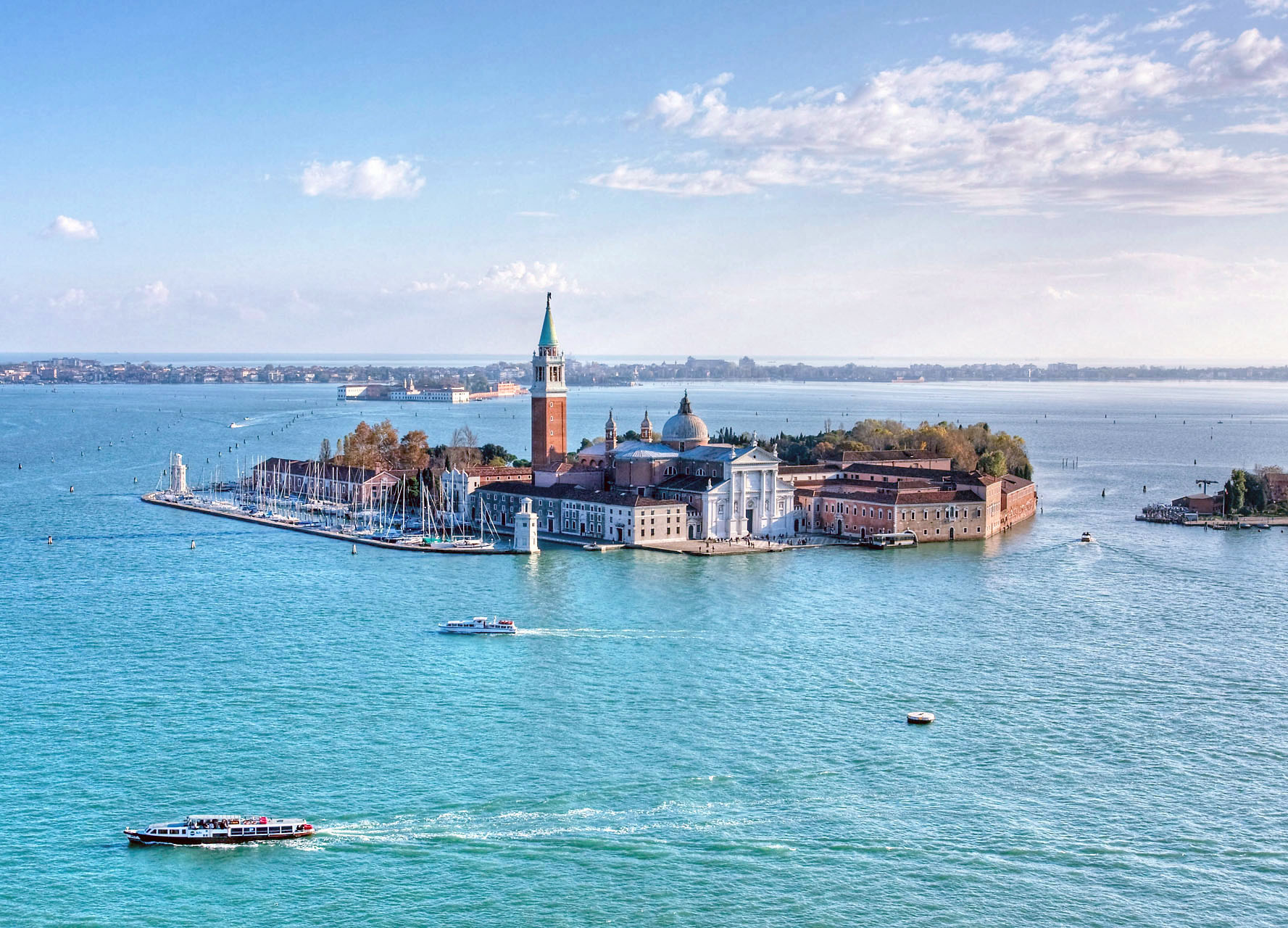
View of San Giorgio Maggiore from St. Mark's Campanile

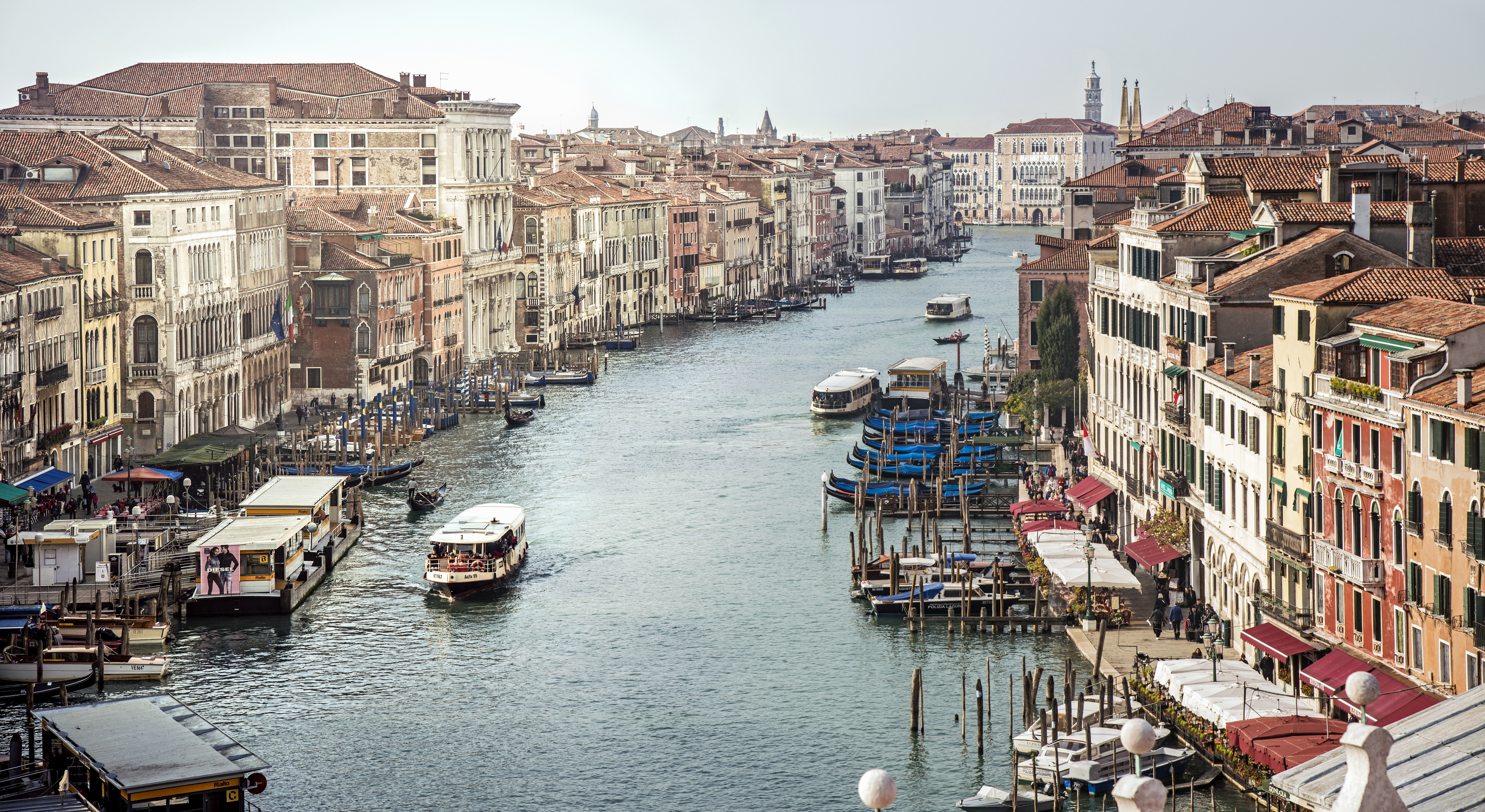
Grand Canal from Rialto to Ca' Foscari (2016)

Venice was listed as a UNESCO World Heritage Site in 1987, inscribing it as "Venice and its Lagoon".

== Geography ==
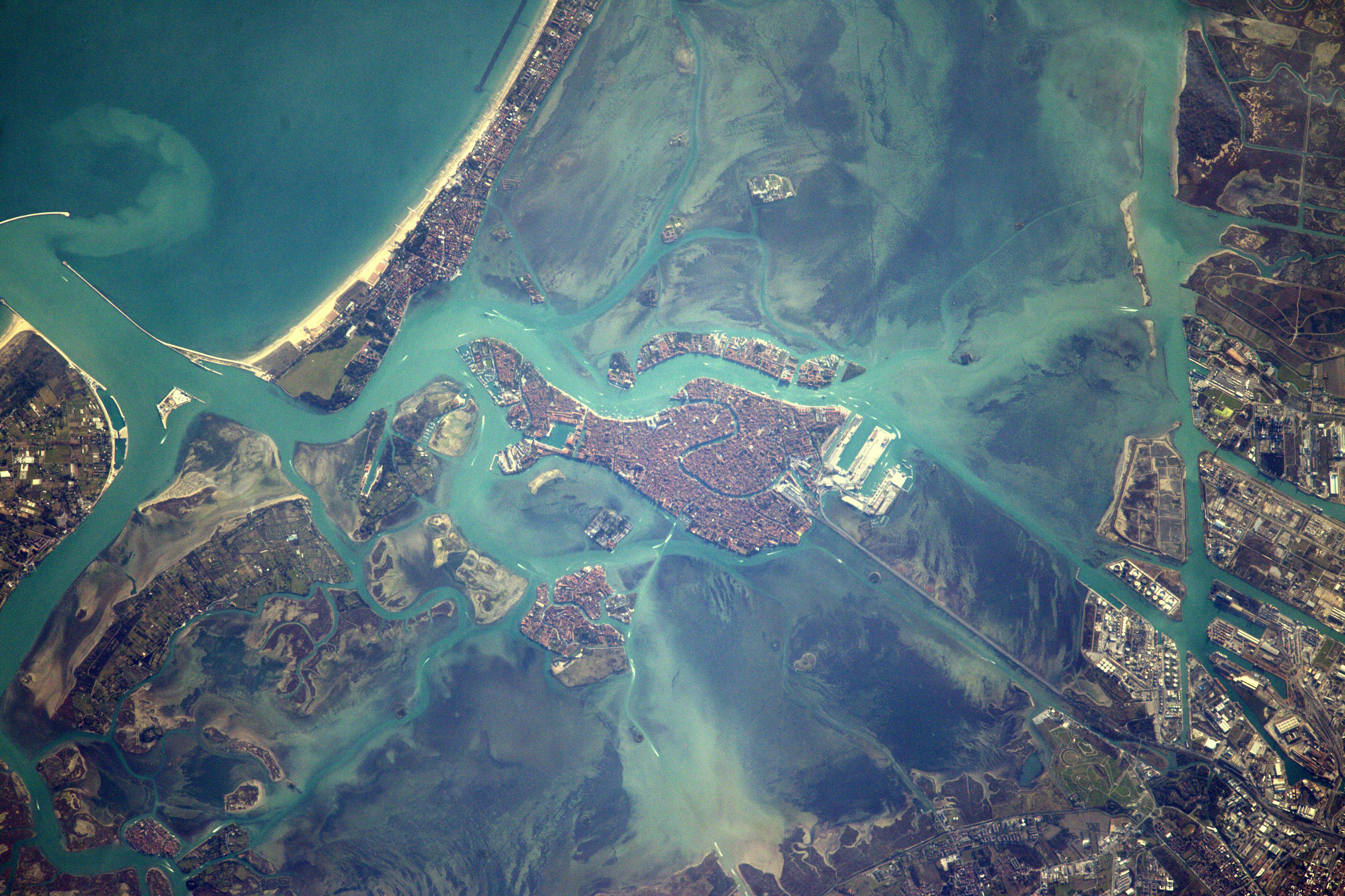
Venice viewed from the International Space Station

Venice is located in northeastern Italy, in the Veneto region. The city is situated on a group of 118 small islands that are separated by canals and linked by 438 bridges. The historic center of Venice is divided into six districts, or sestieri, which are named Cannaregio, Castello, Dorsoduro, San Marco, San Polo, and Santa Croce.

Venice sits atop alluvial silt washed into the sea by the rivers flowing eastward from the Alps across the Veneto plain, with the silt being stretched into long banks, or lidi, by the action of the current flowing around the head of the Adriatic Sea from east to west.

=== Subsidence ===
Subsidence, the gradual lowering of the surface of Venice, has contributed – along with other factors – to the seasonal Acqua alta ("high water"), when the city's lowest lying surfaces may be covered at high tide.

==== Building foundations ====
Those fleeing barbarian invasions who found refuge on the sandy islands of Torcello, Iesolo, and Malamocco, in this coastal lagoon, learned to build by driving closely spaced piles consisting of the trunks of alder trees, a wood noted for its water resistance, into the mud and sand, until they reached a much harder layer of compressed clay. Building foundations rested on plates of Istrian limestone placed on top of the piles.

==== Flooding and sea-level rise ====
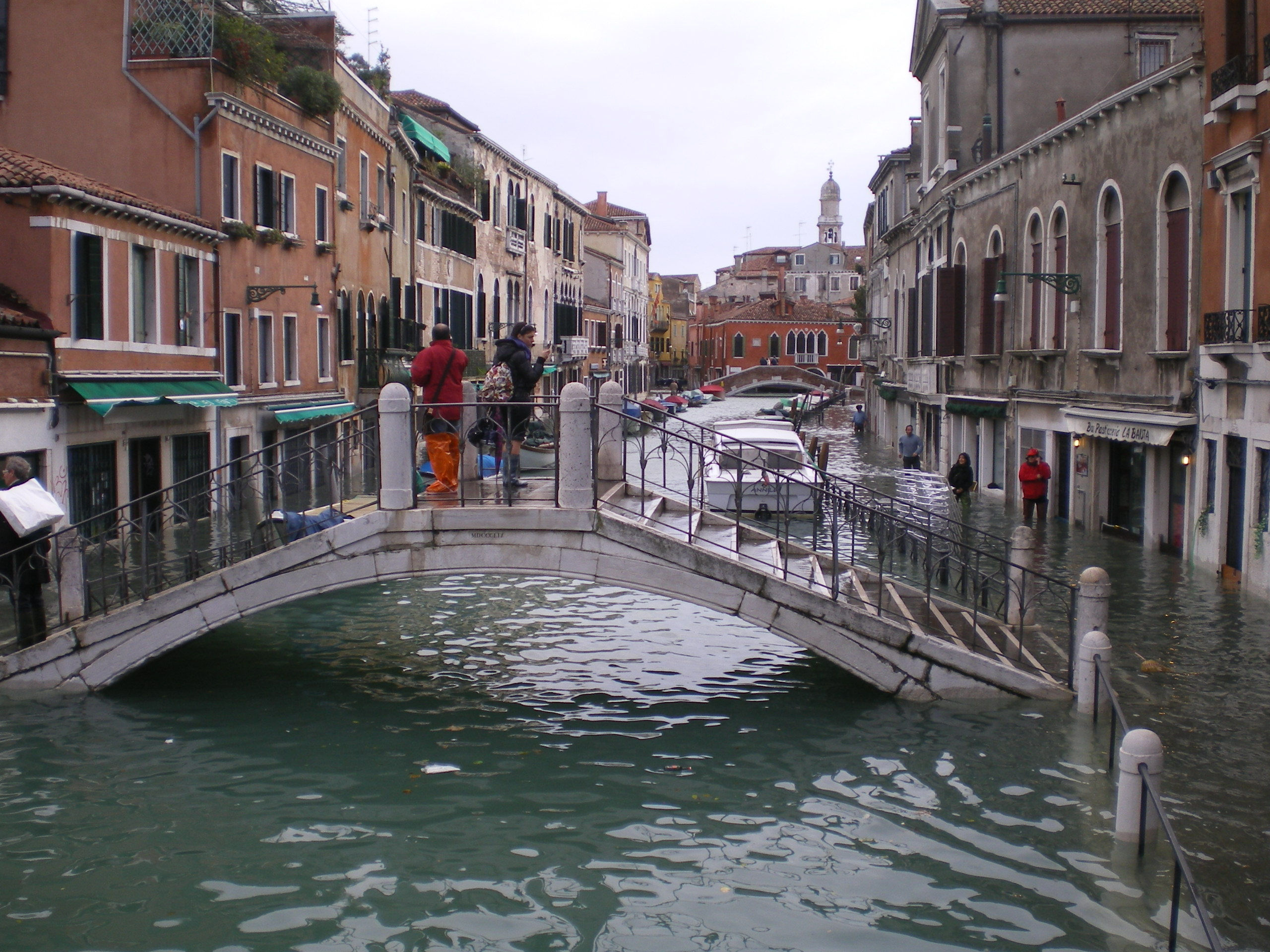
Acqua alta ("high water") in Venice, 2008

Between autumn and early spring, the city is often threatened by flood tides pushing in from the Adriatic. Six hundred years ago, Venetians protected themselves from land-based attacks by diverting all the major rivers flowing into the lagoon, preventing sediment from filling the area around the city. This created an ever-deeper lagoon environment. Additionally, the lowest part of Venice, St. Mark's Basilica, is only 64 centimetres (25 in) above sea level, and one of the most flood-prone parts of the city.

In 1604, to defray the cost of flood relief, Venice introduced what could be considered the first example of a stamp tax. When the revenue fell short of expectations in 1608, Venice introduced paper, with the superscription "AQ" and imprinted instructions, which was to be used for "letters to officials." At first, this was to be a temporary tax, but it remained in effect until the fall of the Republic in 1797. Shortly after the introduction of the tax, Spain produced similar paper for general taxation purposes, and the practice spread to other countries.

During the 20th century, when many artesian wells were sunk into the periphery of the lagoon to draw water for local industry, Venice began to subside. It was realized that extraction of water from the aquifer was the cause. The sinking has slowed markedly since artesian wells were banned in the 1960s. However, the city is still threatened by more frequent low-level floods – the Acqua alta — that rise to a height of several centimetres over its quays – regularly following certain tides. In many old houses, staircases once used to unload goods are now flooded, rendering the former ground floor uninhabitable.

Studies indicate that the city continues sinking at a relatively slow rate of 1–2 mm. per year; therefore, the state of alert has not been revoked.

In May 2003, Italian Prime Minister Silvio Berlusconi inaugurated the MOSE Project (Italian: Modulo Sperimentale Elettromeccanico), an experimental model for evaluating the performance of hollow floatable gates, expected to be completed by the end of 2025; the idea is to fix a series of 78 hollow pontoons to the sea bed across the three entrances to the lagoon. When tides are predicted to rise above 110 centimetres (43 in), the pontoons will be filled with air, causing them to float on lagoon side while hinged at sea floor on seaside, thus blocking the incoming water from the Adriatic Sea. This engineering work was due to be completed by 2018. A Reuters report stated that the MOSE Project attributed the delay to "corruption scandals". The project is not guaranteed to be successful and the cost has been very high, with as much as approximately €2 billion of the cost lost to corruption.

According to a spokesman for the National Trust of Italy (Fondo Ambiente Italiano):

MOSE is a pharaonic project that should have cost €800m [£675m] but will cost at least €7bn [£6bn]. If the barriers are closed at only 90 cm of high water, most of St. Mark's will be flooded anyway; but if closed at very high levels only, then people will wonder at the logic of spending such sums on something that didn't solve the problem. And pressure will come from the cruise ships to keep the gates open.

On 13 November 2019, Venice was flooded when waters peaked at 1.87 m (6 ft), the highest tide since 1966 (1.94 m; 6 ft). More than 80% of the city was covered by water, which damaged cultural heritage sites, including more than 50 churches, leading to tourists cancelling their visits. The planned flood barrier would have prevented this incident according to various sources, including Marco Piana, the head of conservation at St. Mark's Basilica. The mayor promised that work on the flood barrier would continue, and the Prime Minister announced that the government would be accelerating the project.

The city's mayor, Luigi Brugnaro, blamed the floods on climate change. The chambers of the Regional Council of Veneto began to flood around 10 p.m. — two minutes after the council rejected a plan to combat global warming. One of the effects of climate change is sea-level rise which causes an increase in frequency and magnitude of floodings in the city. A Washington Post report provided a more thorough analysis:

"The sea level has been rising even more rapidly in Venice than in other parts of the world. At the same time, the city is sinking, the result of tectonic plates shifting below the Italian coast. Those factors together, along with the more frequent extreme weather events associated with climate change, contribute to floods."

Henk Ovink, an expert on flooding, told CNN that, while environmental factors are part of the problem, "historic floods in Venice are not only a result of the climate crisis, but poor infrastructure and mismanagement".

The government of Italy committed to providing €20m in funding to help the city repair the most critical damages, although Brugnaro's estimate of the total damage was "hundreds of millions" to at least 1 billion euros.

On 3 October 2020, MOSE was activated for the first time in response to a predicted high-tide event, preventing some of the low-lying parts of the city (in particular the Piazza San Marco) from being flooded.

=== Climate ===
According to the Köppen climate classification, Venice has a mid-latitude, four-season humid subtropical climate (Cfa), with cool, damp winters and warm, humid summers. The 24-hour average temperature in January is 3.8 °C (38.8 °F), and for July this figure is 23.8 °C (74.8 °F). Precipitation is spread relatively evenly throughout the year, and averages 748 millimetres (29.4 in); snow is not uncommon between late November and early March. During the most severe winters, the canals and parts of the lagoon can freeze, but with the warming trend of the past 30–40 years, the occurrence has become rarer.

Climate data for Venice, elevation: 2 m or 6 ft 7 in, (1991–2020 normals, extremes 1836–present)
Month	Jan	Feb	Mar	Apr	May	Jun	Jul	Aug	Sep	Oct	Nov	Dec	Year
Record high °C (°F)	17.0 (62.6)	22.0 (71.6)	25.3 (77.5)	27.2 (81.0)	31.5 (88.7)	35.2 (95.4)	36.6 (97.9)	36.5 (97.7)	32.4 (90.3)	27.3 (81.1)	23.0 (73.4)	16.7 (62.1)	36.6 (97.9)
Mean maximum °C (°F)	13.6 (56.5)	15.8 (60.4)	19.8 (67.6)	23.4 (74.1)	28.1 (82.6)	31.8 (89.2)	33.6 (92.5)	33.5 (92.3)	29.8 (85.6)	24.5 (76.1)	18.2 (64.8)	13.9 (57.0)	34.7 (94.5)
Mean daily maximum °C (°F)	7.5 (45.5)	9.2 (48.6)	13.2 (55.8)	17.4 (63.3)	22.0 (71.6)	26.0 (78.8)	28.5 (83.3)	28.4 (83.1)	23.8 (74.8)	18.5 (65.3)	12.9 (55.2)	8.3 (46.9)	18.0 (64.4)
Daily mean °C (°F)	3.8 (38.8)	5.0 (41.0)	8.9 (48.0)	13.0 (55.4)	17.7 (63.9)	21.7 (71.1)	23.8 (74.8)	23.7 (74.7)	19.3 (66.7)	14.5 (58.1)	9.3 (48.7)	4.7 (40.5)	13.8 (56.8)
Mean daily minimum °C (°F)	0.1 (32.2)	0.8 (33.4)	4.5 (40.1)	8.7 (47.7)	13.5 (56.3)	17.4 (63.3)	19.2 (66.6)	18.9 (66.0)	14.8 (58.6)	10.5 (50.9)	5.7 (42.3)	1.0 (33.8)	9.6 (49.3)
Mean minimum °C (°F)	−5.1 (22.8)	−4.2 (24.4)	−1.6 (29.1)	2.3 (36.1)	7.0 (44.6)	11.4 (52.5)	14.1 (57.4)	13.9 (57.0)	9.6 (49.3)	4.5 (40.1)	−0.4 (31.3)	−3.8 (25.2)	−6.5 (20.3)
Record low °C (°F)	−13.5 (7.7)	−13.0 (8.6)	−7.4 (18.7)	−0.8 (30.6)	2.0 (35.6)	7.0 (44.6)	10.2 (50.4)	10.0 (50.0)	5.0 (41.0)	−1.1 (30.0)	−8.8 (16.2)	−12.5 (9.5)	−13.5 (7.7)
Average precipitation mm (inches)	40.2 (1.58)	56.5 (2.22)	60.5 (2.38)	70.5 (2.78)	80.2 (3.16)	64.2 (2.53)	57.9 (2.28)	65.8 (2.59)	73.3 (2.89)	72.0 (2.83)	71.5 (2.81)	49.8 (1.96)	762.4 (30.01)
Average precipitation days	6.0	5.2	5.7	8.3	8.2	8.6	5.9	6.1	5.9	6.7	5.8	5.9	78.3
Average relative humidity (%)	81	77	75	75	73	74	71	72	75	77	79	81	76
Mean monthly sunshine hours	80.6	107.4	142.6	174.0	229.4	243.0	288.3	257.3	198.0	151.9	87.0	77.5	2,037
Mean daily sunshine hours	2.6	3.8	4.6	5.8	7.4	8.1	9.3	8.3	6.6	4.9	2.9	2.5	5.6
Mean daily daylight hours	9.2	10.4	12.0	13.6	14.9	15.6	15.3	14.1	12.5	10.9	9.5	8.8	12.2
Percentage possible sunshine	29	38	38	41	49	51	62	59	51	45	29	28	43
Average ultraviolet index	1	2	3	5	7	8	8	7	5	3	2	1	4
Source 1: Istituto Superiore per la Protezione e la Ricerca AmbientaleNOAA
Source 2: MeteoAM (sun and humidity 1961–1990), Weather Atlas (daylight, UV) Temperature estreme in Toscana (extremes)

Climate data for Venice (sea temperatures)
Month	Jan	Feb	Mar	Apr	May	Jun	Jul	Aug	Sep	Oct	Nov	Dec	Year
Daily mean °C (°F)	10.0 (50.0)	8.8 (47.8)	9.9 (49.8)	13.4 (56.1)	18.6 (65.5)	23.4 (74.1)	25.4 (77.7)	25.4 (77.7)	23.6 (74.5)	19.3 (66.7)	16.0 (60.8)	13.3 (55.9)	17.3 (63.0)
Source: Weather Atlas

== Demographics ==
Historical population
Year	Pop.	±%
1871	164,965	—
1881	165,802	+0.5%
1901	189,368	+14.2%
1911	208,463	+10.1%
1921	223,373	+7.2%
1931	250,327	+12.1%
1936	264,027	+5.5%
1951	310,034	+17.4%
1961	339,671	+9.6%
1971	354,475	+4.4%
1981	336,081	−5.2%
1991	298,532	−11.2%
2001	271,073	−9.2%
2011	261,362	−3.6%
2021	251,944	−3.6%
Source: ISTAT

The city was one of the largest in Europe in the High Middle Ages, with a population of 60,000 in AD 1000; 80,000 in 1200; and rising up to 110,000–180,000 in 1300. In the mid-1500s, the city's population was 170,000, and by 1600 it approached 200,000.

As of 2026, the population is 249,385, of which 48.7% are males, and 51.3% are females. Minors make up 13.0% of the population, and seniors make up 28.7%.

In 2021, the municipality had a population of 254,850, of which 50,434 was in the historic city of Venice (Centro storico); 177,621 in Terraferma (the mainland); and 26,795 on other islands in the lagoon.

Many locals are leaving the historic centre due to rapidly increasing rents. The declining native population affects the character of the city, as an October 2016 National Geographic article pointed out in its subtitle: "Residents are abandoning the city, which is in danger of becoming an overpriced theme park." The city is also facing other challenges, including erosion, pollution, subsidence, an excessive number of tourists during peak periods, and problems caused by oversized cruise ships sailing too close to the banks of the historic city.

=== Immigration ===
As of 2025, immigrants make up 18.5% of the population. The 5 largest foreign countries of birth are Bangladesh, Moldova, China, Ukraine, and Romania.

Foreign-born population (2025)
Country of birth	Population
Bangladesh	9,485
Moldova	6,808
China	3,026
Ukraine	2,745
Romania	2,731
Albania	2,113
North Macedonia	1,415
Philippines	1,322
Kosovo	975
Brazil	658
Sri Lanka	654
Morocco	649
France	634
Russia	634
Senegal	631

=== Religion ===
Venice is predominantly Roman Catholic (85.0% of the resident population in the area of the Patriarchate of Venice in 2022), but because of the long-standing relationship with Constantinople, there is also a noticeable Orthodox presence; and, as a result of immigration, there is now a Muslim community (about 18,000, or 7.2%, of city population in 2025), and some Hindu and Buddhist inhabitants.

Since 1991, the Church of San Giorgio dei Greci in Venice has become the see of the Greek Orthodox Archdiocese of Italy and Malta and Exarchate of Southern Europe, a Byzantine-rite diocese under the Ecumenical Patriarchate of Constantinople.

=== Jewish population ===
There is also a historic Jewish community in Venice. The Venetian Ghetto was the area in which Jews were compelled to live under the Venetian Republic. The word ghetto (ghèto), originally Venetian, is now found in many languages. Shakespeare's play The Merchant of Venice, written in the late 16th century, features Shylock, a Venetian Jew. The first complete and uncensored printed edition of the Talmud was printed in Venice by Daniel Bomberg in 1523. During World War II, Jews were rounded up in Venice and deported to extermination camps. Since the end of the war, the Jewish population of Venice has declined from 1,500 to about 500. Only around 30 Jews live in the former ghetto, which houses the city's major Jewish institutions. In modern times, Venice has an eruv, used by the Jewish community.

== Government ==
=== Local and regional government ===
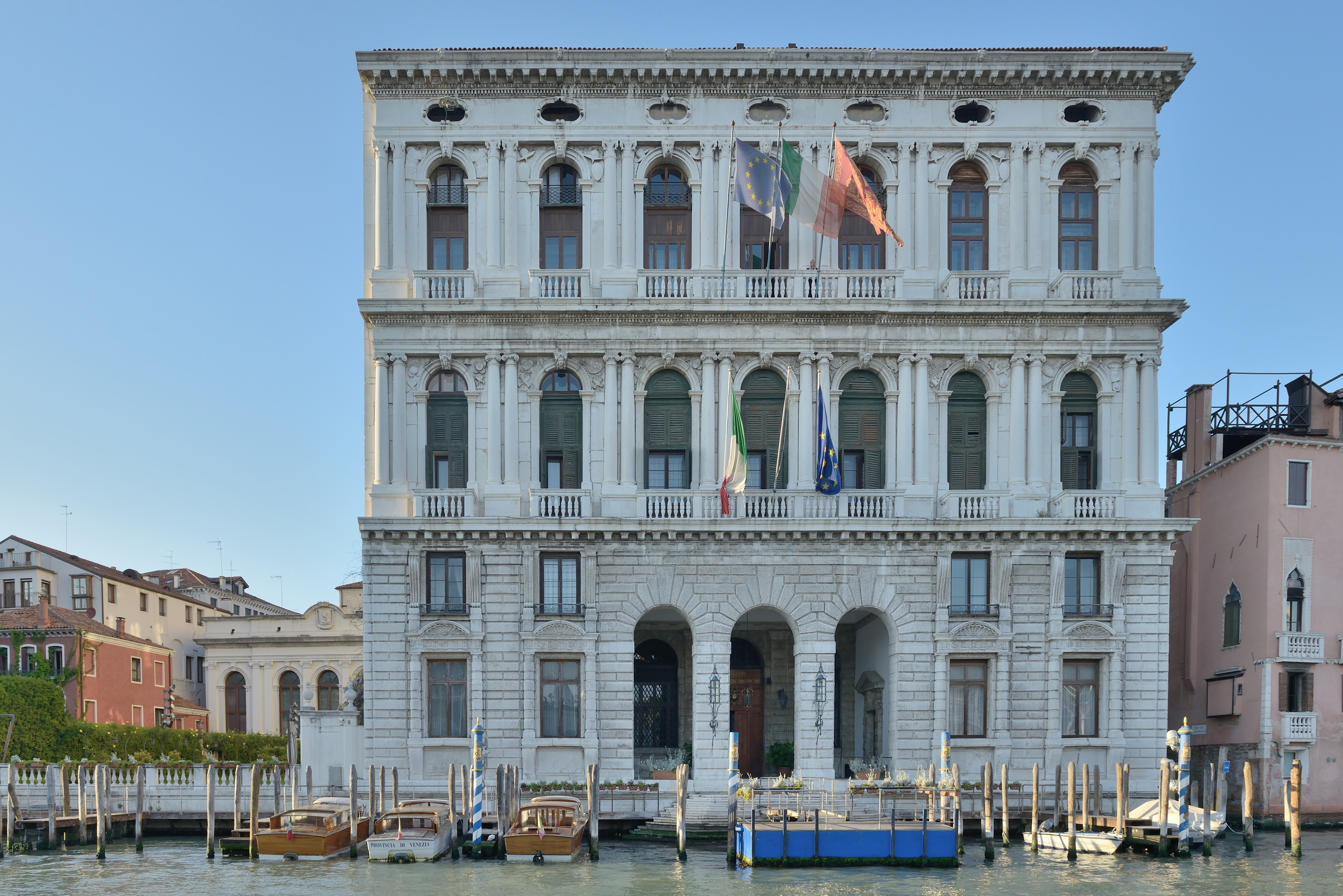
Palazzo Corner is the seat of the Metropolitan City of Venice.

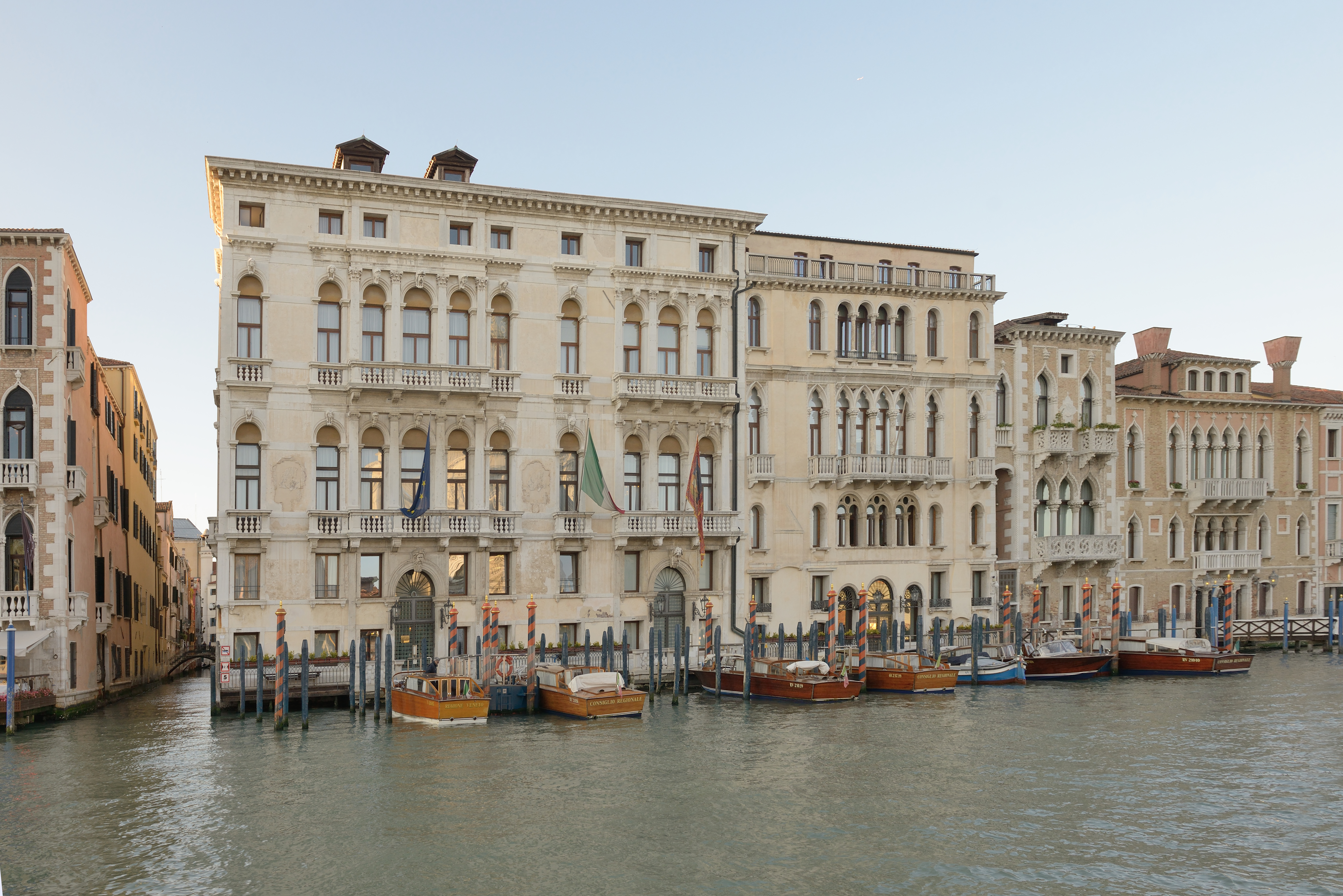
Palazzo Ferro Fini is the seat of the Regional Council of Veneto.

The legislative body of the municipality is the City Council (Consiglio Comunale), which is composed of 36 councillors elected every five years with a proportional system, contextually, to the mayoral elections. The executive body is the City Administration (Giunta Comunale), composed of 12 assessors nominated and presided over by a directly elected Mayor.

Venice was governed by centre-left parties from the early 1990s until the 2010s, when the Mayor started to be elected directly. Its region, Veneto, has long been a conservative stronghold, with the coalition between the regionalist Lega Nord and the centre-right Forza Italia winning absolute majorities of the electorate in many elections at local, national, and regional levels. In the most recent elections, centre-left is usually dominant within the centro storico, whereas other boroughs have a more right lean.

The current mayor of Venice is Simone Venturini, a centre-right independent who is currently serving his first term in office.

The municipality of Venice is subdivided into six administrative boroughs (municipalità). Each borough is governed by a council (Consiglio) and a president, elected every five years. The urban organization is dictated by Article 114 of the Italian Constitution. The boroughs have the power to advise the Mayor with nonbinding opinions on an array of topics, to include the environment, construction, public health, and local markets, and exercise the functions delegated to them by the City Council; in addition, they are supplied with autonomous funding to finance local activities.

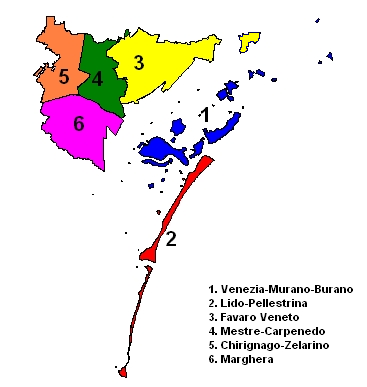
Boroughs: Venezia (Historic city)–Murano–Burano Lido–Pellestrina Favaro Veneto Mestre–Carpenedo Chirignago–Zelarino Marghera

Boroughs
	Borough	Place	Population	President	Party	Term
1	Venezia (Historic city)–Murano–Burano	Lagoon area	69,136	Giovanni Pelizzato	PD	2026–2031
2	Lido–Pellestrina	Lagoon area	21,664	Marina Faraguna	FdI	2026–2031
3	Favaro Veneto	Mainland (terraferma)	23,615	Alex Bazzaro	Lega	2026–2031
4	Mestre–Carpenedo	Mainland (terraferma)	88,592	Gennaro Marotta	Ind	2026–2031
5	Chirignago–Zelarino	Mainland (terraferma)	38,179	Francesco Tagliapietra	Ind	2026–2031
6	Marghera	Mainland (terraferma)	28,466	Teodoro Marolo	Ind	2026–2031

=== Sestieri ===
Historically, the city of Venice has been divided into six sestieri, and is made up of a total of 127 individual islands, most of which are separated from their neighbors by narrow channels.

Sestieri: Cannaregio Castello San Marco Dorsoduro San Polo Santa Croce

Sestiere
Sestiere	Abbr.	Pop. (2011-10-09)	Area (ha)	Density	No. of islands
Cannaregio	CN	16,950	121.36	13,967	33
Castello	CS	14,813	173.97	8,514	26
San Marco	SM	4,145	54.48	7,552	16
Dorsoduro	DD	13,398	161.32	8,305	31
San Polo	SP	9,183	46.70	19,665	7
Santa Croce	SC	2,257	88.57	2,548	14
Historic centre	—N/a	60,746	646.80	9,392	127

Each sestiere is now a statistical and historical area without any degree of autonomy.

The six fingers, or phalanges, of the ferro on the bow of a gondola represent the six sestieri.

The sestieri are divided into parishes—initially 70 in 1033, but reduced under Napoleon, and now numbering just 38. These parishes predate the sestieri, which were created in about 1170. Each parish exhibited unique characteristics but also belonged to an integrated network. Each community chose its own patron saint, staged its own festivals, congregated around its own market centre, constructed its own bell towers, and developed its own customs.

Other islands of the Venetian Lagoon do not form part of any of the sestieri, having historically enjoyed a considerable degree of autonomy.

Each sestiere has its own house numbering system. Each house has a unique number in the district, from one to several thousand, generally numbered from one corner of the area to another, but not usually in a readily understandable manner.

== Economy ==
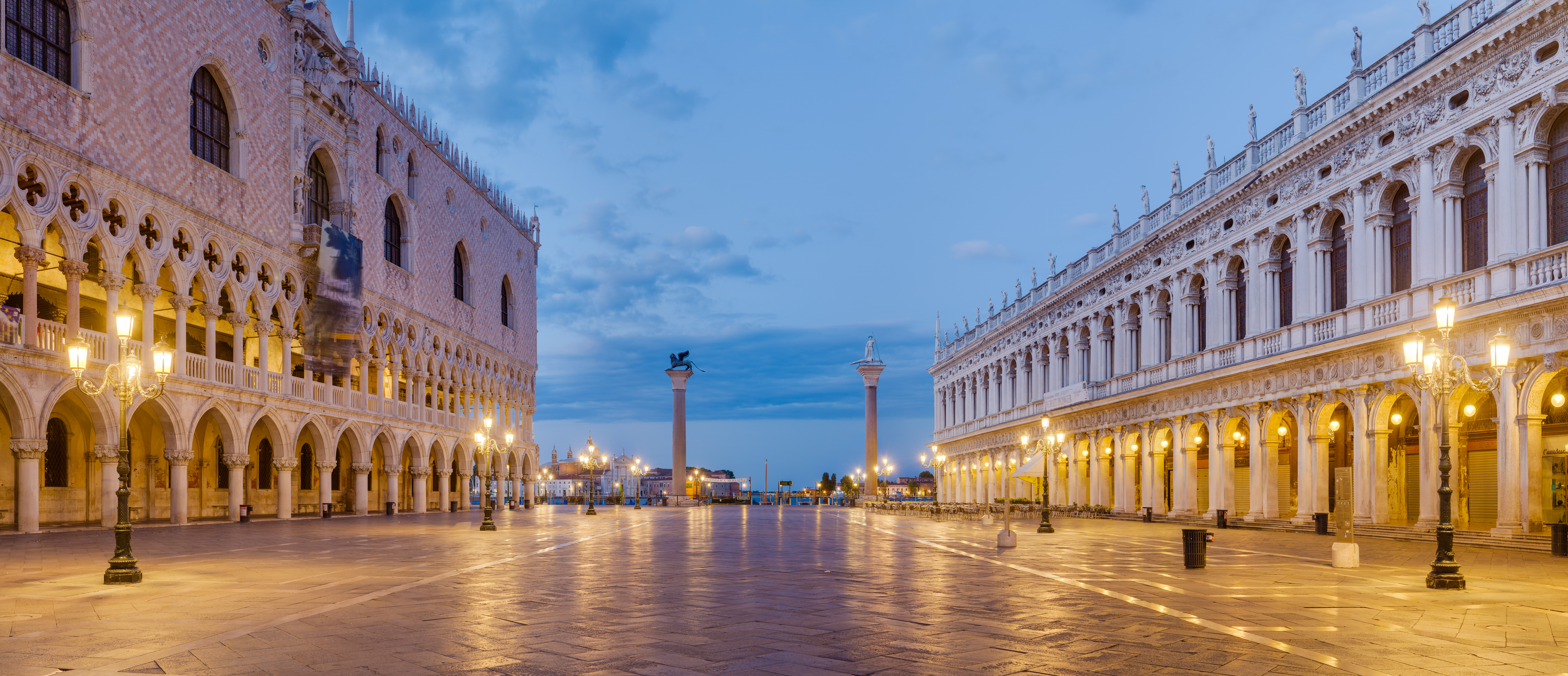
St. Mark Square with Doge's Palace on the left and the columns of the Lion of Venice and St. Theodore in the center

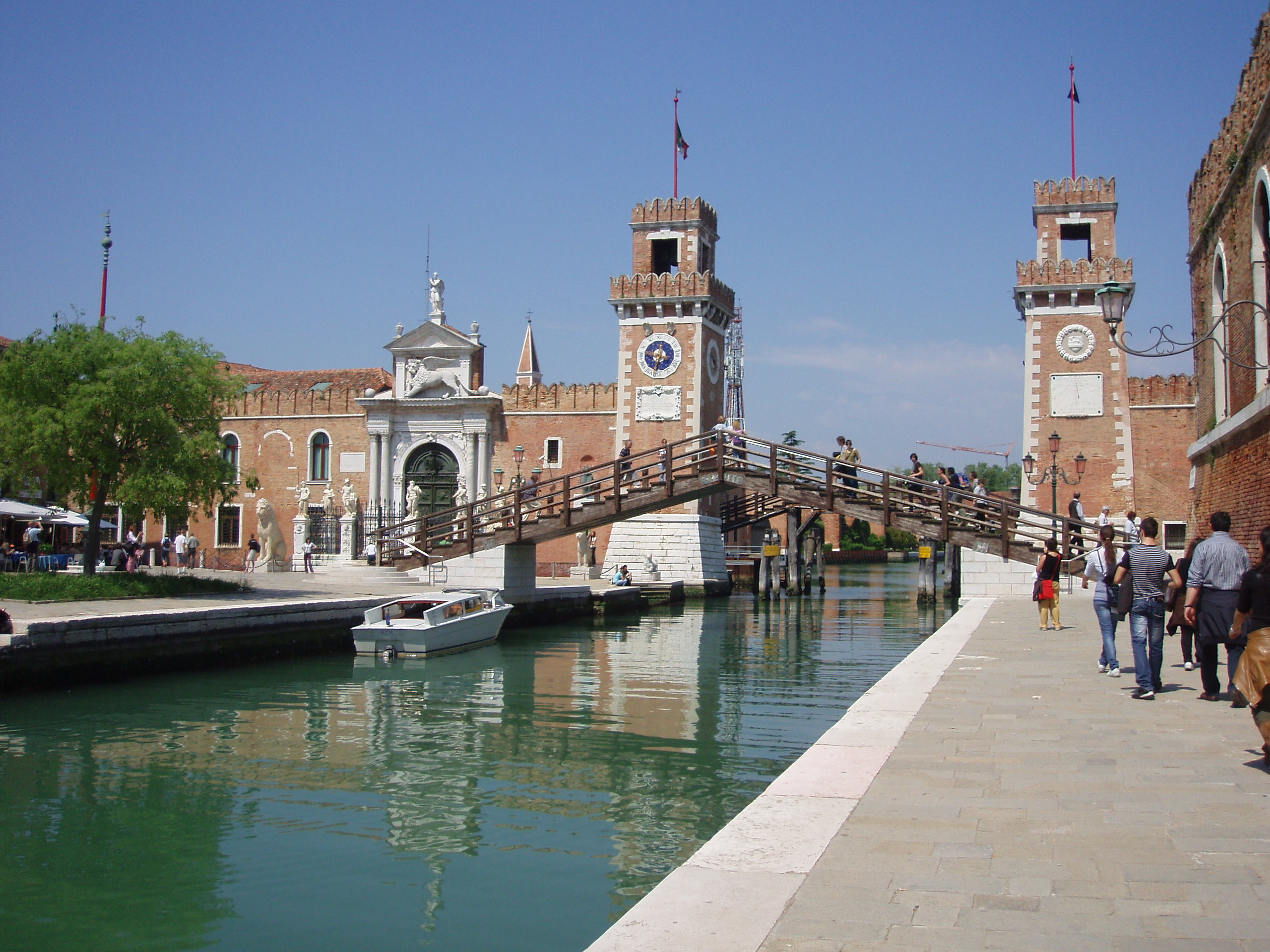
The Venetian Arsenal is a complex of former shipyards, and now houses the Naval Historical Museum.

Venice's economy has changed throughout history. Although there is little specific information about the earliest years, it is likely that an important source of the city's prosperity was the trade in slaves, captured in central Europe and sold to North Africa and the Levant. Venice's location at the head of the Adriatic, and directly south of the terminus of the Brenner Pass over the Alps, would have given it a distinct advantage as a middleman in this important trade. In the Middle Ages and the Renaissance, Venice was a major centre for commerce and trade, as it controlled a vast sea-empire, and became an extremely wealthy European city and a leader in political and economic affairs. From the 11th century until the 15th century, pilgrimages to the Holy Land were offered in Venice. Other ports such as Genoa, Pisa, Marseille, Ancona, and Dubrovnik were hardly able to compete with the well-organized transportation of pilgrims from Venice.

Armenian merchants from Julfa were the leading traders in Venice, especially the Sceriman family in the 17th century, who specialized in gems and diamonds. The trade volume reached millions of tons, which was exceptional for 17th century. This all changed by the 17th century, when Venice's trade empire was taken over by countries such as Portugal, and its importance as a naval power was diminished. In the 18th century, it became a major agricultural and industrial exporter; the century's biggest industrial complex was the Venice Arsenal, which the Italian Army still uses today (though some space has been designated for major theatrical and cultural productions and art). Since World War II, many Venetians have moved to the neighboring cities of Mestre and Porto Marghera, seeking employment as well as affordable housing.

Today, Venice's economy has strengths in tourism, shipbuilding, services, trade, and industrial exports. Murano glass production in Murano and lace production in Burano are also highly important to the economy. Some major companies in Venice include ACTV, Acqua Minerale San Benedetto, Banca IFIS, Barovier & Toso, Gruppo PAM, OVS, SAVE S.p.A, Tessiture Luigi Bevilacqua, and UMANA S.p.A.

=== Tourism ===
The annual trend of tourism sector in Venice from 2013 to 2023 is divided by the number of presences per type of hotel establishments. The total number of presences indicates the number of nights spent by tourists in hotel establishments.

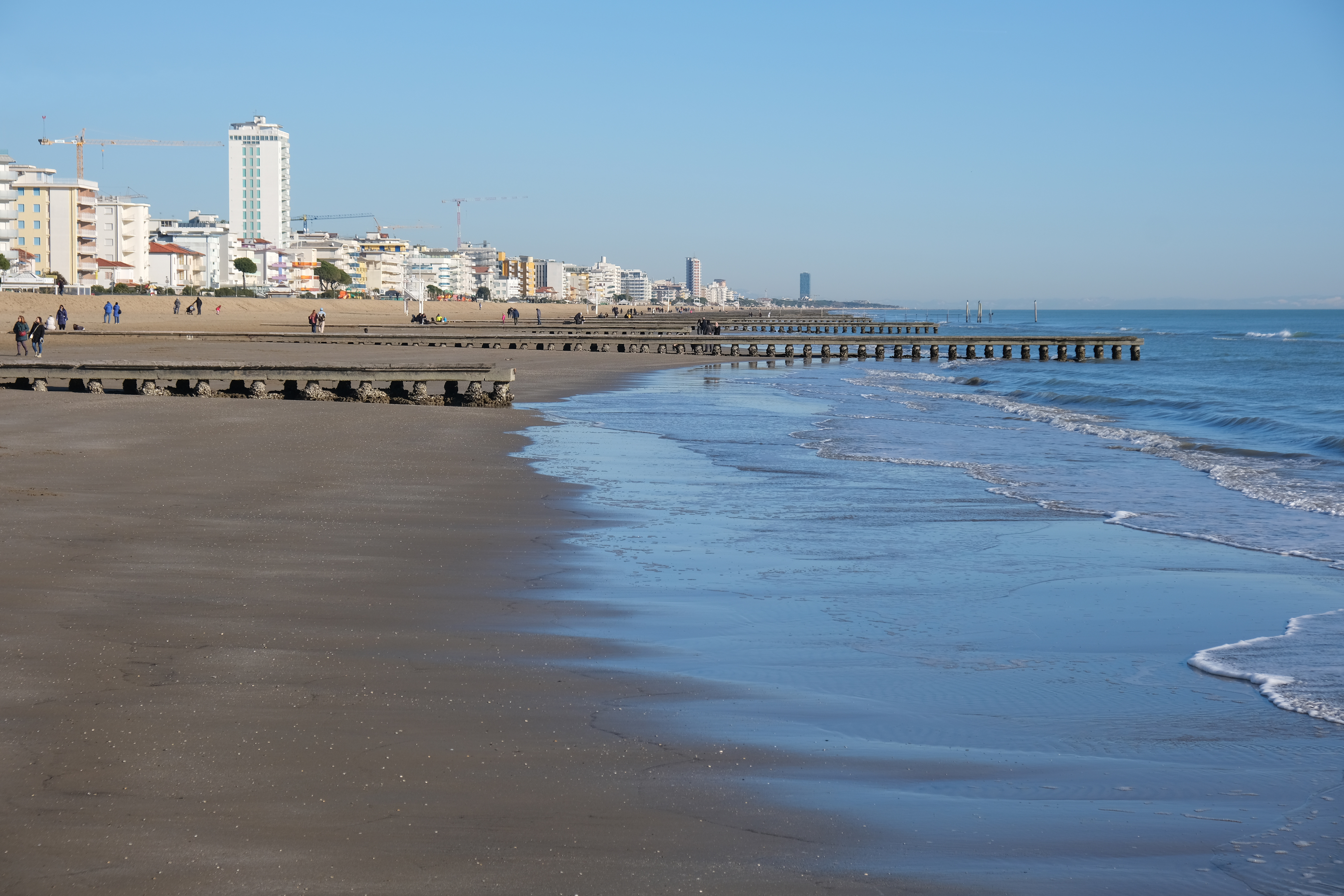
The beach of Lido di Venezia

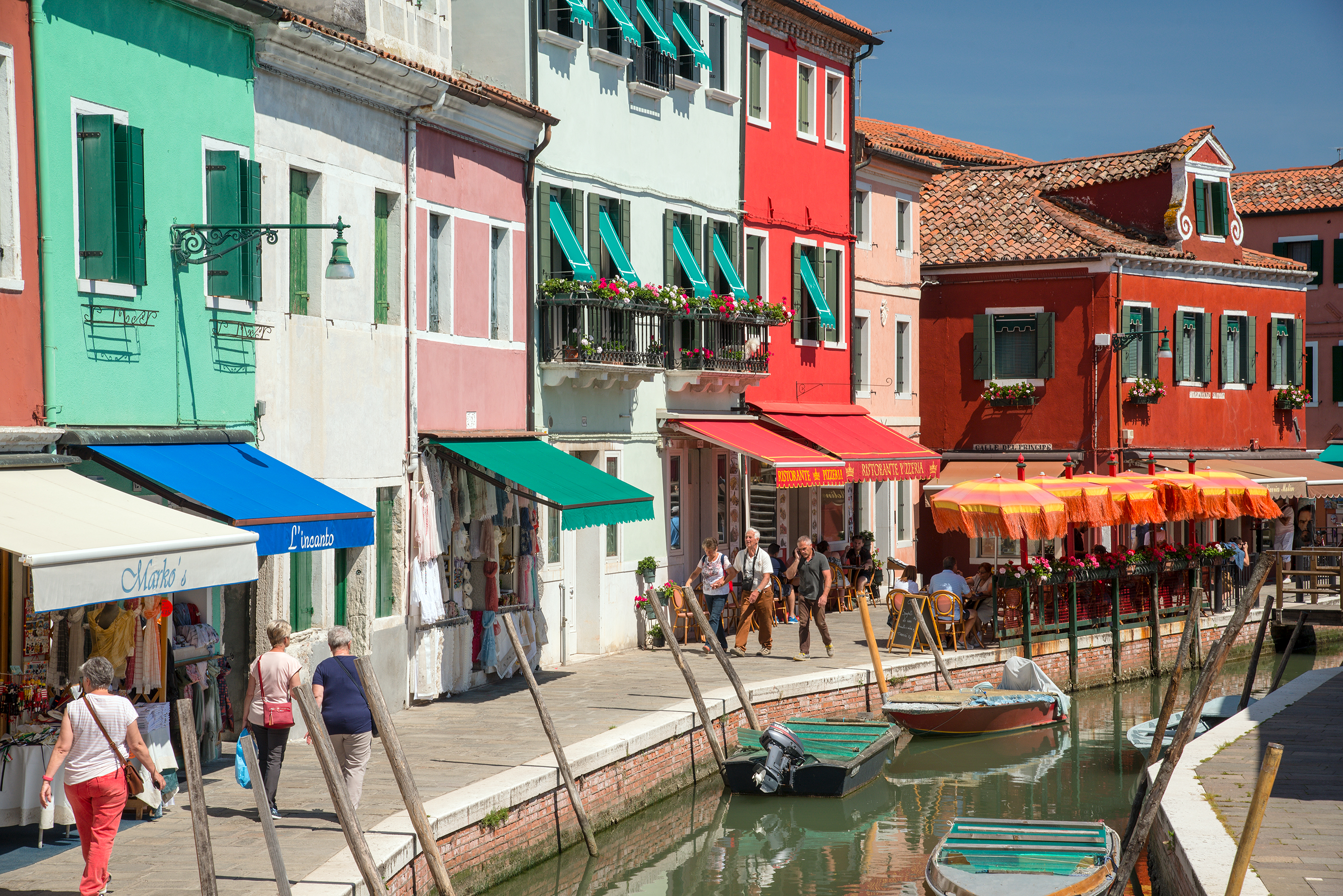
Burano, tourist destination usually reached via vaporetto

Venice is an important destination for tourists who want to experience its celebrated art and architecture, hosting up to 60,000 tourists per day (2017 estimate). Estimates of the annual number of tourists vary from 22 million to 30 million. This "overtourism" creates overcrowding and environmental problems for Venice's ecosystem. By 2017, UNESCO was considering the addition of Venice to its "In-Danger" list, which includes historical ruins in war-torn countries. To reduce the number of visitors, who are causing irreversible changes in Venice, the agency supports limiting the number of cruise ships as well as implementing a strategy for more sustainable tourism.

Tourism has been a major part of the Venetian economy since the 18th century, when Venice – with its beautiful cityscape, uniqueness, and rich musical and artistic cultural heritage – was a stop on the Grand Tour. In the 19th century, Venice became a fashionable centre for the rich and famous, who often stayed and dined at luxury establishments such as the Danieli Hotel and the Caffè Florian, and continued to be a fashionable city into the early 20th century. In the 1980s, the Carnival of Venice was revived, and the city has become a major centre of international conferences and festivals, such as the prestigious Venice Biennale and the Venice Film Festival, which attract visitors from all over the world for their theatrical, cultural, cinematic, artistic, and musical productions.

Today, there are numerous attractions in Venice, such as St. Mark's Basilica, the Doge's Palace, the Grand Canal, and the Piazza San Marco. The Lido di Venezia is also a popular international luxury destination, attracting thousands of actors, critics, celebrities, and others in the cinematic industry. The city also relies heavily on the cruise business. The Cruise Venice Committee has estimated that cruise ship passengers spend more than 150 million euros (US$193 million) annually in the city, according to a 2015 report. Other reports, however, point out that such day-trippers spend relatively little in the few hours of their visits to the city.

Venice is regarded by some as a tourist trap, and by others as a "living museum".

==== Diverting cruise ships ====
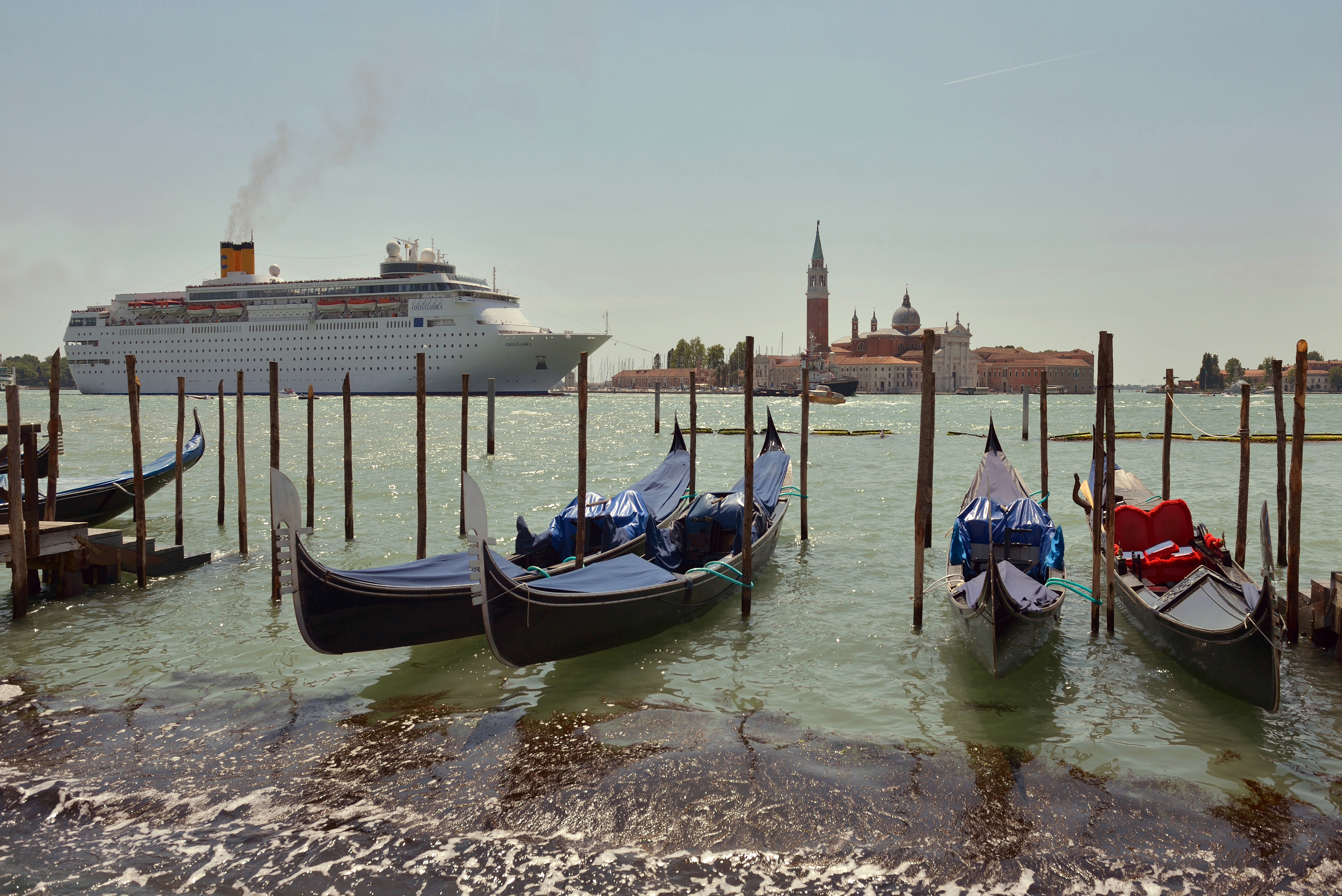
Cruise ship and gondolas in the San Marco basin

The need to protect the city's historic environment and fragile canals, in the face of a possible loss of jobs produced by cruise tourism, has seen the Italian Transport Ministry attempt to introduce a ban on large cruise ships visiting the city. A 2013 ban would have allowed only cruise ships smaller than 40,000-gross tons to enter the Giudecca Canal and St Mark's basin. In January 2015, a regional court scrapped the ban, but some global cruise lines indicated that they would continue to respect it until a long-term solution for the protection of Venice is found.

P&O Cruises removed Venice from its summer schedule; Holland America moved one of its ships from this area to Alaska; and Cunard reduced (in 2017 and further in 2018) the number of visits by its ships. As a result, the Venice Port Authority estimated an 11.4 per cent drop in cruise ships arriving in 2017 versus 2016, leading to a similar reduction in income for Venice.

Having failed in its 2013 bid to ban oversized cruise ships from the Giudecca Canal, the Italian inter-ministerial Comitatone overseeing Venice's lagoon released an official directive in November 2017 to keep the largest cruise ships away from the Piazza San Marco and the entrance to the Grand Canal. Ships over 55,000 tons will be required to follow a specific route through the Vittorio Emmanuele III Canal to reach Marghera, an industrial area of the mainland, where a passenger terminal would be built.

In 2014, the United Nations warned the city that it may be placed on UNESCO's List of World Heritage in Danger sites unless cruise ships are banned from the canals near the historic centre.

According to the officials, the plan to create an alternative route for ships would require extensive dredging of the canal and the building of a new port, which would take four years, in total, to complete. However, the activist group No Grandi Navi (No big Ships), argued that the effects of pollution caused by the ships would not be diminished by the re-routing plan.

Some locals continued to aggressively lobby for new methods that would reduce the number of cruise ship passengers; their estimate indicated that there are up to 30,000 such sightseers per day at peak periods, while others concentrate their effort on promoting a more responsible way of visiting the city. An unofficial referendum to ban large cruise ships was held in June 2017. More than 18,000 people voted at 60 polling booths set up by activists, and 17,874 favored banning large ships from the lagoon. The population of Venice at the time was about 50,000. The organizers of the referendum backed a plan to build a new cruise ship terminal at one of the three entrances to the Venetian Lagoon. Passengers would be transferred to the historic area in smaller boats.

On 2 June 2019, the cruise ship MSC Opera rammed a tourist riverboat, the River Countess, which was docked on the Giudecca Canal, injuring five people, in addition to causing property damage. The incident immediately led to renewed demands to ban large cruise ships from the Giudecca Canal, including a Twitter message to that effect posted by the environment minister. The city's mayor urged authorities to accelerate the steps required for cruise ships to begin using the alternate Vittorio Emanuele canal. Italy's transport minister spoke of a "solution to protect both the lagoon and tourism ... after many years of inertia" but specifics were not reported. As of June 2019, the 2017 plan to establish an alternative route for large ships, preventing them from coming near the historic area of the city, has not yet been approved.

Nonetheless, the Italian government released an announcement on 7 August 2019 that it would begin rerouting cruise ships larger than 1000 tonnes away from the historic city's Giudecca Canal. For the last four months of 2019, all heavy vessels would dock at the Fusina and Lombardia terminals which are still on the lagoon but away from the central islands. By 2020, one-third of all cruise ships would be rerouted, according to Danilo Toninelli, the minister for Venice. Preparation work for the Vittorio Emanuele Canal needed to begin soon for a long-term solution, according to the Cruise Lines International Association. In the long-term, space for ships would be provided at new terminals, perhaps at Chioggia or Lido San Nicolo. That plan was not imminent however, since public consultations had not yet begun. Over 1.5 million people per year arrive in Venice on cruise ships. The Italian government decided to divert large cruise ships beginning August 2021.

==== Other tourism mitigation efforts ====
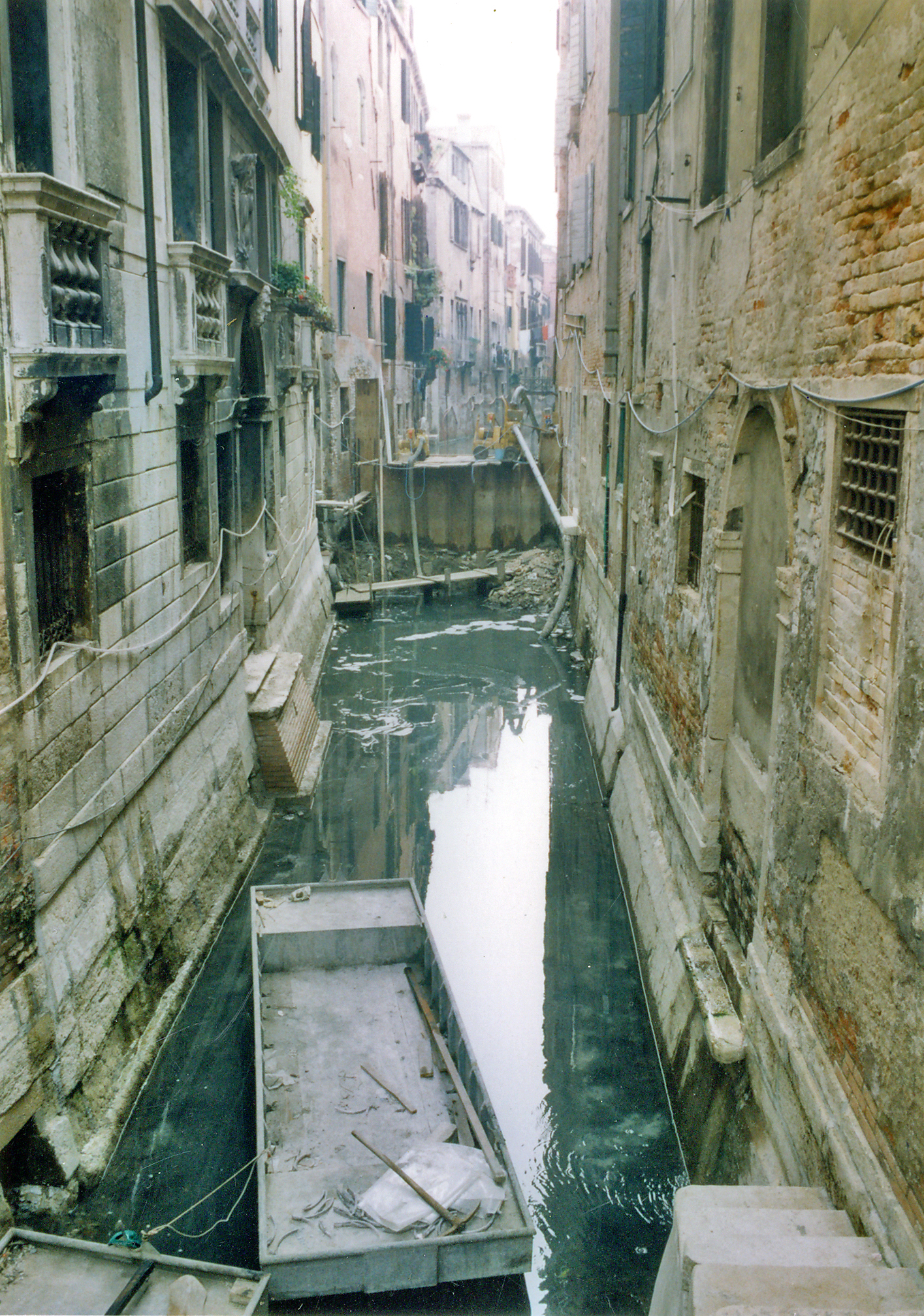
Cleaning of canals in the late 1990s

Having failed in its 2013 bid to ban oversized cruise ships from the Giudecca Canal, the city switched to a new strategy in mid-2017, banning the creation of any additional hotels. Currently, there are over 24,000 hotel rooms. The ban does not affect short-term rentals in the historic centre which are causing an increase in the cost of living for the native residents of Venice. The city had already banned any additional fast food "take-away" outlets, to retain the historic character of the city, which was another reason for freezing the number of hotel rooms. Fewer than half of the millions of annual visitors stay overnight, however.

The city also considered a ban on wheeled suitcases, but settled for banning hard plastic wheels for transporting cargo from May 2015.

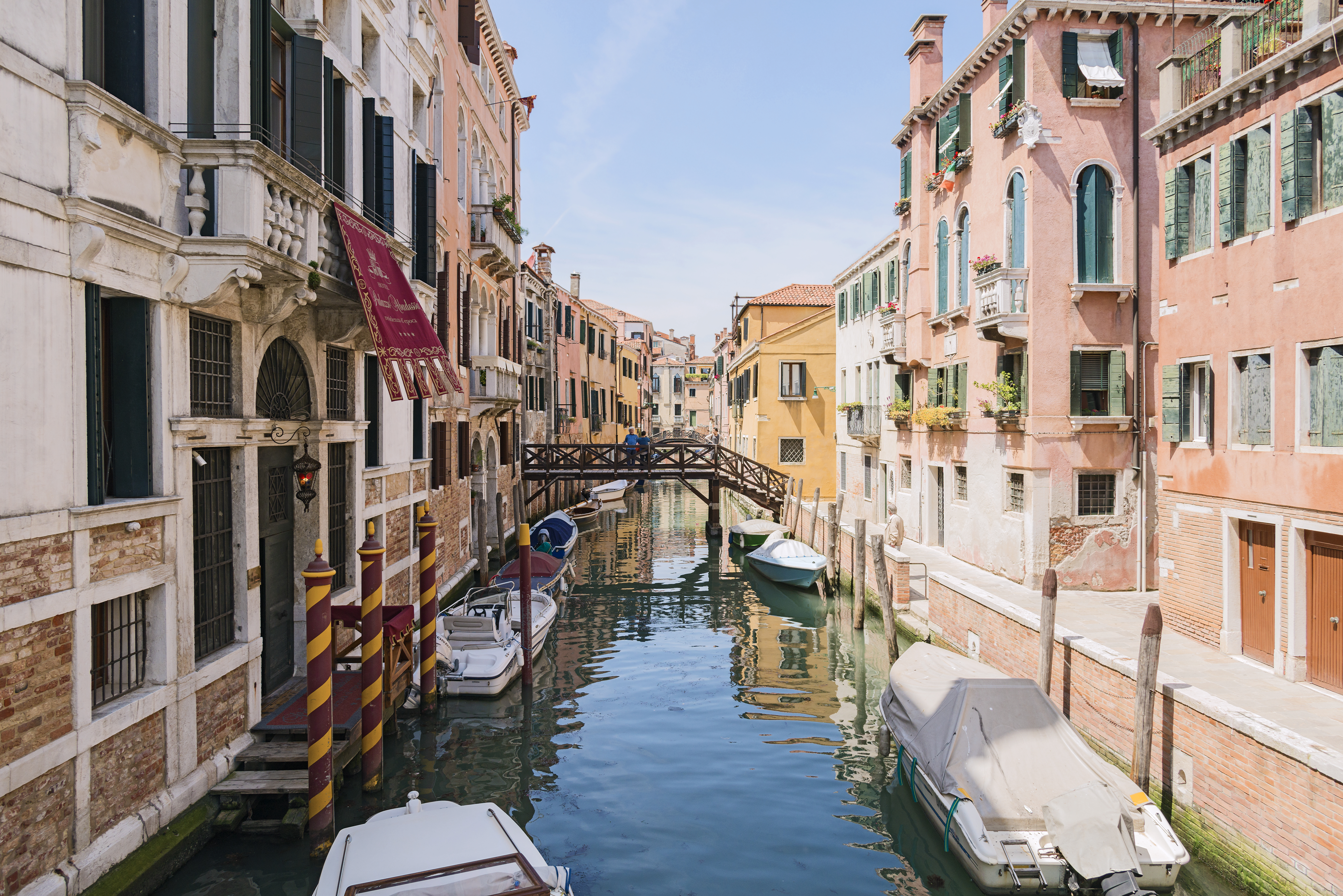
View from the Bridge Priuli a Santa Sofia, to the Bridge de le Vele

In addition to accelerating erosion of the ancient city's foundations and creating some pollution in the lagoon, cruise ships dropping an excessive number of day trippers can make St. Marks Square and other popular attractions too crowded to walk through during the peak season. Government officials see little value to the economy from the "eat and flee" tourists who stay for less than a day, which is typical of those from cruise ships.

On 28 February 2019, the Venice City Council voted in favour of a new municipal regulation requiring day-trippers visiting the historic centre, and the islands in the lagoon, to pay a new access fee. The extra revenue from the fee would be used for cleaning, maintaining security, reducing the financial burden on residents of Venice, and to "allow Venetians to live with more decorum". The new tax would be between €3 and €10 per person, depending on the expected tourist flow into the old city. The fee could be waived for certain types of travelers: including students, children under the age of 6, voluntary workers, residents of the Veneto region, and participants in sporting events. Overnight visitors, who already pay a "stay" tax and account for around 40% of Venice's yearly total of 28 million visitors, would also be exempted. The access fee was expected to come into effect in September 2019; but it was postponed, firstly, until 1 January 2020, and then, again, due to the coronavirus pandemic. The new charge of €5 started to be imposed on those tourists who are not staying overnight and came into force on 25 April 2024. It is only charged on peak visitor days, and several classes of people are exempt, including Veneto residents, hotel guests (including mainland boroughs of Venice), local workers, and students. Cell phone data showed more tourists came on fee-charged days in 2024, generating more money than expected, and leaving the city to decide whether to raise the fee for the next tourist season or try other approaches. Building on the 2024 pilot, the 2025 season saw the access fee extended to cover 54 days, primarily during weekends and holidays between April and July. While the base price remained €5, the city introduced a tiered surcharge for 2025, increasing the fee to €10 for visitors who failed to register at least four days in advance. For the 2026 season, the system was further expanded to 60 days. The 2026 regulations solidified the mandatory digital reservation system for all non-resident day-trippers, intended to facilitate real-time management of arrival caps and provide the city with granular data to adjust the deterrent fees for subsequent tourist cycles.

One heavily criticized aspect of the access fee is that it "reinforces the perception that Venice is a theme park". After the access fee went into effect, "astonished locals" have reported that bewildered tourists have asked them questions like "Where is the exit?" and, "What time does it close?"

A regulation taking effect on 1 June 2024 limits tour groups to 25 people and bans loudspeakers.

== Transport ==
=== In the historic centre ===
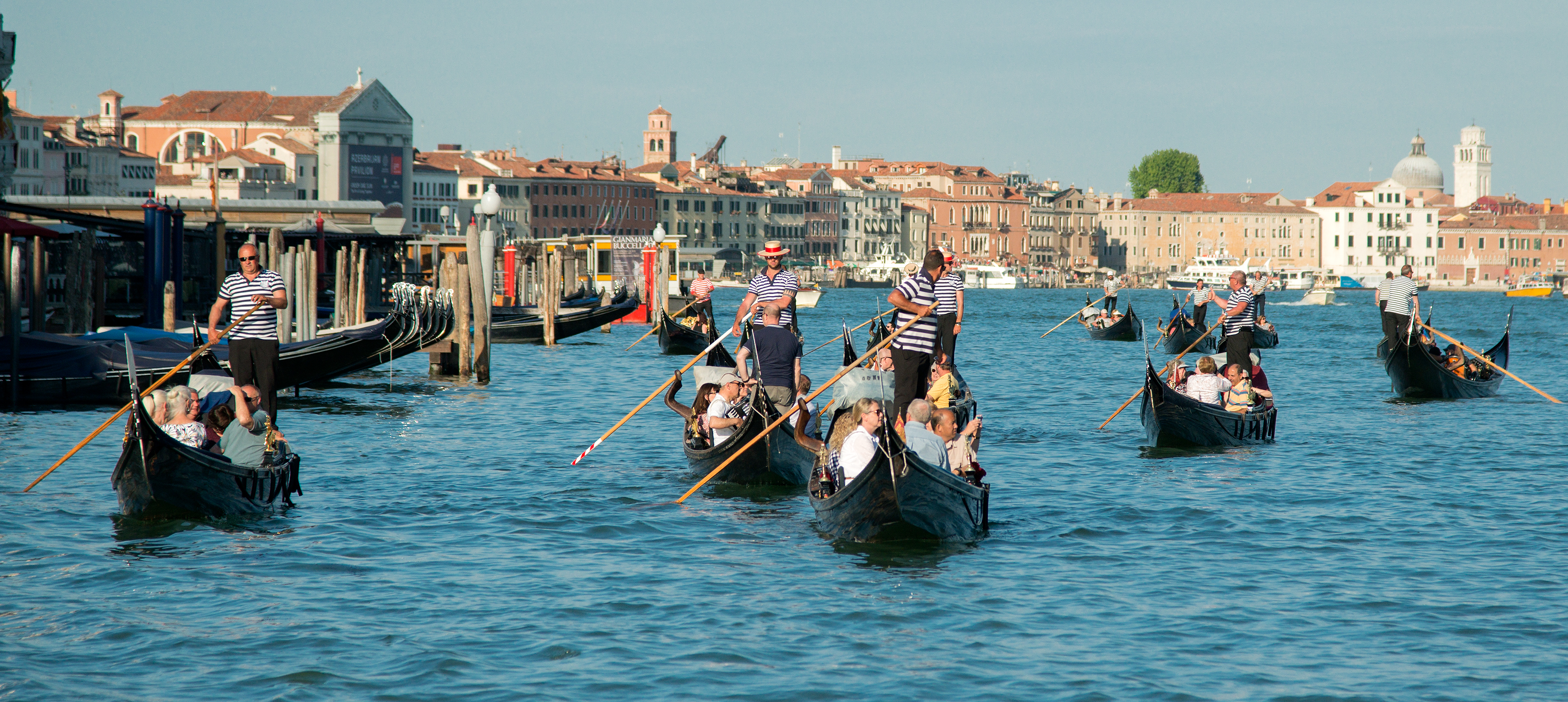
Gondoliers on the Grand Canal

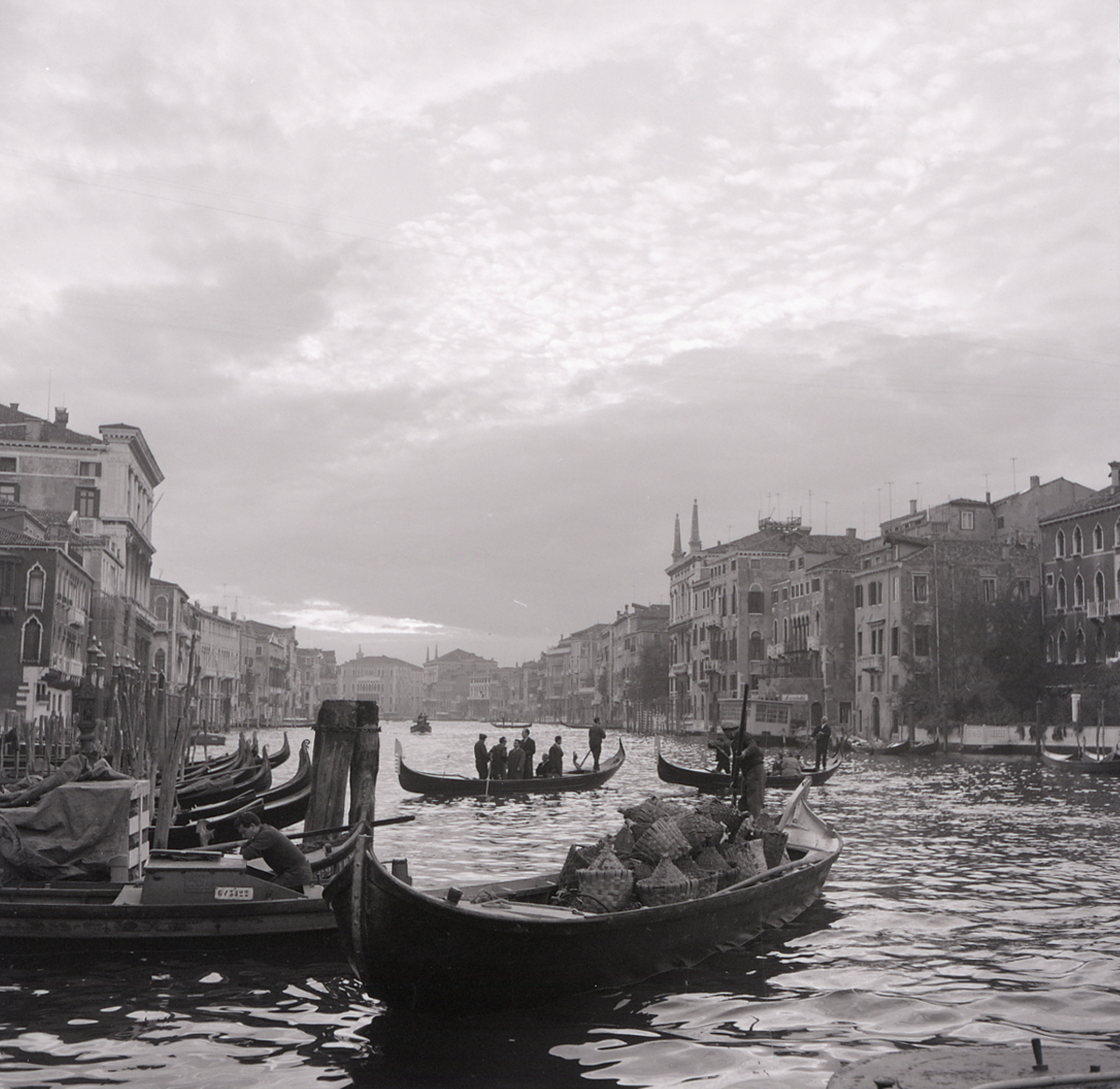
Sandolo in a picture of Paolo Monti of 1965. Fondo Paolo Monti, BEIC.

Venice is built on an archipelago of 118 islands in a shallow, 550 km^{2} (212 sq mi) lagoon, connected by 400 bridges over 177 canals. In the 19th century, a causeway to the mainland brought the railroad to Venice. The adjoining Ponte della Libertà road causeway and terminal parking facilities in Tronchetto island and Piazzale Roma were built during the 20th century. Beyond these rail and road terminals on the northern edge of the city, transportation within the city's historic centre remains, as it was in centuries past, entirely on water or on foot. Venice is Europe's largest urban car-free area and is unique in Europe in having remained a sizable functioning city in the 21st century entirely without motorcars or trucks.

The classic Venetian boat is the gondola, (plural: gondole) although it is now mostly used for tourists, or for weddings, funerals, or other ceremonies, or as traghetti (sing.: traghetto) to cross the Grand Canal in lieu of a nearby bridge. The traghetti are operated by two oarsmen.

There are approximately 400 licensed gondoliers in Venice, in their distinctive livery, and a similar number of boats, down from 10,000 two centuries ago. Many gondolas are lushly appointed with crushed velvet seats and Persian rugs. At the front of each gondola that works in the city, there is a large piece of metal called the fèro (iron). Its shape has evolved through the centuries, as documented in many well-known paintings. Its form, topped by a likeness of the Doge's hat, became gradually standardized, and was then fixed by local law. It consists of five bars pointing forward and one pointing backward, representing the sestieri of the city; the one that points backwards represents the Giudecca. A lesser-known boat is the smaller, simpler, but similar, sandolo.

==== Waterways ====
Venice's small islands were enhanced during the Middle Ages by the dredging of soil to raise the marshy ground above the tides. The resulting canals encouraged the flourishing of a nautical culture which proved central to the economy of the city. Today those canals still provide the means for transport of goods and people within the city.

The maze of canals threading through the city requires more than 400 bridges to permit the flow of foot traffic. In 2011, the city opened the Ponte della Costituzione, the fourth bridge across the Grand Canal, which connects the Piazzale Roma bus-terminal area with the Venezia Santa Lucia railway station. The other bridges are the original Ponte di Rialto, the Ponte dell'Accademia, and the Ponte degli Scalzi.

=== Public transport ===
Azienda del Consorzio Trasporti Veneziano (ACTV) is a public company responsible for public transportation in Venice.

==== Lagoon area ====
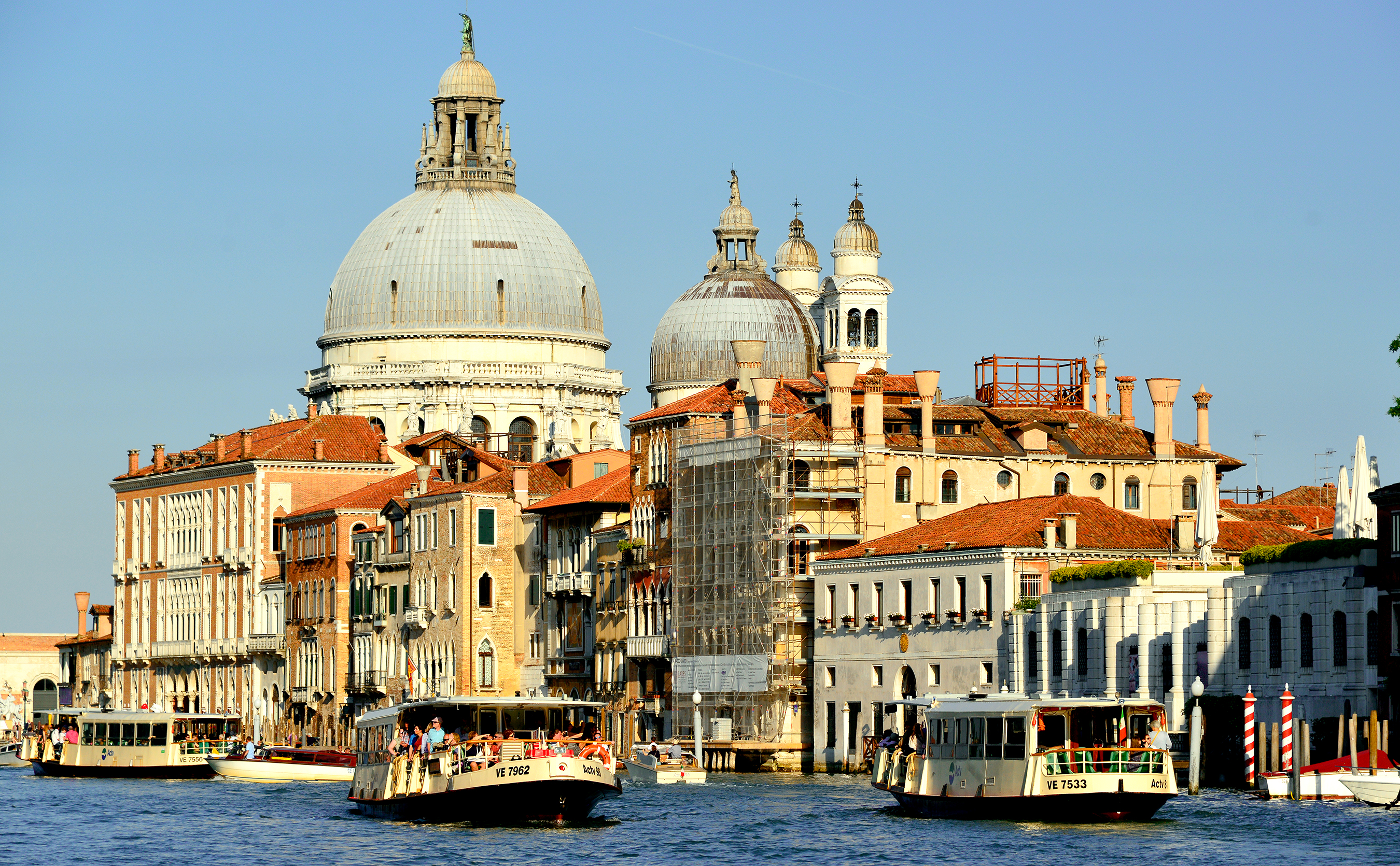
Vaporetti on the Grand Canal

The main means of public transportation consists of motorised waterbuses (vaporetti) which ply regular routes along the Grand Canal and between the city's islands. Private motorised water taxis are also active. The only gondole still in common use by Venetians are the traghetti, foot passenger ferries crossing the Grand Canal at certain points where there are no convenient bridges. Other gondole are rented by tourists on an hourly basis.

The Venice People Mover is an elevated shuttle train public transit system connecting Tronchetto island with its car parking facility with Piazzale Roma where visitors arrive in the city by bus, taxi, or automobile. The train makes a stop at the Marittima cruise terminal at the Port of Venice.

==== Lido and Pellestrina islands ====
Lido and Pellestrina are two islands forming a barrier between the southern Venetian Lagoon and the Adriatic Sea. On those islands, road traffic, including bus service, is allowed. Vaporetti link them with other islands (Venice, Murano, Burano) and with the peninsula of Cavallino-Treporti.

==== Mainland ====
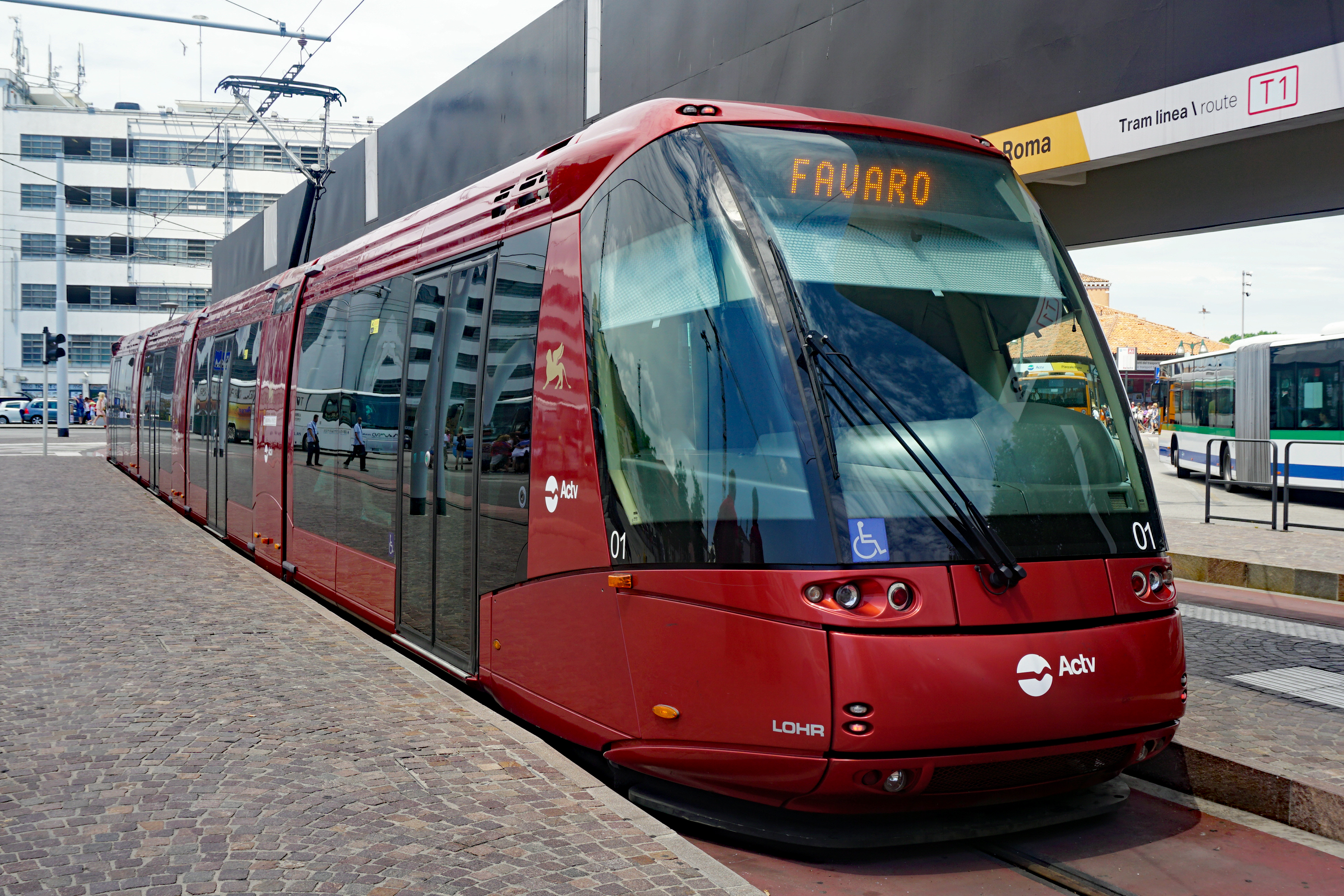
Tram in Venice leaving Piazzale Roma

The mainland of Venice is composed of 4 boroughs: Mestre-Carpenedo, Marghera, Chirignago-Zelarino, and Favaro Veneto. Mestre is the centre and the most populous urban area of the mainland. There are several bus routes and two Translohr tramway lines. Several bus routes and one of the tramway lines link the mainland with Piazzale Roma, the main bus station in Venice, via Ponte della Libertà, the road bridge connecting the mainland with the group of islands that comprise the historic centre of Venice.

The average amount of time people spend commuting with public transit in Venice, for example to and from work, on a weekday is 52 min. Only 12.2% of public transit riders ride for more than 2 hours every day. The average amount of time people wait at a stop or station for public transit is 10 min, while 17.6% of riders wait for over 20 minutes on average every day. The average distance people usually ride in a single trip with public transit is 7 kilometres (4.3 mi), while 12% travel for over 12 kilometres (7.5 mi) in a single direction.

=== Rail ===
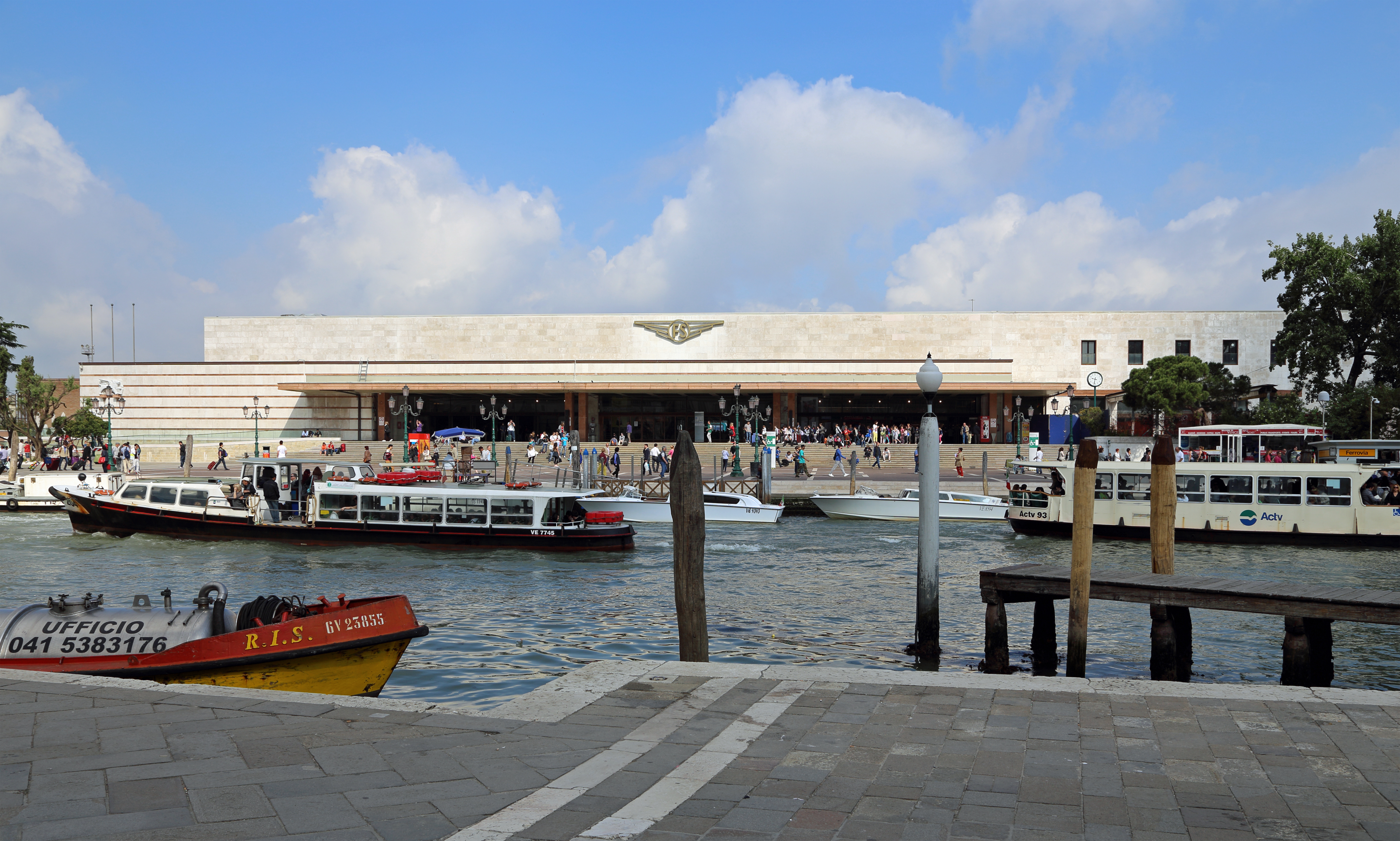
The Venice Santa Lucia station

Venice is served by regional and national trains, including trains to Florence (1h53), Milan (2h13), Turin (3h10), Rome (3h33), and Naples (4h50).

There are international day trains to Zurich, Innsbruck, Munich, and Vienna, plus overnight sleeper services, to Paris and Dijon on Thello trains, and to Munich and Vienna via Austrian Federal Railways.

European Sleeper operates a sleeper train between Brussels and Venice, stopping in Utrecht.

- The Venezia Santa Lucia railway station is a few steps away from a vaporetti stop, Ferovia, in the historic city next to the Piazzale Roma. This station is the terminus of local trains and of the luxury Venice Simplon Orient Express from London via Paris and other cities.
- The Venezia Mestre railway station is on the mainland, on the border between the boroughs of Mestre and Marghera.

Both stations are managed by Grandi Stazioni; they are linked by the Ponte della Libertà (Liberty Bridge) between the mainland and the city centre.

Other stations in the municipality are Venezia Porto Marghera, Venezia Carpenedo, Venezia Mestre Ospedale, and Venezia Mestre Porta Ovest.

=== Ports ===
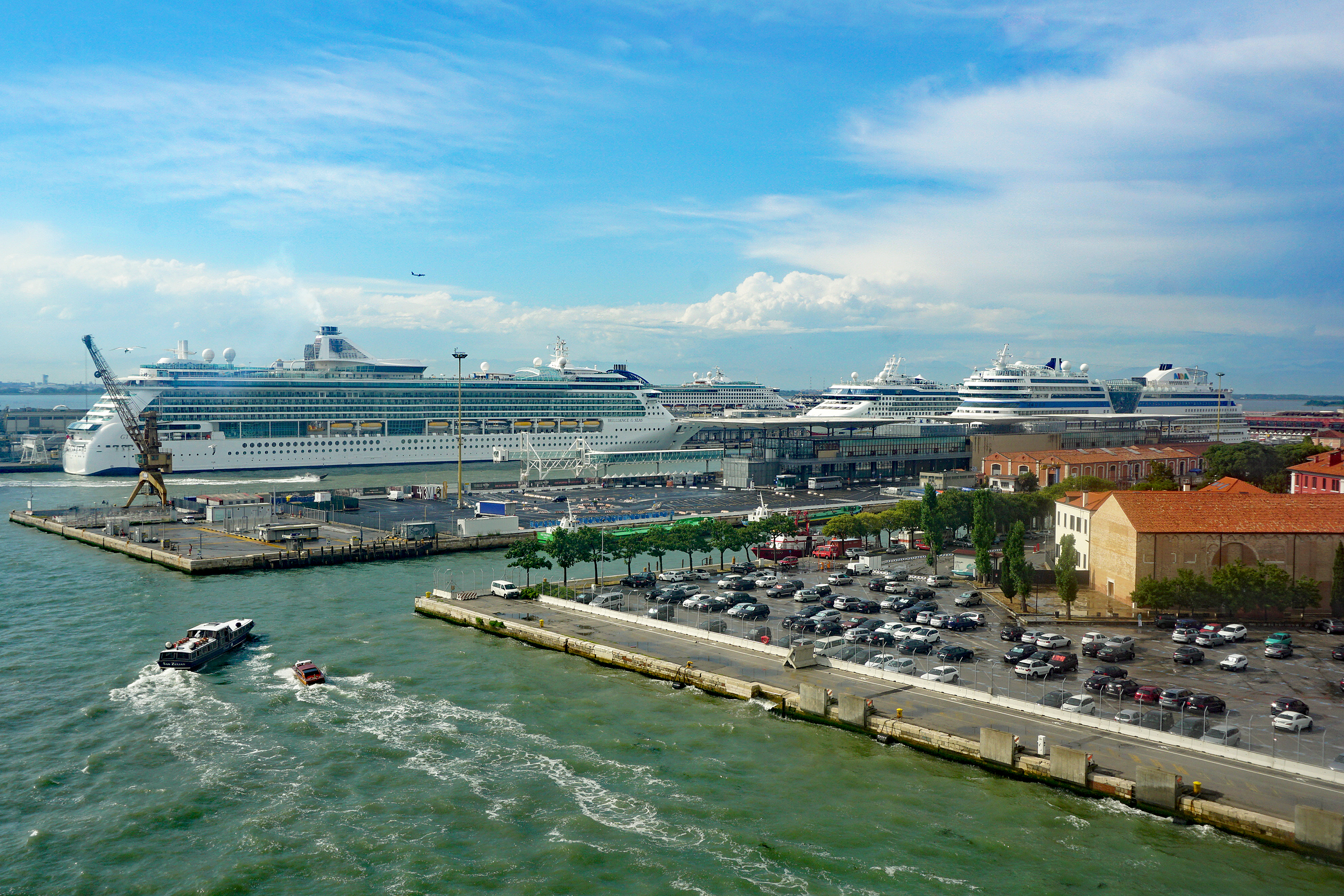
Cruise ships at the passenger terminal in the Port of Venice (Venezia Terminal Passeggeri)

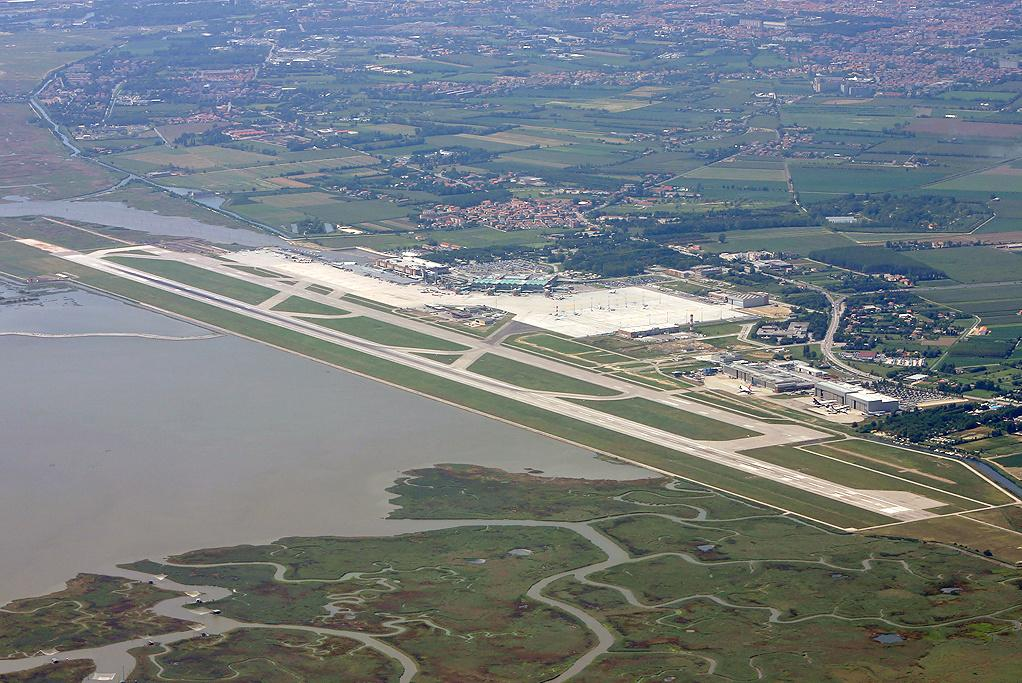
Marco Polo International Airport (Aeroporto di Venezia Marco Polo)

The Port of Venice (Italian: Porto di Venezia) is the eighth-busiest commercial port in Italy and was a major hub for the cruise sector in the Mediterranean, as since August 2021 ships of more 25,000 tons are forbidden to pass the Giudecca Canal. It is one of the major Italian ports and is included in the list of the leading European ports which are located on the strategic nodes of trans-European networks. In 2002, the port handled 262,337 containers. In 2006, 30,936,931 tonnes passed through the port, of which 14,541,961 was commercial traffic, and saw 1,453,513 passengers.

=== Aviation ===
Marco Polo International Airport (Aeroporto di Venezia Marco Polo) is named in honor of Marco Polo. The airport is on the mainland and was rebuilt away from the coast. Public transport from the airport takes one to:

- Venice Piazzale Roma by ATVO (provincial company) buses and by ACTV (city company) buses (route 5 aerobus);
- Venice, Lido, and Murano by Allilaguna (private company) motor boats;
- Mestre, the mainland, where Venice Mestre railway station is convenient for connections to Milan, Padua, Trieste, Verona and the rest of Italy, and for ACTV (routes 15 and 45) and ATVO buses and other transport;
- Regional destinations, such as Treviso and Padua, by ATVO and Busitalia Sita Nord buses.

Venice-Treviso Airport, about 30 kilometres (19 mi) from Venice, is used mainly by low-cost airlines. There are public buses from this airport to Venice. Venezia-Lido "Giovanni Nicelli", a public airport suitable for smaller aircraft, is at the northeast end of Lido di Venezia. It has a 994-metre (3,261 ft) grass runway.

== Education ==
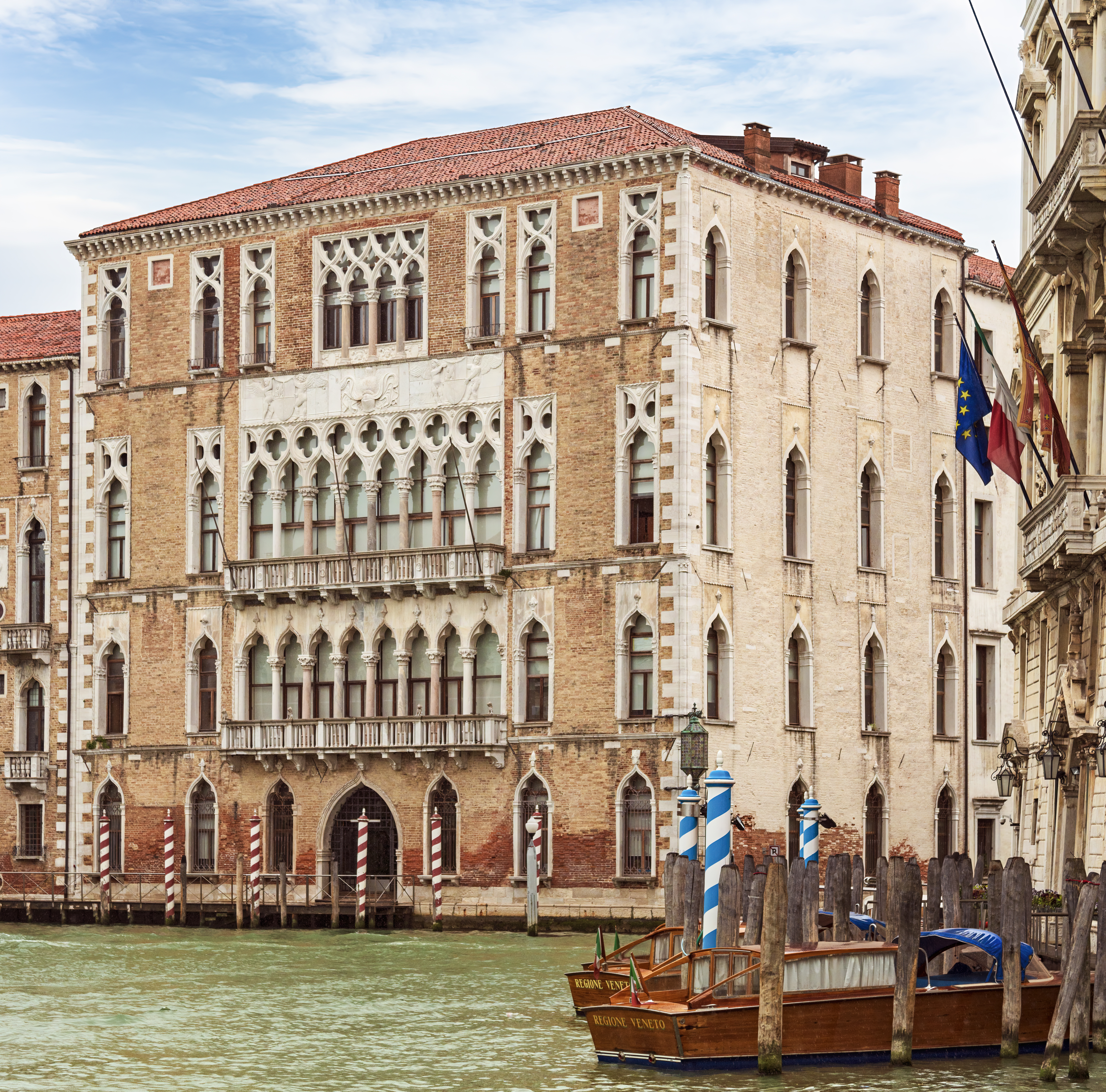
Ca' Foscari University of Venice

Venice is a major international centre for higher education. The city hosts the Ca' Foscari University of Venice, founded in 1868; the Università Iuav di Venezia, founded in 1926; the Venice International University, founded in 1995 and located on the island of San Servolo and the EIUC-European Inter-University Centre for Human Rights and Democratisation, located on the island of Lido di Venezia.

Other Venetian institutions of higher education include the Accademia di Belle Arti (Academy of Fine Arts), established in 1750, whose first chairman was Giovanni Battista Piazzetta, and the Benedetto Marcello Conservatory of Music, which was first established in 1876 as a high school and musical society, later (1915) became Liceo Musicale, and then, when its director was Gian Francesco Malipiero, the State Conservatory of Music (1940).

== Culture ==
=== Literature ===
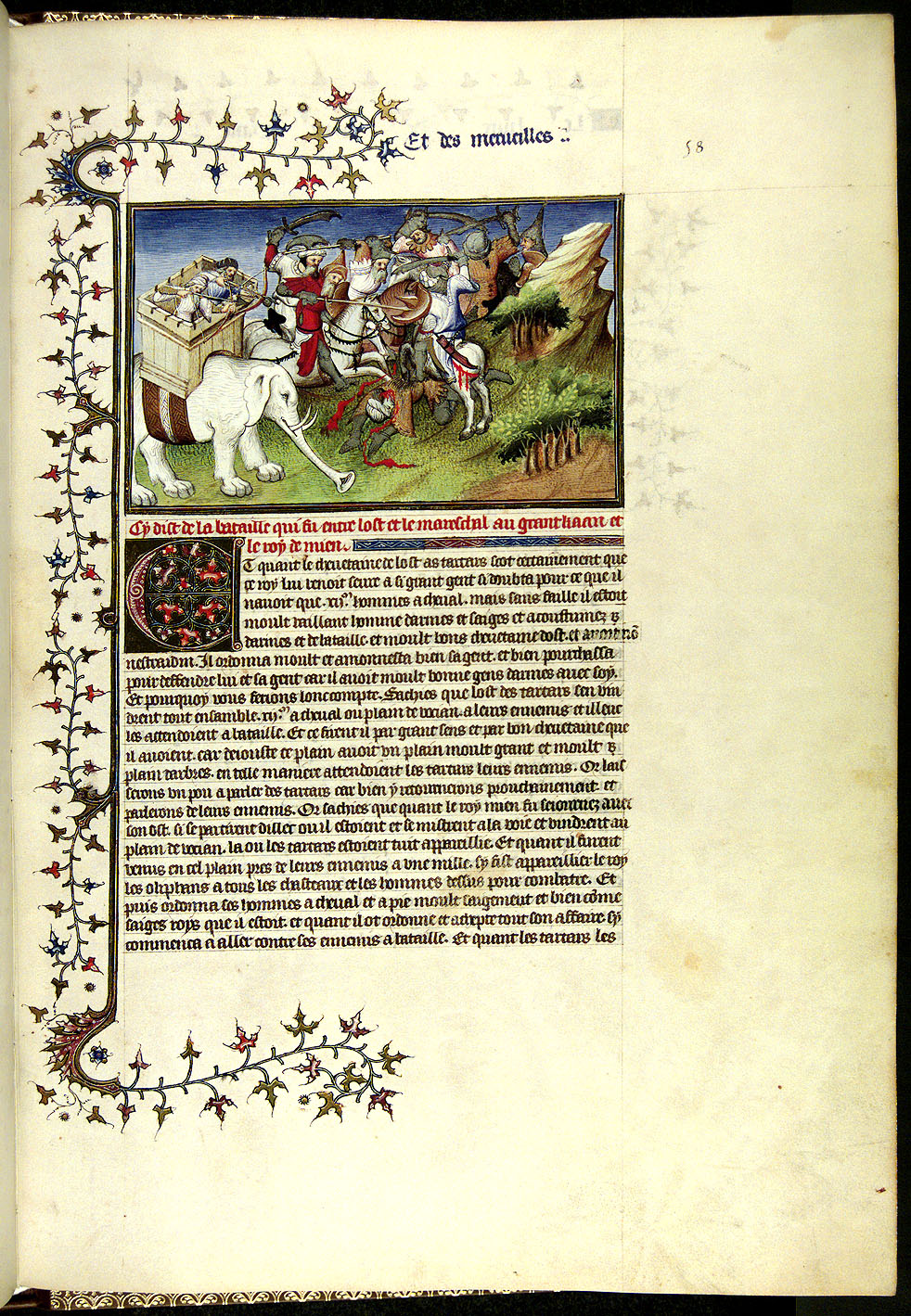
The Travels of Marco Polo

Venice has long been a source of inspiration for authors, playwrights, and poets, and at the forefront of the technological development of printing and publishing.

Two of the most noted Venetian writers were Marco Polo in the Middle Ages and, later, Giacomo Casanova. Polo (1254–1324) was a merchant who voyaged to the Orient. His series of books, co-written with Rustichello da Pisa and titled Il Milione provided important knowledge of the lands east of Europe, from the Middle East to China, Japan, and Russia. Giacomo Casanova (1725–1798) was a prolific writer and adventurer best remembered for his autobiography, Histoire De Ma Vie (Story of My Life), which links his colourful lifestyle to the city of Venice.

Venetian playwrights followed the old Italian theatre tradition of commedia dell'arte. Ruzante (1502–1542), Carlo Goldoni (1707–1793), and Carlo Gozzi (1720–1806) used the Venetian dialect extensively in their comedies.

Venice has also inspired writers from abroad. Shakespeare set Othello and The Merchant of Venice in the city, as did Thomas Mann his novel, Death in Venice (1912). The French writer Philippe Sollers spent most of his life in Venice and published A Dictionary For Lovers of Venice in 2004.

The city features prominently in Henry James's The Aspern Papers and The Wings of the Dove. It is also visited in Evelyn Waugh's Brideshead Revisited and Marcel Proust's In Search of Lost Time. Perhaps the best-known children's book set in Venice is The Thief Lord, written by the German author Cornelia Funke.

Venice is described in Goethe's Italian Journey, 1786–1788. He describes the architecture, including a church by Palladio and also attends the opera. He visits the shipbuilding yards at the Arsenal. He is fascinated by the street life of Venice, which he describes as a kind of performance.

The poet Ugo Foscolo (1778–1827), born in Zante, an island that at the time belonged to the Republic of Venice, was also a revolutionary who wanted to see a free republic established in Venice following its fall to Napoleon.

Venice also inspired the poetry of Ezra Pound, who wrote his first literary work in the city. Pound died in 1972, and his remains are buried in Venice's cemetery island of San Michele.

Venice is also linked to the technological aspects of writing. The city was the location of one of Italy's earliest printing presses called Aldine Press, established by Aldus Manutius in 1494. From this beginning Venice developed as an important typographic centre. Around fifteen percent of all printing of the fifteenth century came from Venice, and even as late as the 18th century was responsible for printing half of Italy's published books.

==== In literature and adapted works ====
The city is a particularly popular setting for essays, novels, and other works of fictional or non-fictional literature. Examples of these include:

- Aretino's works (1492–1556)
- Shakespeare's Merchant of Venice (c. 1596–1598) and Othello (1603).
- Ben Jonson's Volpone (1605–6).
- Casanova's autobiographical History of My Life c. 1789–1797.
- Voltaire's Candide (1759).
- Letitia Elizabeth Landon wrote poetry for two pictures of Venice; one for The Embarkation, drawn by Clarkson Stanfield for The Amulet, 1833, the other for Santa Salute, drawn by Charles Bentley for the Literary Souvenir, 1835.
- Ernest Hemingway's Across the River and into the Trees (1950).
- Italo Calvino's Invisible Cities (1972).
- Anne Rice's Cry to Heaven (1982).
- Donna Leon's Commissario Guido Brunetti crime fiction series and cookbook, and the German television series based on the novels (1992–2019).
- Philippe Sollers' Watteau in Venice (1994).
- Michael Dibdin's Dead Lagoon (1994), one in a series of novels featuring Venice-born policeman Aurelio Zen.
- Jacqueline Carey's Kushiel's Chosen (2002), an historical fantasy or alternate history of Venice – complete with masquerades, canals, and a doge – taking place in a city known as La Serenissima.
- John Berendt's The City of Falling Angels (2005)
- Gilbert and Sullivan's comic opera The Gondoliers (1889)
- Thomas Mann's novella, Death in Venice (1912), was the basis for Benjamin Britten's opera Death in Venice (1973) and the movie Death in Venice (1971), directed by Luchino Visconti.

==== Foreign words of Venetian origin ====
Some English words with a Venetian etymology include arsenal, ciao, ghetto, gondola, imbroglio, lagoon, lazaret, lido, Montenegro, and regatta.

=== Printing ===
By the end of the 15th century, Venice had become the European capital of printing, having 417 printers by 1500, and being one of the first cities in Italy (after Subiaco and Rome) to have a printing press, after those established in Germany. The most important printing office was the Aldine Press of Aldus Manutius; which in 1497 issued the first printed work of Aristotle; in 1499 printed the Hypnerotomachia Poliphili, considered the most beautiful book of the Renaissance; and established modern punctuation, page format, and italic type.

=== Painting ===
An 18th-century view of Venice by Venetian artist Canaletto

Venice, especially during the Renaissance, and Baroque periods, was a major centre of art and developed a unique style known as the Venetian painting. In the Middle Ages and the Renaissance, Venice, along with Florence and Rome, became one of the most important centres of art in Europe, and numerous wealthy Venetians became patrons of the arts. Venice at the time was a rich and prosperous Maritime Republic, which controlled a vast sea and trade empire.

In the 16th century, Venetian painting was developed through influences from the Paduan School and Antonello da Messina, who introduced the oil painting technique of the Van Eyck brothers. It is signified by a warm colour scale and a picturesque use of colour. Early masters were the Bellini and Vivarini families, followed by Giorgione and Titian, then Tintoretto and Veronese. In the early 16th century, there was rivalry in Venetian painting between the disegno and colorito techniques.

Canvases (the common painting surface) originated in Venice during the early Renaissance. In the 18th century, Venetian painting had a revival with Tiepolo's decorative painting and Canaletto's and Guardi's panoramic views.

=== Venetian architecture ===
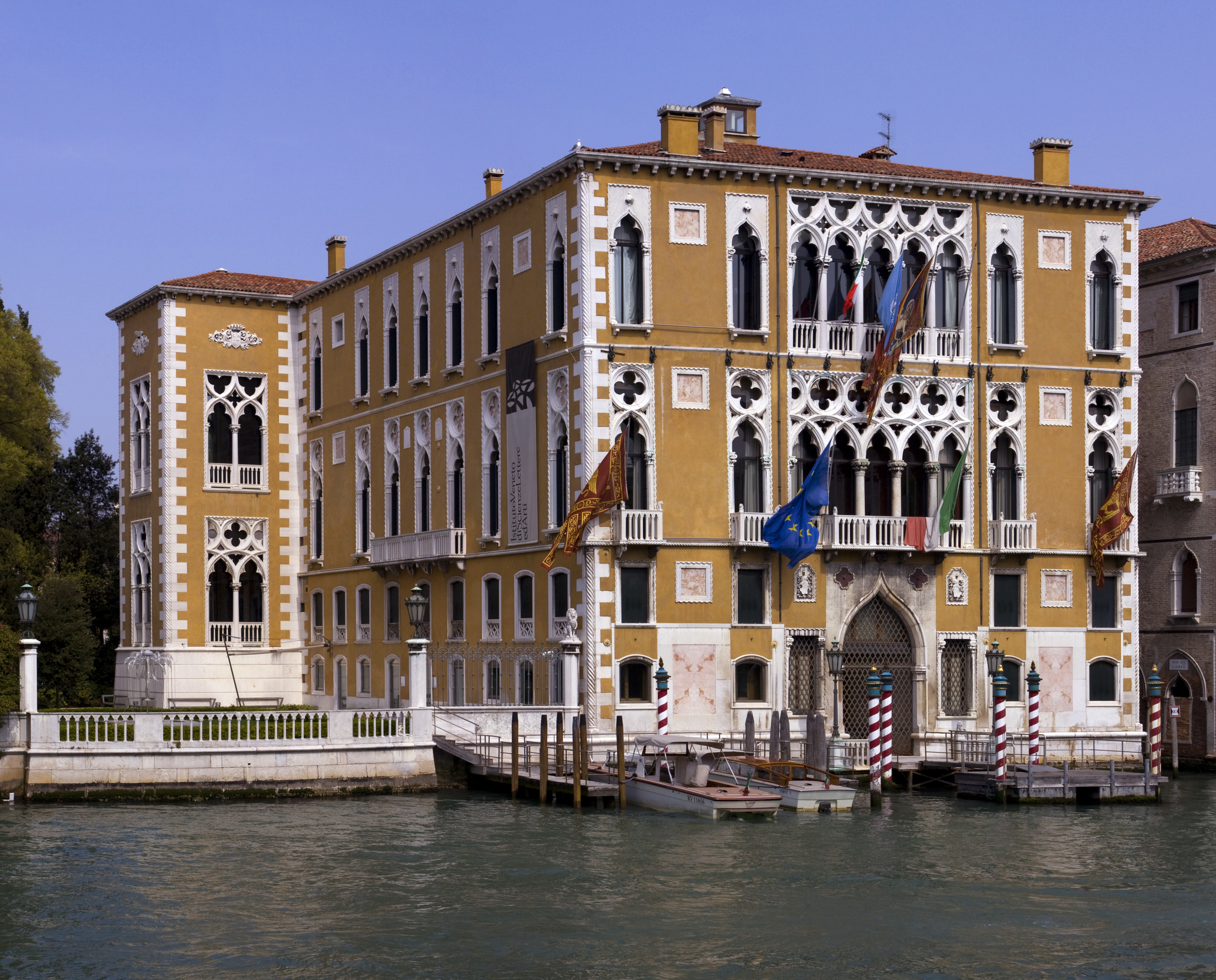
The Palazzo Cavalli-Franchetti is an example of Venetian Gothic architecture alongside the Grand Canal.

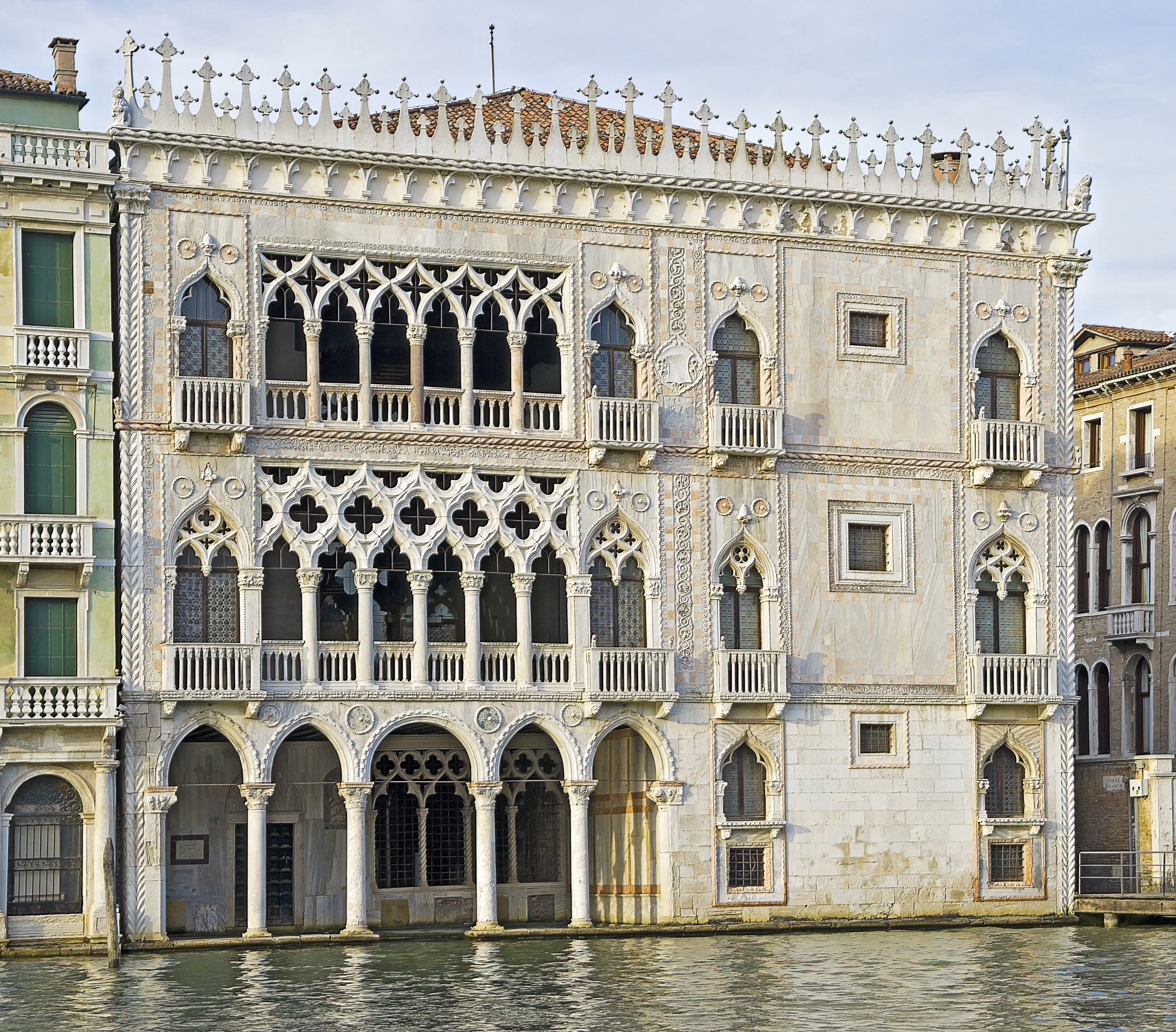
The Ca' d'Oro

Venice is built on unstable mud-banks, and had a very crowded city centre by the Middle Ages. On the other hand, the city was largely safe from riot, civil feuds, and invasion much earlier than most European cities. These factors, with the canals and the great wealth of the city, made for unique building styles.

Venice has a rich and diverse architectural style, the most prominent of which is the Gothic style. Venetian Gothic architecture is a term given to a Venetian building style combining the use of the Gothic lancet arch with the curved ogee arch, due to Byzantine and Ottoman influences. The style originated in 14th-century Venice, with a confluence of Byzantine style from Constantinople, Islamic influences from Spain and Venice's eastern trading partners, and early Gothic forms from mainland Italy. Chief examples of the style are the Doge's Palace and the Ca' d'Oro in the city. The city also has several Renaissance and Baroque buildings, including the Ca' Pesaro and the Ca' Rezzonico.

Venetian taste was conservative and Renaissance architecture only really became popular in buildings from about the 1470s. More than in the rest of Italy, it kept much of the typical form of the Gothic palazzi, which had evolved to suit Venetian conditions. In turn the transition to Baroque architecture was also fairly gentle. This gives the crowded buildings on the Grand Canal and elsewhere an essential harmony, even where buildings from very different periods sit together. For example, round-topped arches are far more common in Renaissance buildings than elsewhere.

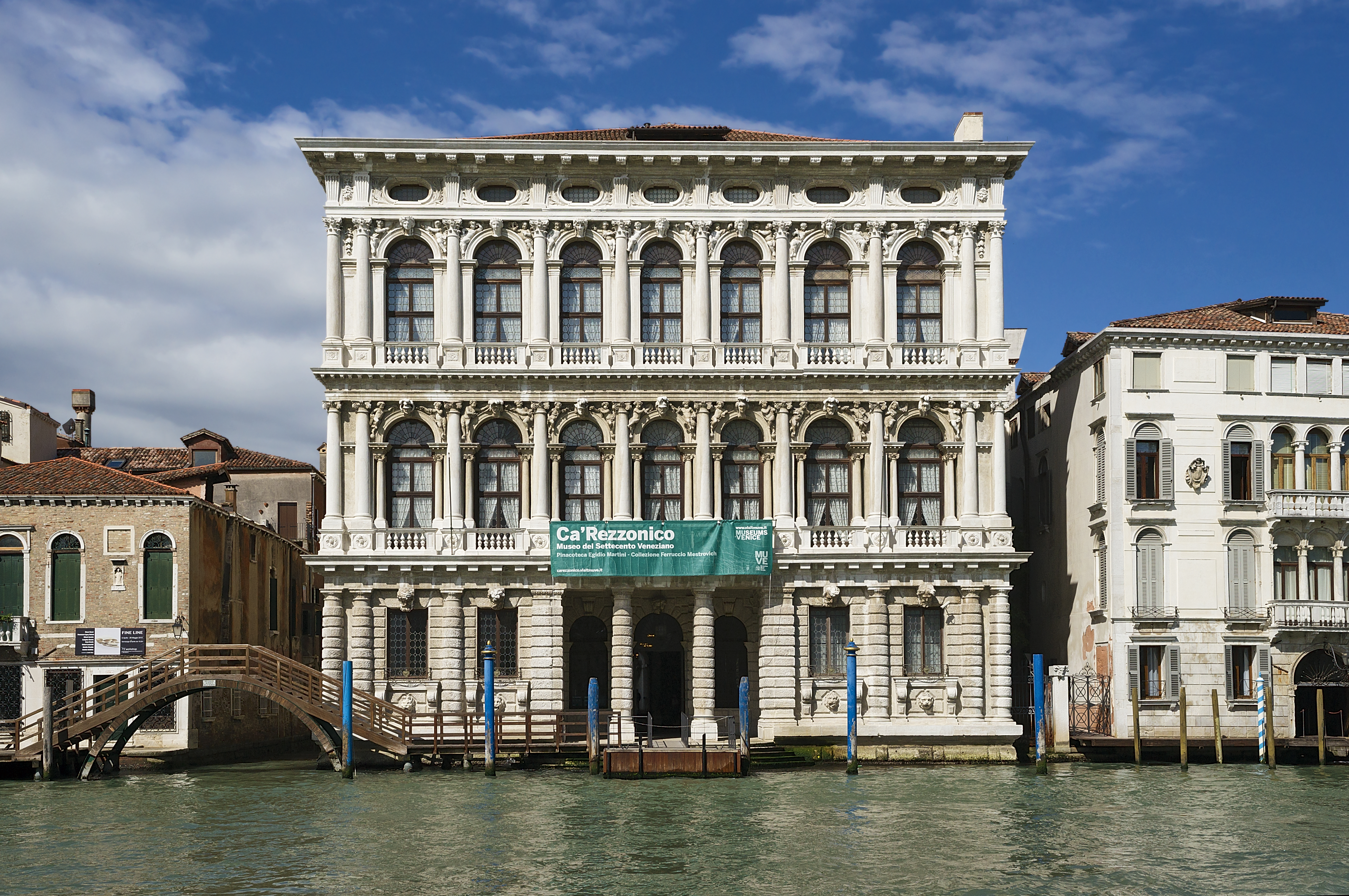
The Baroque Ca' Rezzonico

=== Rococo style ===
It can be argued that Venice produced the best and most refined Rococo designs. At the time, the Venetian economy was in decline. It had lost most of its maritime power, was lagging behind its rivals in political importance, and its society had become decadent, with tourism increasingly the mainstay of the economy. But Venice remained a centre of fashion. Venetian rococo was well known as rich and luxurious, with usually very extravagant designs. Unique Venetian furniture types included the divani da portego, and long rococo couches and pozzetti, objects meant to be placed against the wall. Bedrooms of rich Venetians were usually sumptuous and grand, with rich damask, velvet, and silk drapery and curtains, and beautifully carved rococo beds with statues of putti, flowers, and angels. Venice was especially known for its girandole mirrors, which remained among, if not the, finest in Europe. Chandeliers were usually very colourful, using Murano glass to make them look more vibrant and stand out from others; and precious stones and materials from abroad were used, since Venice still held a vast trade empire. Lacquer was very common, and many items of furniture were covered with it, the most noted being lacca povera (poor lacquer), in which allegories and images of social life were painted. Lacquerwork and Chinoiserie were particularly common in bureau cabinets.

=== Glass ===
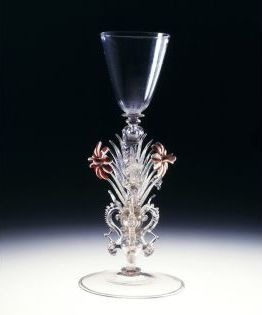
A Venetian glass goblet

Venice is known for its ornate glass-work, known as Venetian glass, which is world-renowned for being colourful, elaborate, and skillfully made. Many of the important characteristics of these objects had been developed by the 13th century. Toward the end of that century, the centre of the Venetian glass industry moved to Murano, an offshore island in Venice. The glass made there is known as Murano glass.

Byzantine craftsmen played an important role in the development of Venetian glass. When Constantinople was sacked in the Fourth Crusade in 1204, some fleeing artisans came to Venice; when the Ottomans took Constantinople in 1453, still more glassworkers arrived. By the 16th century, Venetian artisans had gained even greater control over the colour and transparency of their glass, and had mastered a variety of decorative techniques. Despite efforts to keep Venetian glassmaking techniques within Venice, they became known elsewhere, and Venetian-style glassware was produced in other Italian cities and other countries of Europe.

Some of the most important brands of glass in the world today are still produced in the historical glass factories on Murano. They are: Venini, Barovier & Toso, Pauly, Millevetri, and Seguso. Barovier & Toso is considered one of the 100 oldest companies in the world, formed in 1295.

In February 2021, the world learned that Venetian glass trade beads had been found at three prehistoric Inuit sites in Alaska, including Punyik Point. Uninhabited today, and located 1 mile (1.6 km) from the Continental Divide in the Brooks Range, the area was on ancient trade routes from the Bering Sea to the Arctic Ocean. From their creation in Venice, researchers believe the likely route these artifacts traveled was across Europe, then Eurasia and finally over the Bering Strait, making this discovery "the first documented instance of the presence of indubitable European materials in prehistoric sites in the western hemisphere as the result of overland transport across the Eurasian continent." After radiocarbon dating materials found near the beads, archaeologists estimated their arrival on the continent to sometime between 1440 and 1480, predating Christopher Columbus. The dating and provenance has been challenged by other researchers who point out that such beads were not made in Venice until the mid-16th century and that an early 17th century French origin is possible.

=== Festivals ===
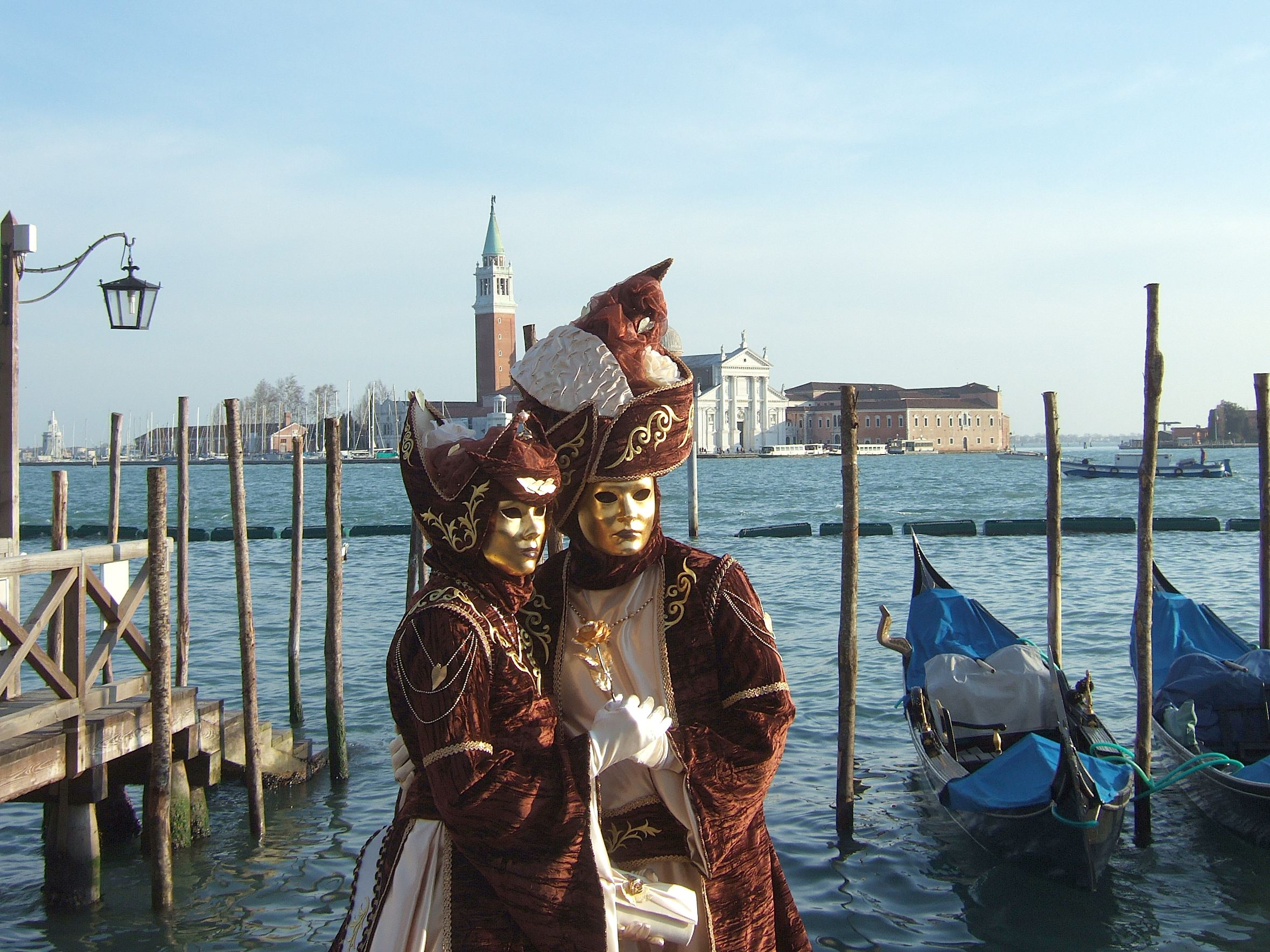
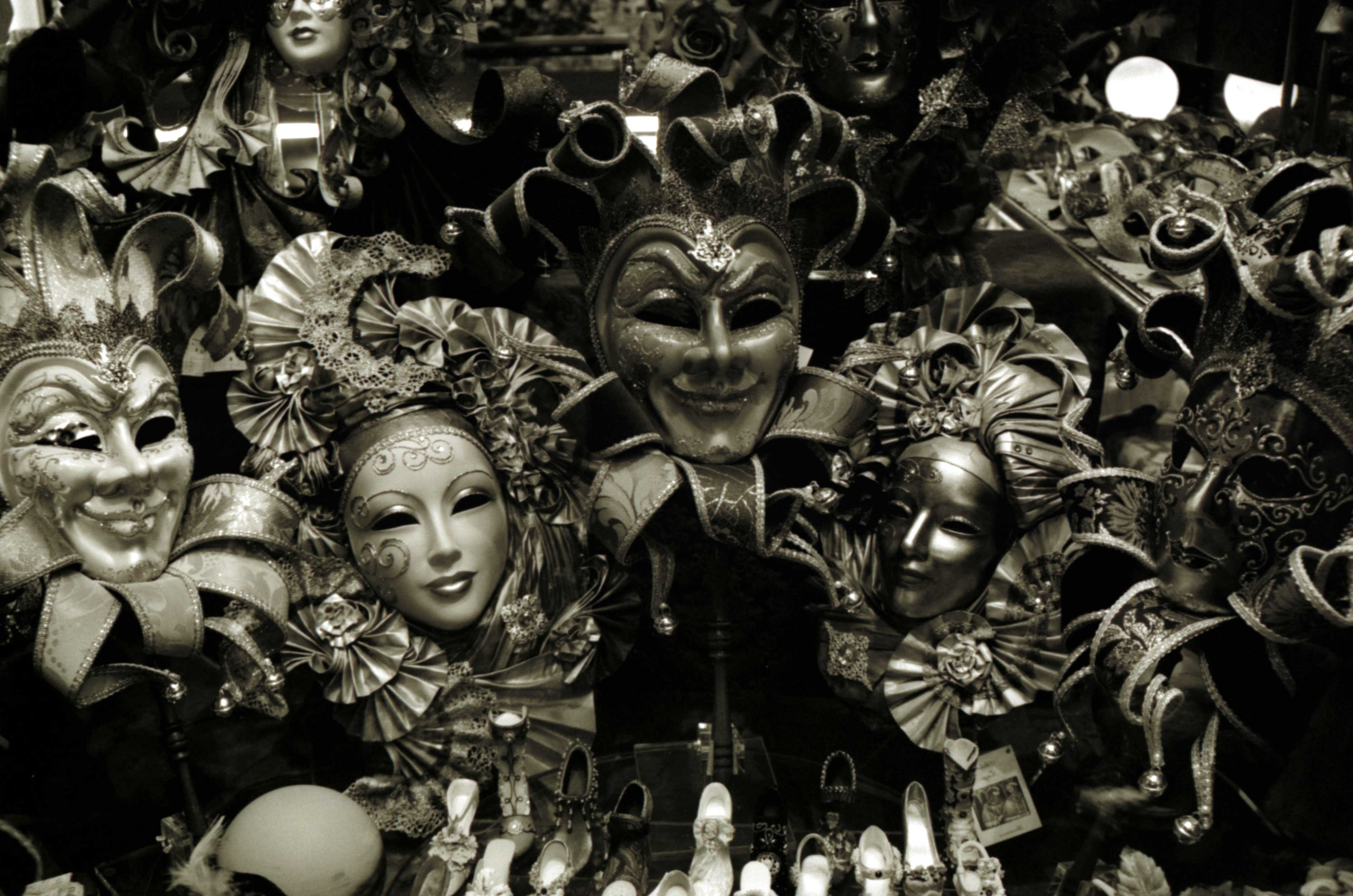
Typical masks worn during the Carnival of Venice

The Carnival of Venice is held annually in the city, It lasts for around two weeks and ends on Shrove Tuesday. Venetian masks are worn.

The Venice Biennale is one of the most important events in the arts calendar. In 1895 an Esposizione biennale artistica nazionale (biennial exhibition of Italian art) was inaugurated. In September 1942, the activities of the Biennale were interrupted by the war, but resumed in 1948.

The Festa del Redentore is held in mid-July. It began as a feast to give thanks for the end of the plague of 1576. A bridge of barges is built connecting Giudecca to the rest of Venice, and fireworks play an important role.

The Venice Film Festival (Italian: Mostra Internazionale d'Arte Cinematografica di Venezia) is the oldest film festival in the world. Founded by Count Giuseppe Volpi di Misurata in 1932 as the Esposizione Internazionale d'Arte Cinematografica, the festival has since taken place every year in late August or early September on the island of the Lido. Screenings take place in the historic Palazzo del Cinema on the Lungomare Marconi. It is one of the world's most prestigious film festivals and is part of the Venice Biennale.

=== Music ===
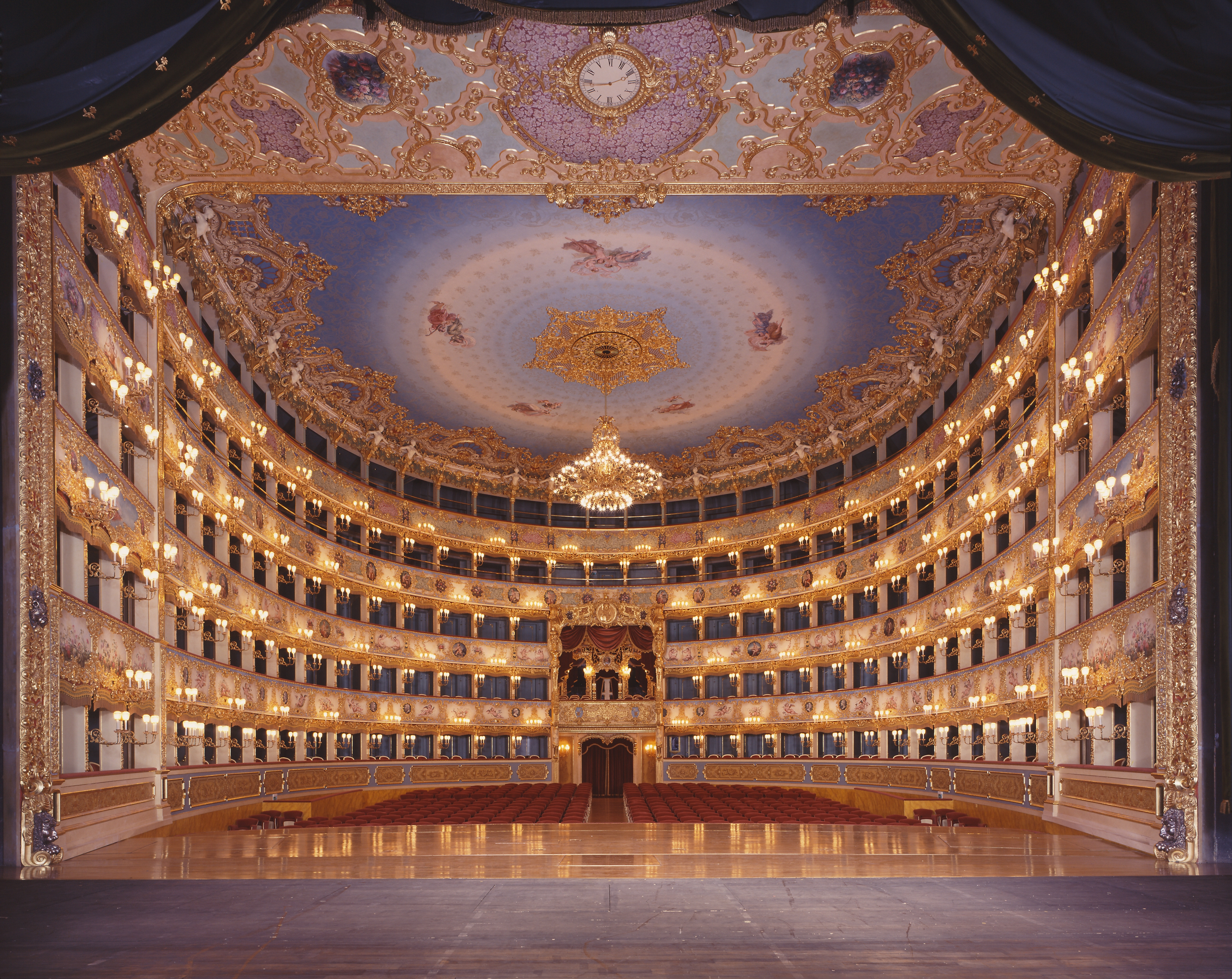
La Fenice opera house in the city

Venice has played an important role in the development of Italian music. The medieval Republic of Venice was often popularly called the "Republic of Music", and an anonymous Frenchman of the 17th century is said to have remarked that "In every [Venetian] home, someone is playing a musical instrument or singing. There is music everywhere."

During the 16th century, Venice became one of the most important musical centres of Europe, marked by a characteristic style of composition (the Venetian school) and the development of the Venetian polychoral style under composers such as Adrian Willaert, who worked at St Mark's Basilica. Venice was the early centre of music printing; Ottaviano Petrucci began publishing music almost as soon as this technology was available, and his publishing enterprise helped to attract composers from all over Europe, especially from France and Flanders. By the end of the century, Venice was known for the splendor of its music, as exemplified in the "colossal style" of Andrea and Giovanni Gabrieli, which used multiple choruses and instrumental groups. Venice was also the home of many noted composers during the baroque period, such as Antonio Vivaldi, Tomaso Albinoni, Ippolito Ciera, Giovanni Picchi, and Girolamo Dalla Casa, to name but a few.

==== Orchestras ====
Venice is the home of numerous orchestras such as, the Orchestra della Fenice, Rondò Veneziano, Interpreti Veneziani, and Venice Baroque Orchestra.

=== Cinema, media, and popular culture ===
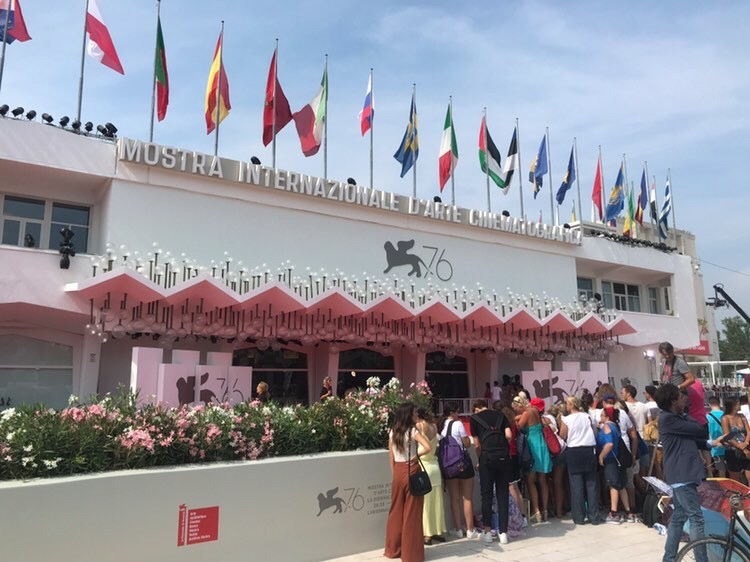
The Venice Film Festival is the oldest film festival in the world and one of the most prestigious and publicized.

The city has been the setting or chosen location of numerous films, games, works of fine art and literature (including essays, fiction, non-fiction, and poems), music videos, television shows, and other cultural references. Notable examples of this are the films Indiana Jones and the Last Crusade and Casino Royale, the second, and fifth part of the Japanese manga series JoJo's Bizarre Adventure and the video game Sly 3: Honor Among Thieves.

=== Photography ===
Fulvio Roiter was the pioneer in artistic photography in Venice, followed by a number of photographers whose works are often reproduced on postcards, thus reaching a widest international popular exposure. Luca Zordan, a New York City based photographer was born in Venice.

=== Cuisine ===
Venetian cuisine is characterized by seafood, but also includes garden products from Sant'Erasmo island, rice from the mainland, game, and polenta. Venice is not known for a particular cuisine of its own: it combines local traditions with influences stemming from age-old contacts with distant countries. These include sarde in saór (sardines marinated to preserve them for long voyages); bacalà mantecato (a recipe based on Norwegian stockfish and extra-virgin olive oil); bisàto (marinated eel); risi e bisi – rice, peas and (unsmoked) bacon; fegato alla veneziana, Venetian-style veal liver; risi e bisi (rice and beans); risòto col néro de sépe (risotto with cuttlefish, blackened by their own ink); cichéti, refined and delicious tidbits (akin to tapas); antipasti (appetizers); and prosecco, sparkling light -body white wine.

In addition, Venice is known for the golden, oval-shaped cookies called baìcoli, and for other types of sweets, such as: pan del pescaór (bread of the fisherman); cookies with almonds and pistachio nuts; cookies with fried Venetian cream, or the bussolài (butter biscuits and shortbread made in the shape of a ring or an "S") from the island of Burano; the galàni or cróstoli (angel wings); (Note: In other areas of Italy similar sweets are known by many other names, e.g. cénci (rags) in Florence, frappe (flounces) in Rome, bugìe (lies) in Turin, Genoa, etc., chiàcchiere (chatter) in Milan and many other places in northern, central and southern Italy. Vid.: Pellegrino Artusi, La Scienza in cucina e l'Arte di mangiar bene, 93ª ristampa, Firenze, Giunti, 1960, p. 387, #595; Ranieri da Mosto, Il Veneto in cucina, Firenze, Aldo Martello-Giunti, 1974, p. 364; Luigi Veronelli (edited by), Il Carnacina, 10th ed., Milano, Garzanti, 1975, p. 656, #2013; to name but a few.) the frìtole (fried spherical doughnuts); the fregolòtta (a crumbly cake with almonds); a milk pudding called rosàda; and cookies called zaléti, whose ingredients include yellow maize flour.

The dessert tiramisù is generally thought to have been invented in Treviso in the 1970s, and is popular in the Veneto area.

=== Fashion and shopping ===
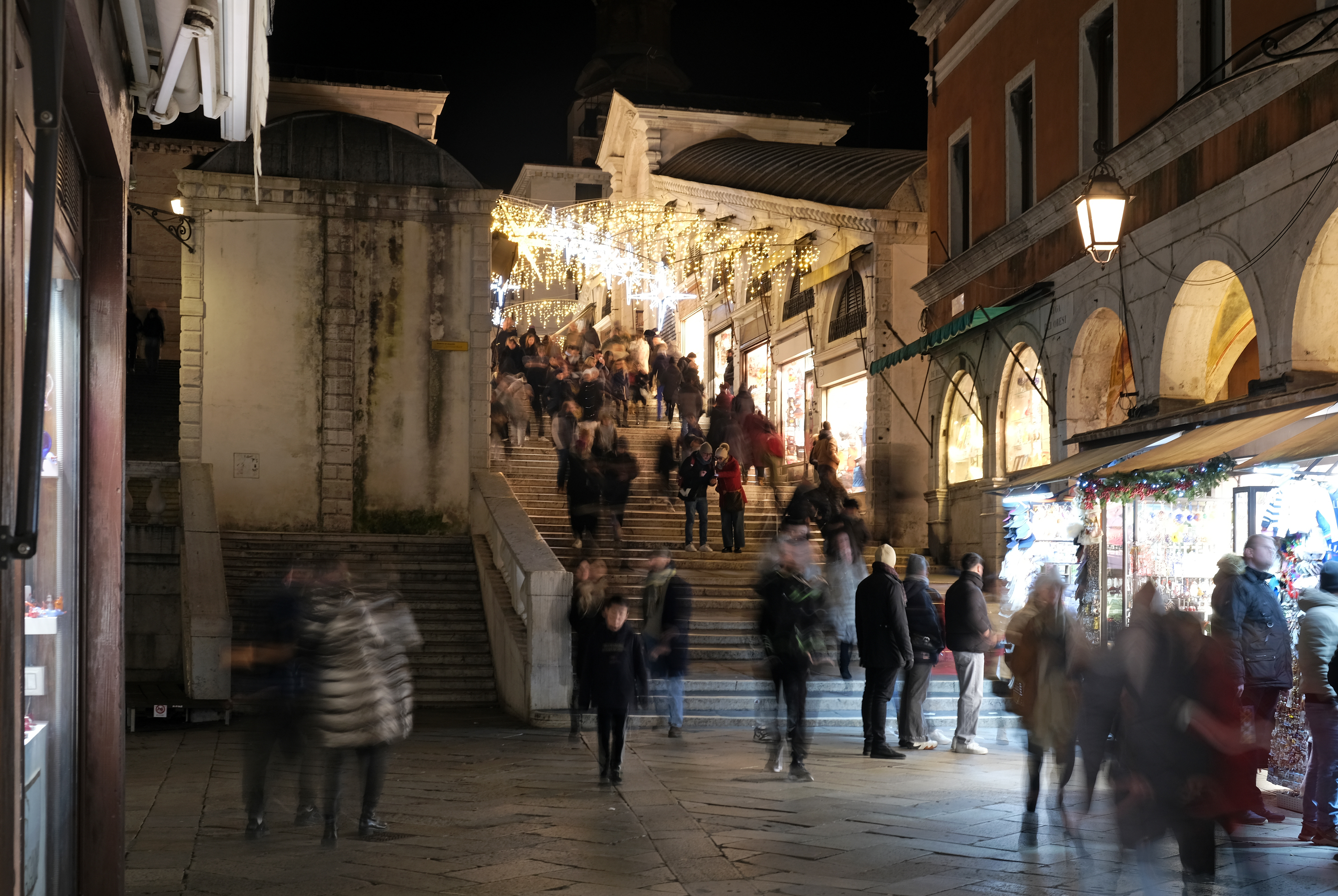
Luxury shops and boutiques along the Rialto Bridge

In the 14th century, many young Venetian men began wearing tight-fitting multicoloured hose, the designs on which indicated the Compagnie della Calza ("Trouser Club") to which they belonged. The Venetian Senate passed sumptuary laws, but these merely resulted in changes in fashion in order to circumvent the law. Dull garments were worn over colourful ones, which then were cut to show the hidden colours resulting in the spread of men's "slashed" fashions in the 15th century.

Today, Venice is a major fashion and shopping centre; not as important as Milan, Florence, and Rome, but on a par with Verona, Turin, Vicenza, Naples, and Genoa. Roberta di Camerino is the only major Italian fashion brand to be based in Venice. Founded in 1945, it is renowned for its innovative handbags made by Venetian artisans and often covered in locally woven velvet.

== Sport ==
The most famous Venetian sport is probably Voga alla Veneta ("Venetian-style rowing"), also commonly called voga veneta. A technique invented in the Venetian Lagoon, Venetian rowing is unusual in that the rower(s), one or more, row standing, looking forward. Today, Voga alla Veneta is not only the way the gondoliers row tourists around Venice but also the way Venetians row for pleasure and sport. Many races called regata(e) happen throughout the year. The culminating event of the rowing season is the day of the "Regata Storica", which occurs on the first Sunday of September each year.

The main football club in the city is Venezia FC, founded in 1907, which currently plays in the Serie A. Their ground, the Stadio Pier Luigi Penzo, situated in Sant'Elena, is the second-oldest continually used stadium in Italy.

The local basketball club is Reyer Venezia, founded in 1872 as the gymnastics club Società Sportiva Costantino Reyer, and in 1907 as the basketball club. Reyer currently plays in the Lega Basket Serie A. The men's team were the Italian champions in 1942, 1943, 2017 and 2019. Their arena is the Palasport Giuseppe Taliercio, situated in Mestre. Luigi Brugnaro is president of the club.

== International relations ==
=== Twin towns – sister cities ===
Venice is twinned with:

- Bangkok, Thailand
- Dubrovnik, Croatia
- Hiroshima, Japan
- Huế, Vietnam
- Istanbul, Turkey
- Le Havre, France
- Palembang, Indonesia
- Saint Petersburg, Russia
- Sarajevo, Bosnia and Herzegovina
- Suzhou, China
- Tallinn, Estonia
- Yerevan, Armenia

In 2013, Venice announced that it wants to end the sister city relationship with St. Petersburg in opposition to laws Russia had passed against homosexuals and those who support gay rights.

=== Cooperation agreements ===
In January 2000, the City of Venice and the Central Association of Cities and Communities of Greece (KEDKE) established, in pursuance to EC Regulation No. 2137/85, the Marco Polo System European Economic Interest Grouping (E.E.I.G.), to promote and realise European projects within transnational cultural and tourist fields, particularly in reference to the preservation and safeguarding of artistic and architectural heritage.

In April 2001, the city signed an agreement with the office of cultural promotion and cooperation of the Ministry of Foreign Affairs to coordinate efforts at promoting Italian culture abroad.

Venice also has cooperation agreements with:

- Lübeck, Germany (1979)
- Nuremberg, Germany (1999)
- Qingdao, China (2001, Science and Technology Partnership)
- Thessaloniki, Greece (2003)
- Miami, United States (2020)

=== Places named after Venice ===
The name "Venezuela" is a Spanish diminutive of Venice (Veneziola).
Many additional places around the world are named after Venice, such as:

- Venice, Los Angeles, home of Venice Beach
- Venice, Alberta, in Canada
- Venice, Florida, city in Sarasota County
- Venice, Louisiana
- Little Venice, London

== Notable people ==
Others closely associated with the city include:

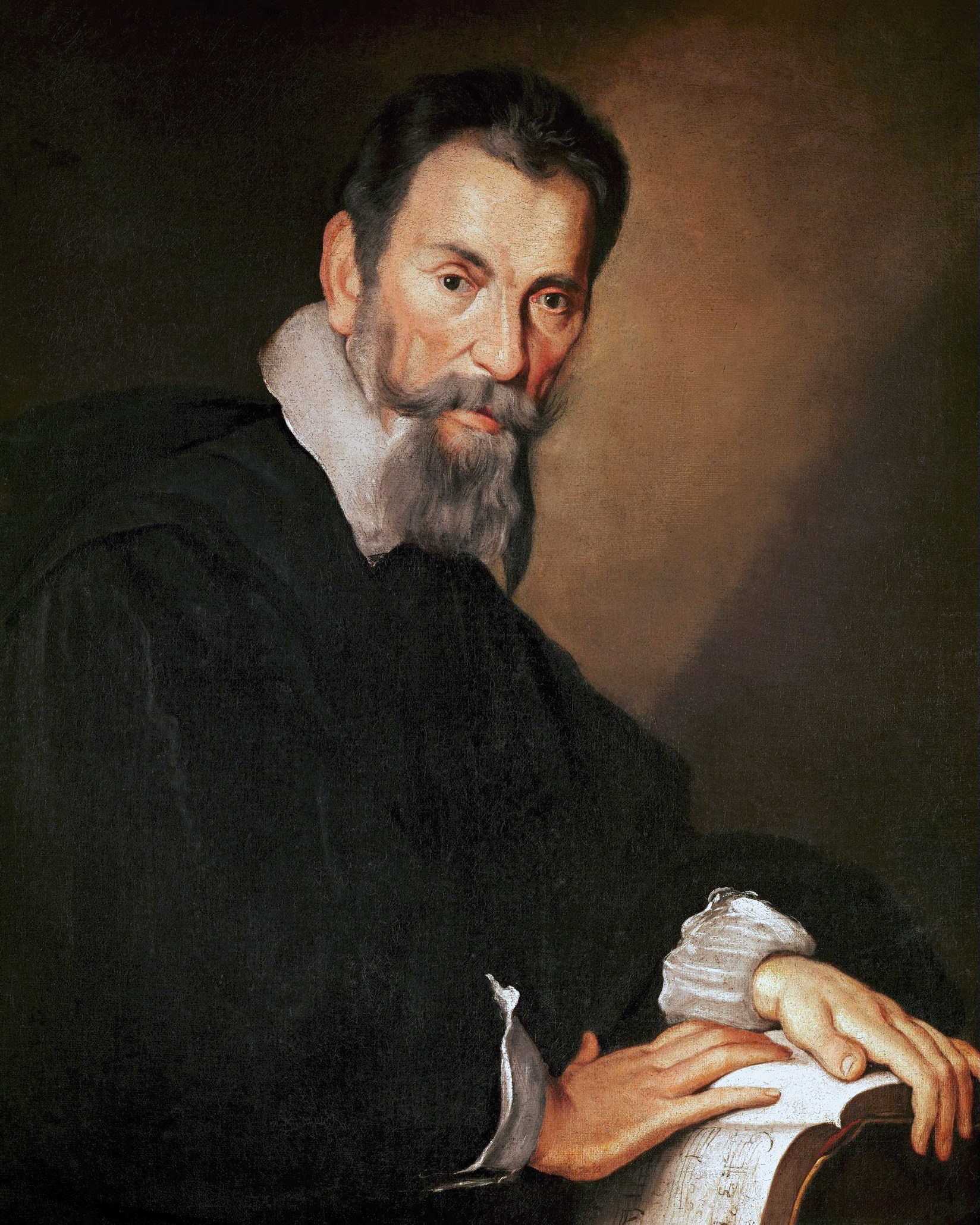
Claudio Monteverdi, c. 1630

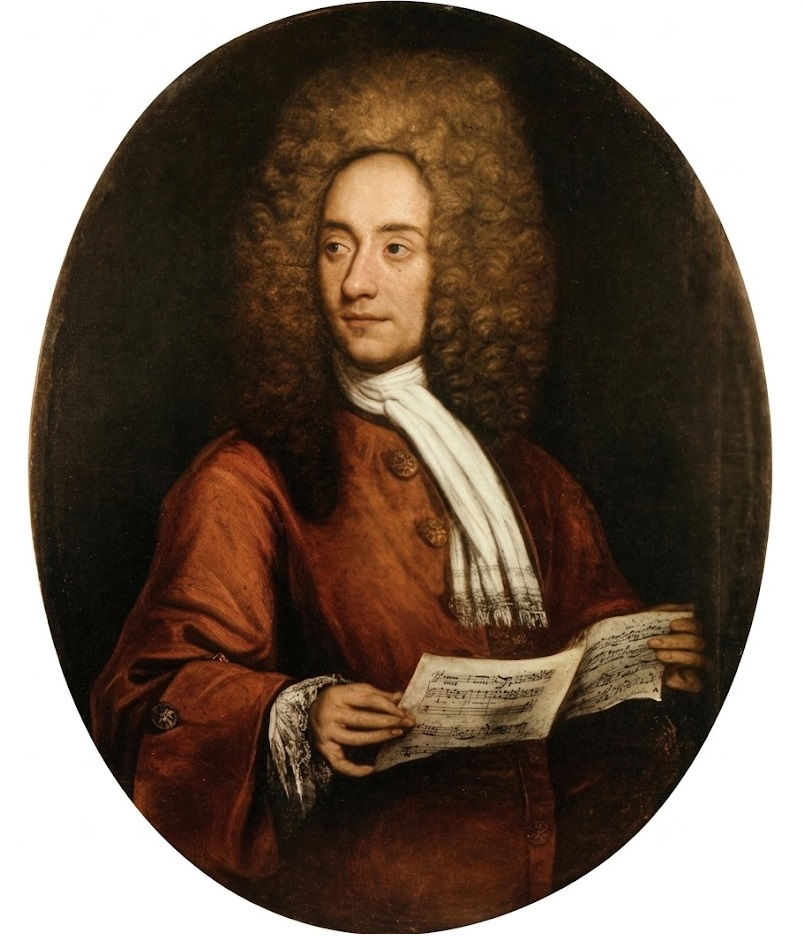
Tomaso Albinoni

=== Music ===
- Andrea Gabrieli (c. 1510–1586), Italian composer and organist at St Mark's Basilica
- Giovanni Gabrieli (1554/1557–1612), composer and organist at St Mark's Basilica
- Claudio Monteverdi (1567–1643), composer, string player, choirmaster and Catholic priest
- Francesco Cavalli (1602–1676), baroque composer
- Barbara Strozzi (1619–1677), composer and singer
- Teofilo Macchetti (1632–1714) composer, music historian, and choirmaster
- Tomaso Albinoni (1671–1751), baroque composer
- Antonio Vivaldi (1678–1741), composer and violinist of the Baroque Era
- Domenico Montagnana (1686–1750), Italian master luthier. He made the violin and cello.
- Pietro Guarneri (1695–1762), luthier, settled in Venice 1717, Peter of Venice
- Lorenzo Da Ponte (1749–1838), opera librettist and poet. He wrote the librettos for 28 operas by 11 composers, including Wolfgang Amadeus Mozart.
- Domenico Dragonetti (1763–1846), double bass virtuoso and composer
- Ermanno Wolf-Ferrari (1876–1948), Italian composer, mostly of comic opera
- Virgilio Ranzato (1883–1937), Italian composer and violinist
- Bruno Maderna (1920–1973), Italian-German orchestra director and music composer
- Luigi Nono (1924–1990), leading composer of instrumental and electronic music
- Giuseppe Sinopoli (1946–2001), conductor and composer
- Claudio Ambrosini (born 1948), composer and conductor
- Giovanni Gallo (fl. 1726 – c. 1749), Italian choreographer of ballets within operas

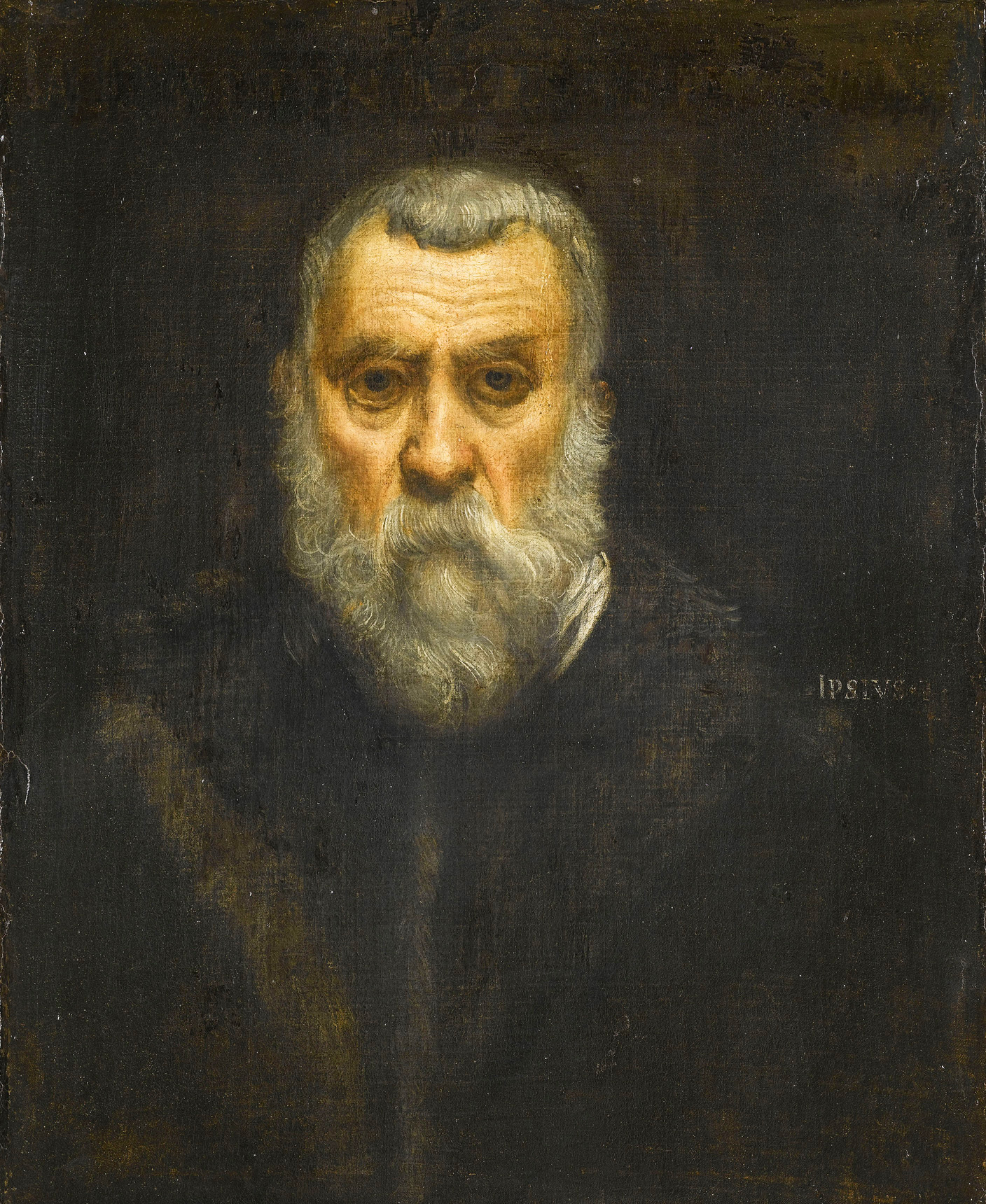
Tintoretto, self portrait, 1588

=== Painting ===
- Giovanni Bellini (c. 1430 – 1516), Renaissance painter from the Bellini family of painters
- Vittore Carpaccio (c. 1465 – 1525/1526), Italian painter of the Venetian school
- Lorenzo Lotto (c. 1480 – 1556), painter, draughtsman and illustrator, in the Venetian school
- Sebastiano del Piombo (c. 1485 – 1547), High Renaissance painter and early Mannerist
- Titian (c. 1488/90 – 1576), leader of the Venetian school of the Italian Renaissance
- Tintoretto (1518–1594), the last great painter of Italian Renaissance
- Baldassare d'Anna (c. 1560 – after 1639), painter of the late-Renaissance period
- Niccolò Cassana (1659–1714), late-Baroque painter
- Rosalba Carriera (1675–1757), Rococo painter, known for her pastel works
- Giovanni Battista Tiepolo (1696–1770), painter and printmaker. He painted in the Rococo style, Venetian school.
- Canaletto (1697–1768), painter, known for his landscapes or vedute of Venice
- Pietro Longhi (c. 1702 – 1785), painter of contemporary genre scenes of life
- Giuseppe Santomaso (1907–1990), Italian painter
- Emilio Vedova (1919–2006), an important modern painter of Italy
- Ludovico de Luigi (born 1933), Venetian Surrealistic artist

=== Writing ===
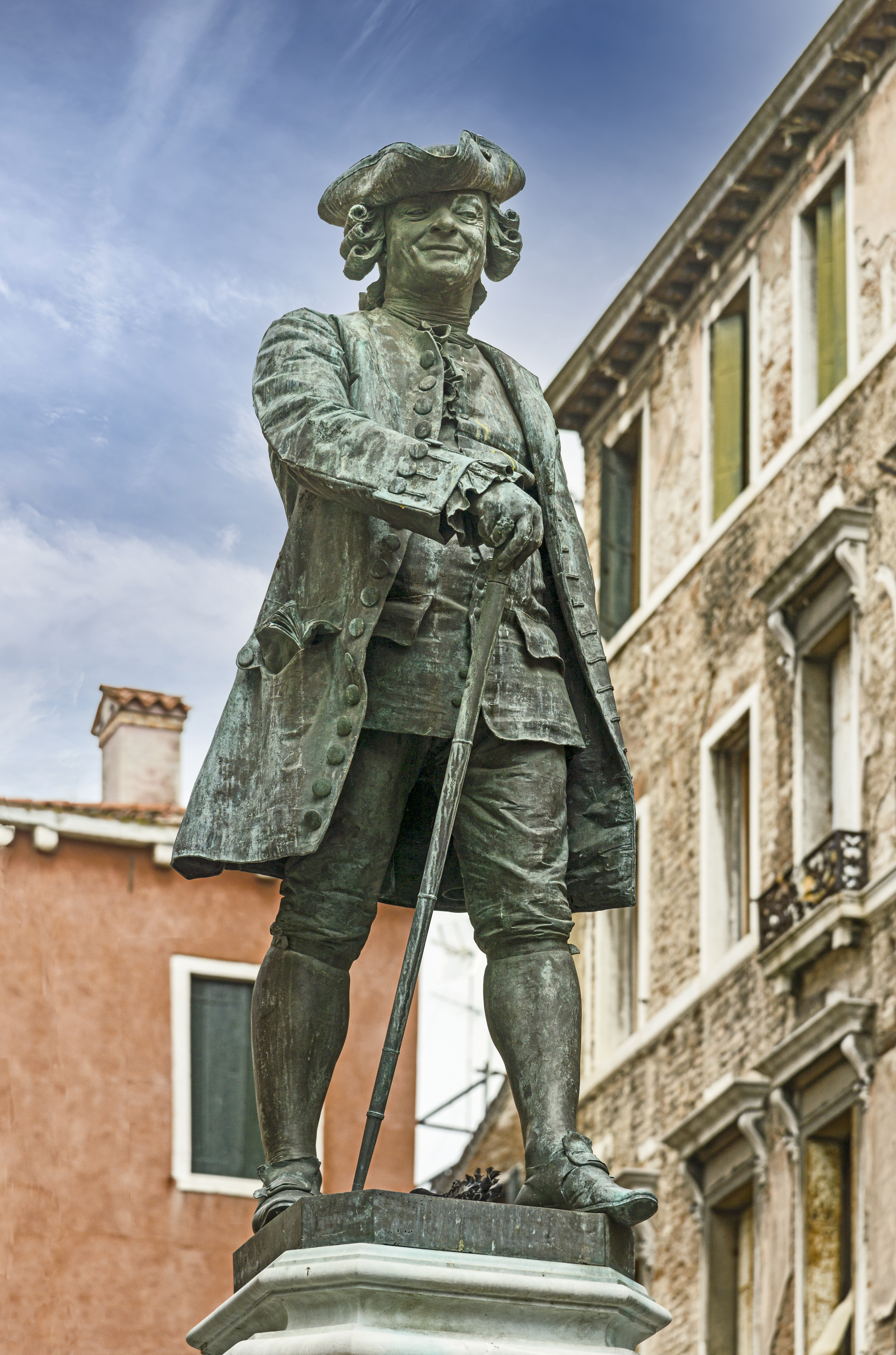
Carlo Goldoni, notable name in Italian theatre

- Christine de Pizan (1364 – c. 1430), poet and court writer for King Charles VI of France
- Aldus Manutius (1449–1515), an important printer. He founded the Aldine Press.
- Jean-Antoine de Baïf (1532–1589), French poet and member of La Pléiade
- Veronica Franco (1546–1591), poet and courtesan during the Renaissance
- Paolo Sarpi (1552–1623), historian, scientist, canon lawyer, statesman, defender of the liberties of Republican Venice. His writings inspired Thomas Hobbes, Edward Gibbon, and the founding fathers of the United States.
- Leon Modena (1571–1648), author, poet and preacher, active in the Venetian Ghetto
- Carlo Goldoni (1707–1793), playwright and librettist, notable name in Italian theatre
- Carlo Gozzi (1720–1806), playwright and champion of commedia dell'arte
- Elisabetta Caminèr Turra (1751–1796), writer and translator of foreign plays
- Frederick Rolfe (1860–1913), English author of the Venetian novel The Desire and Pursuit of the Whole

=== Doges & public servants ===
The Doge Andrea Gritti, portrait by Titian

- Enrico Dandolo (c. 1107 – 1205), Doge of Venice from 1192 to his death. He played a direct role in the Sack of Constantinople during the Fourth Crusade.
- Pope Eugene IV (1383–1447), pope, 1431–1447, nephew of Pope Gregory XII
- Pope Paul II (1417–1471), pope, 1464–1471. He succeeded Pope Pius II.
- Andrea Gritti (1455–1538), Doge of the Venetian Republic from 1523 to 1538
- Pietro Bembo (1470–1547), scholar, poet, literary theorist and cardinal
- Sebastiano Venier (c. 1496 – 1578), Doge of Venice from 11 June 1577 to 1578
- Marco Antonio Bragadin (died 1571), general, flayed alive by the Turks after a fierce resistance during the siege of Famagusta
- Elena Lucrezia Cornaro Piscopia (1646–1684), the first woman in the world to receive a doctorate degree
- Jacopo Riccati (1676–1754), a Venetian mathematician. He wrote the Riccati equation.
- Pope Clement XIII (1693–1769), pope, 1758 to his death in 1769
- Count Vincenzo Dandolo (1758–1819), chemist, agronomist and politician of the Enlightenment Era
- Daniele Manin (1804–1857), Italian patriot, statesman and leader of the Risorgimento in Venice
- Isacco Pesaro Maurogonato (1817–1892), financier and politician
- Nurbanu Sultan (1525–1583), Haseki sultan and the Valide sultan of the Ottoman Empire and the daughter of the first cousin of Sebastiano Venier, Doge of Venice.

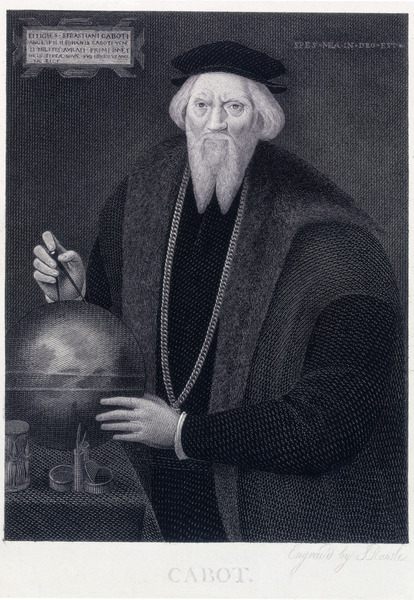
Engraving of Sebastian Cabot by Hans Holbein, 1824

=== Explorers ===
- Marco Polo (c. 1254 – 1324), trader and explorer, one of the first Westerners to travel the Silk Road to China
- Sebastian Cabot (c. 1484 – 1557), explorer
- Pietro Cesare Alberti (1608–1655), first Italian-American in New Amsterdam in 1635
- Giacomo Casanova (1725–1798 in Dux, Bohemia), Venetian adventurer, writer and womanizer

=== Architects ===
- Leon Battista Alberti (1404–1472), architect, humanist author, artist, poet, priest, linguist, philosopher and cryptographer
- Baldassare Longhena (1598–1682), exponent of Baroque architecture
- Andrea Tirali (c. 1660 – 1737), architect. He designed the pavement in the Piazza San Marco
- Giovanni Battista Meduna (1800–1886), architect, led reconstruction and restoration works of the St Mark's Basilica and the Gran Teatro La Fenice, among others
- Carlo Scarpa (1906–1978), architect with a profound understanding of materials

=== Entertainers ===
- Marietta Zanfretta (1837–1898), high-wire dancer who found success in Europe and the USA
- Romano Scarpa (1927–2005), noted Italian creator of Disney comics
- Francesco Borgato (born 1990), Italian recording artist and dancer

=== Sport ===
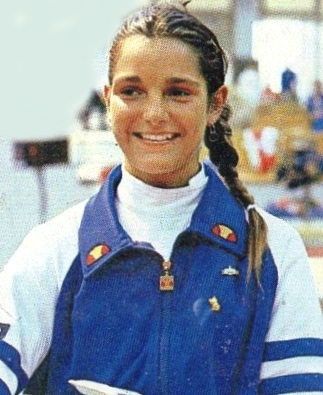
Dorina Vaccaroni, 1986

- Ercole Olgeni (1883–1947), rower, team gold and silver medallist at the 1920 & 1924 Summer Olympics
- Erminio Dones (1887–1945), rower, team silver medallist at the 1920 Summer Olympics
- Dominic DeNucci (1932–2021), Italian-American professional wrestler
- Angelo Spanio (1939–1999), Italian footballer with over 280 club caps
- Ivano Bordon (born 1951), former football goalkeeper with 449 club caps and 21 for Italy
- Roberto Ravaglia (born 1957), racing driver and founder of ROAL Motorsport
- Alessandro Santin (born 1958), racing driver
- Mauro Numa (born 1961), fencer and gold medallist at the 1984 Summer Olympics
- Andrea Borella (born 1961), fencer, team gold medallist at the 1984 Summer Olympics
- Andrea Cipressa (born 1963), fencer, team gold medallist at the 1984 Summer Olympics
- Dorina Vaccaroni (born 1963), former foil fencer, three time medallist at the 1984, 1988 & 1992 Summer Olympics
- Daniele Scarpa (born 1964), sprint canoer, gold and silver medallist at the 1996 Summer Olympics
- Carolina Morace (born 1964), former footballer with over 220 club caps and 150 for Italy women
- Giuseppe Cipriani (born 1965), racing driver
- Tommaso Rocchi (born 1977), former footballer with 664 club caps
- Giovanni Paramithiotti, founding chairmen and owner of Inter Milan football club

== See also ==
- List of islands of Italy
- List of buildings and structures in Venice
- List of bridges in Venice
- List of churches in Venice
- List of car-free places
- List of painters and architects of Venice
- Outline of Italy
- Su e zo per i ponti
- Venetian blinds
- Venetic language – the ancient spoken language of the region
- Venezia Mestre Rugby FC – a rugby team
- Venice of the East
- Venice of the North
- Venice of the South
