= 1966 flood of the Arno =

November 1966 flood of the river Arno in Tuscany, Italy

The 1966 flood of the Arno (Italian: Alluvione di Firenze del 4 novembre 1966) in Florence killed 35 people and damaged or destroyed millions of masterpieces of art and rare books. It is considered the worst flood in the city's history since 1557. With the combined effort of Italian and foreign volunteers alike, or angeli del fango ("Mud Angels"), many of these fine works have been restored. New methods in conservation were devised and restoration laboratories established. However, even decades later, much work remains to be done.

== Overview ==
Located in the Tuscany region of Central Italy, the river Arno is approximately 240 kilometres (150 mi) long. It flows from the Mount Falterona hills of the Apennine Mountains to the Ligurian Sea, just 11 kilometres (7 mi) west of Pisa. Lush vineyards and olive groves line the river's scenic course to the west, out to sea. Principally utilized for irrigation purposes, only 32 kilometres (20 mi) of the river is used for navigation.

The highest flows of the river generally occur in spring and autumn of every year, when rainfall in the Apennines is at its greatest. The intensity of the 1966 flood was further increased by both the topography of the Apennines, which contributed to the high run-off rates and river discharges, and urban development. Roads, such as the Via dei Calzaiuoli, served as narrow channels for floodwaters, allowing for their greater speed and destruction within the city; bridges, on the other hand, hindered river flow where it was needed, allowing water to pour over the floodplain with great force.

== Timeline of events ==
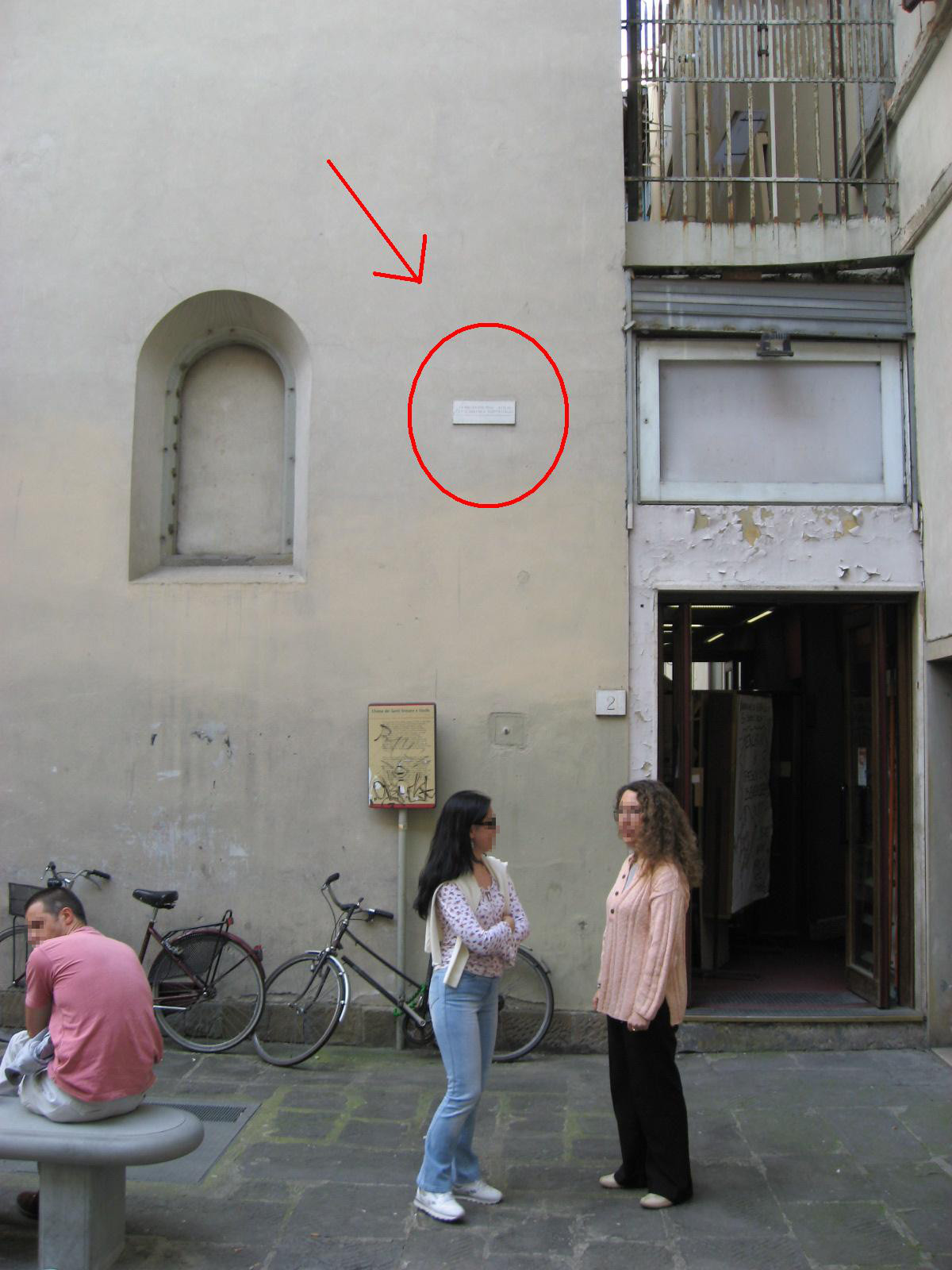
Square in Florence with a white high water mark of the 1966 flood. At this point the marker is about 4 metres (13 ft) high.

=== 3 November ===
- After a long period of steady rain, the Levane and La Penna dams in Valdarno began to discharge more than 2,000 cubic metres (71,000 cu ft) of water per second toward Florence.
- At 14:30, the Civil Engineering Department reported "'an exceptional quantity of water.'"
- Cellars in the Santa Croce and San Frediano areas began to flood.
- Police received calls for assistance from villagers up the Arno Valley.
- The flood's first victim, a 52-year-old worker, died at the Anconella water treatment plant.

=== 4 November ===
- At 2:00, the banks of the Mugnone broke, flooding the farm buildings and killing 70 thoroughbreds at the racecourse as well as all the animals in the zoo
- At 04:00, engineers, fearing that the Valdarno dam would burst, discharged a mass of water that eventually reached the outskirts of Florence at a rate of 60 kilometres per hour (37 mph).
- At 07:26, the Lungarno delle Grazie cut off gas, electricity and water supplies to affected areas.
- By 08:00, army barracks were flooded.
- By 09:00, hospital emergency generators (the only source of electrical power remaining) failed.
- Landslides obstructed roads leading to Florence, while narrow streets within city limits funneled floodwaters, increasing their height and velocity.
- By 09:45, the Piazza del Duomo was flooded.
- At 11:00 the BBC announces the news from London
- The powerful waters ruptured central heating oil tanks, and the oil mixed with the water and mud, causing greater damage.
- Florence was divided in two, and officials were unable to immediately reach citizens of the city past the Piazzale Michelangelo.
- At its highest, the water reached over 6.7 metres (22 ft) in the Santa Croce area.
- By 20:00, the water began to lower.

== Impact ==
The flood has had a lasting impact on Florence, economically and culturally. City officials and citizens were unprepared for the storm and the widespread devastation that it caused. There were virtually no emergency measures in place, at least partially because Florence is located in an area where the frequency of flooding is relatively low. In fact, approximately 90% of the city's population were completely unaware of the imminent disaster.

Residents were set to celebrate their country's World War I victory over Austria on 4 November, Armed Forces Day. In commemoration, businesses were closed and many of their employees were out of town for the public holiday. While many lives were likely spared as a result, the locked buildings greatly inhibited the salvaging of valuable materials from numerous institutions and shops, with the exception of a number of jewellery stores whose owners were warned by their nightwatchmen.

6,000 shops were destroyed, more than 70,000 families were left homeless, 20,000 cars were immersed in the water and mud, and thousands of workshops, factories, laboratories and stores were flooded. Approximately 600,000 tons of mud, rubble and sewage severely damaged or destroyed numerous collections of books, manuscripts and fine art. It is estimated that between 3 and 4 million books and manuscripts were damaged, as well as 14,000 movable works of art.

Artist Marco Sassone, in a 1969 interview, recalled the impact of the flood on Florence's residents: "The only thing you could do was watch and be helpless. Nature was master...the women became crazy with fear. They began throwing things from the windows and screaming 'who is going to save my children?'" It was reported that 101 people lost their lives in the flood waters.

Paul Conway, in Flood in Florence, 1966: Fifty-Year Retrospective (2018), notes that "the broad effects of the Florence Flood from 1966 to the present, fifty years later, are perhaps not clearly measurable," yet emphasise that "many changes in professional practice can be attributed to the work of recovery."

=== Collections affected ===
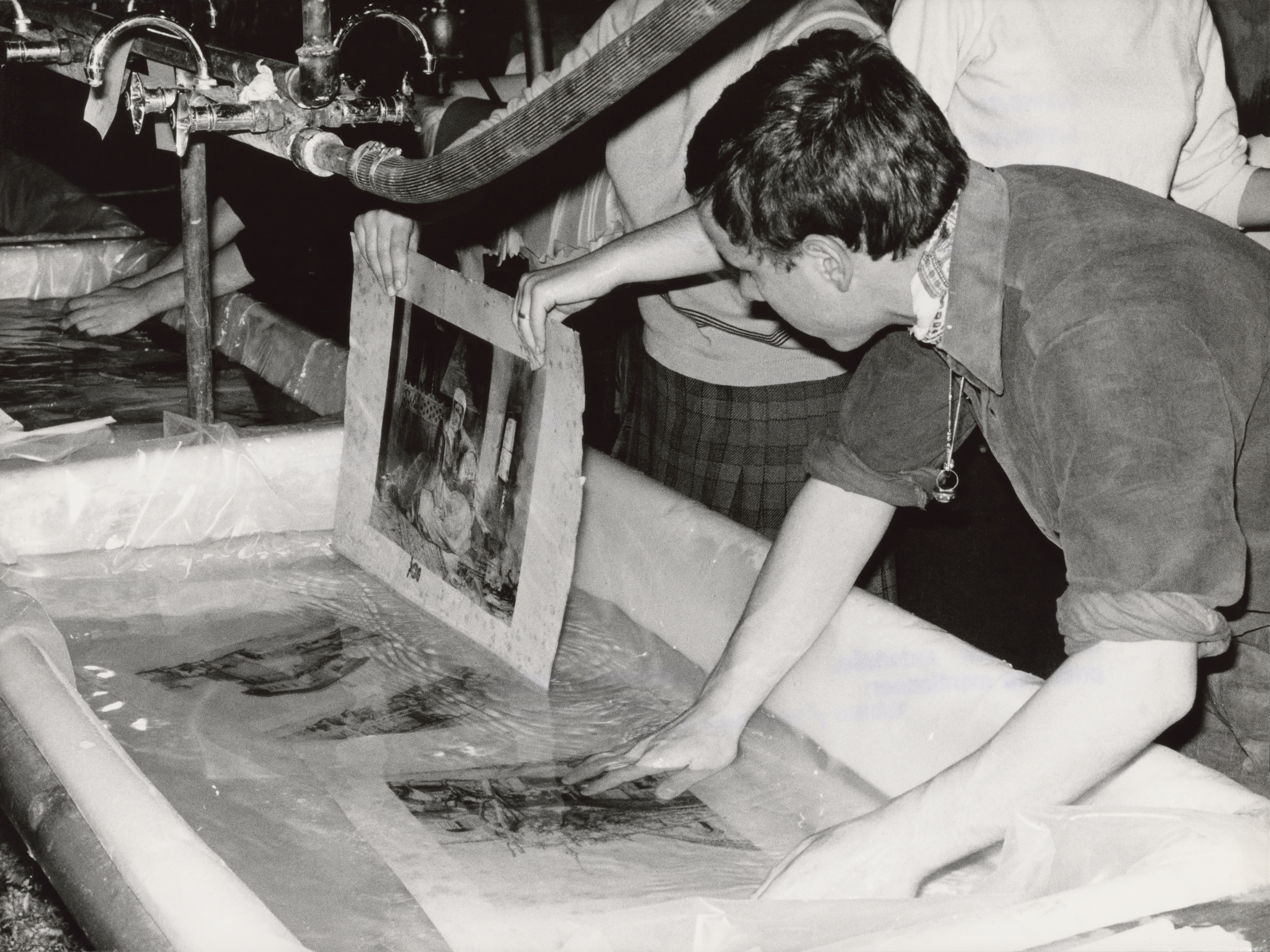
Manuscripts from the National Library being washed and dried in the boiler room of Firenze Santa Maria Novella railway station, after the flood

- Archives of the Opera del Duomo (Archivio di Opera del Duomo): 6,000 volumes of documents and 55 illuminated manuscripts were damaged.
- Gabinetto Vieusseux Library (Biblioteca del Gabinetto Vieusseux): All 250,000 volumes were damaged, including titles of romantic literature and Risorgimento history; submerged in water, they became swollen and distorted. Pages, separated from their text blocks, were found pressed upon the walls and ceiling of the building.
- National Central Library (Biblioteca Nazionale Centrale Firenze): Located alongside the Arno, the National Library was cut off from the rest of the city by the flood. 1,300,000 items (a third of their holdings) were damaged, including prints, maps, posters, newspapers and a majority of works in the Palatine and Magliabechi collections. Over 300,000 books, 30,000 newspapers, and 20,000 periodicals were submerged under water. The damaged material included 2/3 of the Fondo Magliabechiano, large volumes of the Fondo Palatino.
- The State Archives (Archivio di Stato): Roughly 40% of the collection was damaged, including property and financial records; birth, marriage and death records; judicial and administrative documents; and police records, among others. 40 rooms were flooded, and 50,000 volumes containing 40-50,000,000 documents were submerged under water and mud. Damaged material included the series of the Conventi soppressi, the Capitano del Popolo, the Capitani di Parte Guelfa and the Otto di Guardia, concerning both medieval and modern history.
- Biblioteca e Archivio del Risorgimento (Library and Archive of the Italian Unification): 7,000 volumes were inundated. The facility and collections were restored and the Library and Archive reopened in 1969.
- The Università di Firenze's Library of Faculty of Letters and Philosophy (university) had 100,000 volumes destroyed or badly damaged, and 70-80,000 were damaged at the library of the Faculty of Law. The damage was aggravated by the explosion of fuel deposits and the collapse of walls.

Others:

- Academy of Agriculturists (Accademia dei Georgofili)
- Historic Institute of the Resistance (Istituto Storico della Resistenza)
- Hospital of the Innocents (Ospedale degli Innocenti)
- Institute and Museum of the History of Science (Istituto e Museo di Storia della Scienza)
- Uffizi Gallery
- Book shops and antique book dealers, many in possession of rare materials
- Numerous private collections
- The collections of numerous churches and cathedrals

=== Works affected ===
- Crucifix by Giovanni Cimabue
- Gates of Paradise by Lorenzo Ghiberti
- Magdalene Penitent by Donatello

== Funding and assistance ==
Realizing the immense wealth and importance of Florentine culture in a global context, many individuals and organizations contributed to the conservation mission, providing both funding and manpower. Art historian and professor Carlo Ludovico Ragghianti assembled an Italian committee (Comitato Fondo Internazionale per Firenze) with Mayor Piero Bargellini as chairman to raise awareness of the needs of Florence's art and academic institutions. Members included prominent figures from around the world, representatives of their own respective institutions.

The recovery of Florence's cultural heritage involved an extensive international network of scholars, conservators, and organisations. A number of other international committees were formed with the intention of sponsoring various institutions in Florence:

- The Franco-Italian Committee aided the Church of Santa Maria Maddalena di Pazzi in Borgo Pinti.
- The U.S. Committee to Rescue Italian Art. One of the most significant was the Committee to Rescue Italian Art (CRIA), established shortly after the flood. CRIA included figures such as Bates Lowry (chairman), Sydney J. Freedberg (vice chairman), and Eve Borsook, and played a major role in fundraising and coordinating international support. Public figures including Jacqueline Kennedy Onassis also helped raise awareness and mobilise financial support in the United States. Conservators such as Carolyn Price Horton and Richard Young contributed to translating emergency salvage operations into long-term conservation practices, particularly in book and paper conservation.
- The Viennese armory was responsible for restoring the arms and armor of the Bargello Museum.
- A Dutch committee sponsored the Buonarroti House Museum.
- A group of Germans repaired the musical instruments of the Bardini Museum.
- The UK Italian Art and Archives Rescue Fund (IAARF), which became the Venice in Peril Fund in 1971, under the chairmanship of Sir Ashley Clarke, former Ambassador to Rome and chairman of the British Italian Society.

The work of and contributions made by these committees were supervised by a central committee in Rome.

=== National committees and different support mechanisms (comparative overview) ===
The flood prompted the creation of national committees in multiple countries to support heritage rescue and recovery in Florence. Scholars have described differences between national responses in terms of organisational form, public engagement, and the relative emphasis placed on fundraising, coordination, and longer-term support. In the United States, the Committee to Rescue Italian Art (CRIA) is described as a prominent, media-facing initiative that mobilised public appeals and fundraising, while in the United Kingdom the Italian Art and Archives Rescue Fund (IAARF) is documented as part of the broader relief and support efforts discussed in public and parliamentary records.

Examples of national support mechanisms (illustrative)
| Country / initiative | Organisational form | Emphasis described in sources |
|---|---|---|
| United States – Committee to Rescue Italian Art (CRIA) | National committee with area committees | Public appeals and fundraising are described as central to CRIA's mobilisation and visibility in U.S. coverage of post-disaster heritage support. |
| United Kingdom – Italian Art and Archives Rescue Fund (IAARF) | National fundraising initiative | Fundraising and institutional support for relief and recovery are documented in public discussion and UK parliamentary records. |

=== Media, public appeals, and fundraising ===
Sources on the heritage response emphasise that media circulation and public-facing fundraising were important tools for mobilising international support beyond the immediate emergency phase. Kumar (2023) identifies recurring frames used in CRIA communications and U.S. press coverage—emphasising damage, rescue and restoration, the committee's actions, and the cultural value of Florence—to encourage donations and participation. Retrospective accounts also describe how Franco Zeffirelli's film Florence: Days of Destruction circulated through fundraising networks and associated screenings, helping sustain attention and support for recovery efforts.

Several individuals are documented as playing roles in the U.S.-based Committee to Rescue Italian Art (CRIA), which formed to support heritage rescue and longer-term restoration after the flood.Later scholarship describes CRIA as a nationwide organisation with more than 200 members or affiliates, and notes that it raised approximately US$2.5 million for restoration work. Its activities included public appeals, the shipment of conservation materials, and support for expert involvement in Florence. Art historian Sydney Joseph Freedberg is recorded as serving as national vice chairman of CRIA (1966–74). Contemporary reporting also describes art historian Bates Lowry as heading the U.S. committee and organising fundraising in response to the Florence flood. In the conservation field, book and paper conservator Carolyn Price Horton is described as being involved in Florence flood recovery work and connected with CRIA-related efforts.

The flood is frequently discussed as a major catalyst for modern preservation and conservation practice, particularly in libraries and archives. Scholarship and retrospective accounts describe how large-scale damage to books, manuscripts and collections accelerated the development and wider adoption of more systematic emergency salvage and treatment approaches, and contributed to the professionalisation of conservation through more standardised workflows and training initiatives.

Additional funding came from various governments, UNESCO, and the International Committee for the Assistance of Museums, Works of Art, Libraries and Archives, among others. The city of Edinburgh (Scotland), twinned with Florence, sent practical help for the citizens in the form of double-decker buses to temporarily replace those which had been lost in the floods. When these eventually returned home, they operated with the international 'GB' registration plate still affixed to the rear; each also carried a small plaque presented by the Florentine transport authorities indicating their gratitude for the gesture made by the people of Edinburgh.

Charity auctions were also organised. In a show of support for the Florentine art community, Pablo Picasso had one of his paintings, Recumbent Woman Reading, auctioned off on an internationally televised programme. He donated the $105,000 it earned to restoration efforts in Italy. Similarly, Pietro Annigoni and Luciano Guarnieri donated the money they earned from selling 575 colour lithographs (depicting the events surrounding the flood and its aftermath), produced from 13 of their drawings.

Florentine native Franco Zeffirelli produced the short documentary Florence: Days of Destruction to raise awareness of the flood. Released a month after the disaster, it reputedly raised more than $20 million for reconstruction efforts. The film was narrated in English and Italian by actor Richard Burton.

People from Aberfan, Wales sent parcels with toys and clothes to Florence, which had belonged to the children who had died during the Aberfan disaster two weeks earlier.

While many institutions from around the world financially compensated employees who travelled to Italy and aided in the restoration of Florence, many others volunteered their services for absolutely no pay. Collectively, these people have been fondly referred to as "Mud Angels".

=== National committees and different support mechanisms (comparative overview) ===
The flood prompted the creation of national committees in multiple countries to support heritage rescue and recovery in Florence. While the article lists several initiatives, sources indicate that national responses differed in scale, public engagement strategies, and the balance between fundraising, coordination, and field-based activity. Scholarship describes the United States' response as highly visible and media-driven through the celebrity-backed Committee to Rescue Italian Art (CRIA), while the United Kingdom also organised fundraising and institutional support through the Italian Art and Archives Rescue Fund (IAARF). The Italian Art and Archvies Rescue Fund (IAARF) also focused on the floods in Venice. The charity Venice in Peril Fund succeeded IAARF and still works in protecting heritage of Venice.

Examples of national support mechanisms (illustrative)
| Country / initiative | Organisational form | Emphasis described in sources |
|---|---|---|
| United States – Committee to Rescue Italian Art (CRIA) | National committee with area committees | Media-intensive public appeals and fundraising, supported by high-profile leadership and wide public mobilisation. |
| United Kingdom – Italian Art and Archives Rescue Fund (IAARF) | National fundraising initiative | Fundraising and institutional support is documented in UK records and public discussion. |

=== Media, public appeals, and fundraising ===
Although Wikipedia notes the arrival of aid and references Franco Zeffirelli's film Florence: Days of Destruction, sources suggest that media circulation and public-facing fundraising were central tools for mobilising international support. Kumar (2023) identifies recurring frames used by CRIA and U.S. press coverage—emphasising damage, rescue and restoration, the committee's actions, and the cultural value of Florence—to encourage donations and participation. Retrospective accounts also describe how Zeffirelli's film circulated through fundraising networks and screenings associated with relief campaigns, helping sustain attention beyond the immediate disaster period.

=== The "Mud Angels" ===
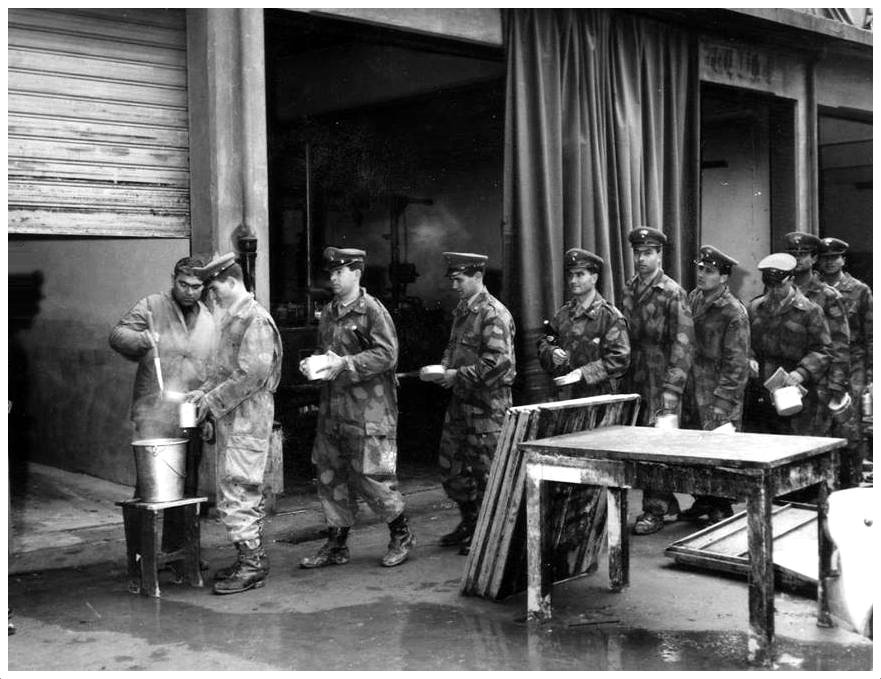
Mud angels in November 1966.

Mario Primicerio, the mayor of Florence from 1995 to 1999, helped celebrate the Mud Angels' (angeli del fango) efforts during an anniversary celebration in 1996. Thirty years earlier, he was a professor who lent his assistance in preserving the priceless artifacts of Florence. The Angels cleaned the city of refuse, mud and oil, and retrieved works of art, books and other materials from flooded rooms; experts from around the world volunteered their time and knowledge in the conservation of the aforementioned materials.

In a 1996 interview, Primicerio offered three principal reasons as to why the Mud Angels felt compelled to help: a concern for future generations, a feeling of international unity and a pervasive sense of solidarity.

What we were doing was dictated by the desire to give back the traces of the history of the past to future generations, so that it could be used for the spiritual growth of people who perhaps had yet to be born...it was the international community that worked to try to save Florence, this unique patrimony which belonged to the whole world.

— Mario Primicerio, Speciale Alluvione

=== The "Flood Ladies" ===
The Flood Ladies were a group of international female artists who contributed artworks to the city of Florence following the catastrophic 1966 flood of the Arno as a sign of solidarity and to help repair the psychological damage done by the flood. The group was formed in Florence, Italy in 1966. Contributors to the collection lived all over the world. In 2014 the organization Advancing Women Artists Foundation headed an effort to preserve, exhibit and acknowledge the contribution of these women.

Outstanding heroes

== Conservation measures ==
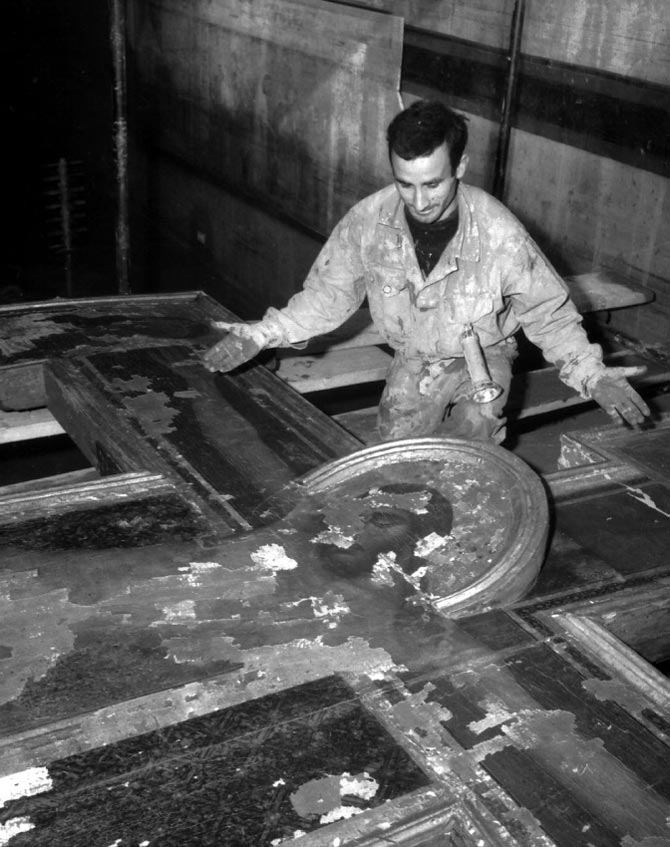
Cimabue's Crucifix after it was nearly destroyed in the 1966 Flood of the Arno, before the 10-year restoration

Many experts in the field of conservation, such as Peter Waters, utilised their knowledge in restoring the works of art and literature ravaged by the flood. Staff from the Central Institute of Restoration and Institute of Book Pathology, for example, volunteered their time, efforts, and expertise in this enormous undertaking. New concepts, such as "phased conservation", and methods in conservation, such as mass deacidification, were conceived during this period after the flood ravaged the city of Florence. The conservation scientist Joyce Plesters established a laboratory in Florence for the microchemical study of paintings.

=== Books and records ===
Priorities were established during the process of conserving damaged books and records, the most critical of which became the retrieval of materials from flooded rooms. After they were rescued, books and records were typically washed and disinfected. In certain cases, bindings were cut and sheets treated individually. Following a thorough cleansing, the materials were then dried in Florentine libraries, space permitting, or at locations outside of the city, such as tobacco kilns and granaries. In some circumstances, large numbers of books were covered with sawdust, as a means of drawing out moisture. When not washed prior to drying, dried mud was then scraped off the exterior of the books.

One or both of two drying techniques was applied: interleaving by hand and/or drying with the aid of domestic heaters or other mechanical equipment. Interleaving involved the placement of blotting papers within the text-block of a book and replacing them once they were fully soaked; a variety of papers were used, including mimeograph paper and green blotting paper (the latter of which ultimately caused more damage). In kilns, the humidity level was slowly lowered from ninety to forty percent. If deemed necessary, bindings were removed and dried separately. Removed pages were hung out to dry on an apparatus similar to a clothes line.

Fearing the spread of mold, workers completed these tasks with the greatest speed possible. After they were disinfected and dried, the items were then reassembled, restored and, if necessary, rebound. Card catalogs and in some cases, the actual books and documents were reproduced by reprinting on early presses, photocopying, or copying by hand.

==== The National Library Centers of Florence: a case study ====
Initially the transportation of large numbers of books to other institutes (to repair and rebind) was considered, but decided against on logistical grounds. British book conservator Anthony Cains was appointed Technical Director of Conservation for the library in 1967 and remained for six years, supervising recovery efforts. Within six months of the flood, the National Library of Florence had 144 workers on hand: three binders, eight binder trainees, two librarians, forty-two workmen, eighty-one student volunteers and eight other library staff members.

Together they devised a logical and efficient method of book repair, involving nine separate and clearly defined steps:

- Books were selected for treatment. The details of work to be done were recorded on a formatted card that accompanied its respective book throughout its treatment. Once work was completed, the card was permanently filed. A universal language utilising symbols, created with foreign workers in mind, was employed in the formatting of this card. Symbols were assigned to key phrases that communicated the condition of each book and how its repair was to be conducted, such as:
  - historically important – only to be dealt with by experts
  - incomplete
  - medium mud
  - rebind
  - collation part missing
- The book was photographed.
- The book's collation was verified and its covers removed and stored in a marked case (if they were to be used in a new binding).
- If necessary, the book was carefully taken apart to wash it in warm water and disinfect it with Topane (pentachlorophenol).
- In certain cases, the leaves of the book were deacidified and buffered.
- The text-block was pressed.
- The text-block was dried in specially designed cabinets.
- Sections of the book were then reconstructed and the text-blocks collated.
- Finally, each book was wrapped in a paper sheet that had been impregnated with an antimicrobial substance, then they were set aside for any later repair or rebinding. The binding was completed in the main reading room of the library, which had been converted (temporarily) for this purpose.

This methodical nine-part system enabled workers to process between seventy and a hundred books a day.

After the Florence flood, the Biblioteca Nazionale Centrale was not allowed to put books back into the lower levels.

The disaster also accelerated the adoption of techniques such as heat-set tissue repair, polyester encapsulation, and mass deacidification, which later became standard practices in research libraries.

=== Paintings ===
Many panel paintings were critically damaged as a result of water saturating their wood, causing the glue and gesso, which compose the priming layer, to dissolve. Consequently, the paintings' colours dissolved as well. In addition, the moisture caused paintings to buckle and crack or develop blisters, and the paint to chip and fall. Actions were taken to stabilize the problem by applying mulberry paper to the affected paintings and storing them in cool, stable environments where humidity was slowly decreased. In extreme cases, the paint layer was extracted from the wood and gesso and then reapplied to a new support. Nystatin, an antifungal, was sprayed on the wood to prevent mold from growing. Treatment facilities were established at locations such as the Boboli Garden Lemon-House, where over two hundred of these panel paintings were restored.

Similar measures were necessary to conserve canvas paintings. First, an original canvas was relined and gauze applied to the painted surface, which was then ironed. This process is referred to as the rintelatura, or "new canvas" method. Relatively minor surface work was often completed with a variety of solvents and/or types of resin.

=== Frescoes ===
Frescoes demanded more complicated treatment. Normally water, once it evaporates, will leave a layer of residual salt on the surface of the wall that absorbed it. In some instances, the resultant efflorescence obscured painted images. In other cases, the impermeability of the fresco plaster caused the salt to become trapped beneath the surface, causing bubbles to form and erupt, and the paint to fall. The adhesion of the plaster to the wall was often also seriously compromised. A fresco could only be detached when fully dry. To dry a fresco, workers cut narrow tunnels beneath it, in which heaters were placed to draw out moisture from below (instead of outwards, which would have further damaged the paintings). Within a few days, the fresco was ready to be detached.

Fuel oil, which coated many painted works of art, was removed by using Japanese tissue paper to apply a solvent, which dissolved the tar. An absorbent, such as talcum powder, was then distributed on the tissue paper.

=== Sculpture and other objects ===
It became imperative to clean sculpture immediately, before it fully absorbed the oil. Flaking sculpture was sprayed with a silicate mixture, while wooden pieces were treated with insecticides and toxic gases to kill insects and prevent future infestation. Weaponry, like firearms and swords, were taken apart, cleaned with paraffin, and finally lubricated to prevent future rusting.

Bronze objects were kept in dehumidification chambers for a few weeks and cleaned with distilled water or polished. For more severely damaged pieces, experts completed "depth cleaning", which entailed the use of small drills and vacuuming. Similar measures were taken with gold. Broken objects were reassembled using photographs and other retrieved documentation.

=== Effect on preservation and conservation awareness ===
The disastrous results of the flood established an international awareness of the need for preservation and conservation education and facilities. It is no coincidence that the National Historic Preservation Act was passed in the United States in 1966. Carolyn Price Horton was one of the "Mud Angels" sent to Florence by the Committee to Rescue Italian Art (CRIA). The American Library Association published Horton's Cleaning and Preserving Bindings and Related Materials in 1967, and republished it in 1969. During the next twenty years:

2,000 to 3,000 preservation organizations actively engaged in public education, advocacy, preservation and restoration projects of various kinds, many of them operating revolving funds. In terms of geographic interest, distinctions among the regions are no longer drawn. Membership in the National Trust for Historic Preservation grew from 10,700 in 1966 to 185,000 in 1986. More than 35 university graduate professional and technical courses directly related to historic preservation were created in the interim. It would be reasonable to estimate that more than 54,000 jobs were created in the administrative aspect of preservation alone.

— Robert E. Stipe and Antoinette J. Lee

=== Comparative perspectives: Florence and Venice ===
The floods of November 1966 affected both Florence and Venice, but the nature of damage and conservation responses differed. In Florence, the Arno River caused extensive damage to movable cultural heritage, including books, manuscripts, and artworks. Recovery efforts focused on emergency salvage and the development of large-scale conservation techniques, particularly in libraries such as the Biblioteca Nazionale Centrale di Firenze.

In Venice, flooding associated with acqua alta primarily affected buildings and urban infrastructure. Conservation efforts have therefore focused more on long-term environmental management, including responses to saltwater damage and ongoing flood risk.

Scholars note that Florence relied heavily on international volunteers and public fundraising, including initiatives such as the Committee to Rescue Italian Art (CRIA), while Venice's response has been more closely tied to sustained governmental and infrastructural strategies. Comparative studies suggest that Florence represents a model of post-disaster recovery, whereas Venice illustrates long-term heritage risk management.

=== Work outstanding ===
A significant amount of restorative work remains to be done in Florence. Due to a lack of awareness, funding, and manpower, a great number of works of art and books lie in storage, dirty and damaged. Christopher Clarkson, noted conservator, called attention to this problem in a 2007 letter, stating that the National Library still has a "warehouse" full of books to be repaired and bound; many others need cleaning or reassembling. According to a 1993 report, approximately 25% of the 80,000 items belonging to the Magliabecchi and Palatino collections had not been fully restored in the nearly thirty years since the flood. The number of conservators that work at the library presently is only about a tenth of the amount that worked there immediately after the flood.

== Legacy ==
The 1966 Florence flood had a lasting impact on the development of modern preservation practices in libraries, archives, and museums. It encouraged a shift from individual object restoration toward collection-wide management, prioritisation, and preventive conservation.

The large-scale recovery effort contributed to the adoption of systematic workflows and approaches such as phased conservation, later applied in major institutions including the Library of Congress.

The flood also highlighted the importance of disaster preparedness and international cooperation, and is widely regarded as a formative event in the development of modern conservation policy and practice.

== Environmental measures ==
Regional officials in Tuscany are responsible for organizing a massive project, the purpose of which is to not only protect the area from future flooding but to maintain high water quality and effectively utilize water resources.

Work commenced in 1984, with the construction of the Bilancino Dam, near Florence. The Sieve tributary and spillway at Pontedera are among other developments. The national government has funded a majority of these various subprojects, with the city of Florence being the primary recipient of the money.

== See also ==
- 1966 Venice flood
- Architectural conservation
- Byron Gallery; New York based art gallery that hosted a benefit for flood victims in 1967.
- Conservation and restoration of cultural heritage
- Historic preservation
- History of Florence
- History of Italy
- Natural disaster
- Preservation (library and archival science)

== Bibliography ==
=== General references ===
1. Taylor, Kathrine Kressman (1969). Diary of Florence in Flood. New York: Simon and Schuster.
