= Carla Thorneycroft, Lady Thorneycroft =

British philanthropist

Carla Thorneycroft, Baroness Thorneycroft DBE (12 February 1914 – 7 March 2007) was the wife of Conservative Party politician and Chancellor of the Exchequer Peter Thorneycroft. Lady Thorneycroft helped establish the Venice in Peril Fund and was a noted philanthropist and patroness of the arts.

== Early life ==
Carla Maria Concetta Francesca Malagola, Contessa Cappi was the elder daughter of the Italian Count Guido Malagola Cappi and his wife, Alexandra (née Dunbar-Marshall) who had come over with her mother from Natchez, Mississippi to settle in Europe. She was born in Paris, and grew up in Venice, where her paternal grandfather Professor Carlo Malagola of Bologna kept the archives at the Frari basilica, and then in Rome.

Her father was an interior designer and a talented photographer. Alexandra and Guido lived in Venice and Rome and Carla was educated by Roman Catholic nuns, along with her siblings, Anna-Viola and Francesco. Francesco, later known as Francis Dunbar Marshall Malagola (1918–2001), was an artist whose works are conserved in a wide range of European collections and museums.

In 1930, Carla and her mother met Major Mervyn Thorneycroft while on holiday on Capri, and later visited his home, Dunston Hall in Staffordshire, where she first met her future second husband, the Major's son, Peter Thorneycroft, newly commissioned in the Royal Artillery. They were quickly engaged, but the engagement was broken off after she returned to Rome. She married Count Giorgio Roberti, in 1934, aged 20, and had a son and a daughter.

During the Second World War, she served as a nurse with the Red Cross at the Principessa Piemonte hospital in Rome.

== Life in England ==
Her marriage was annulled in 1946, and she then took her young children to England. She impressed the Vogue fashion editors with her startling new ideas which they commissioned from her and her forthright attitude won her praise at Vogue. She worked with John Deakin, Cecil Beaton and Norman Parkinson. Her interior design skills and instinctive eye were spotted and she assisted John Fowler and Sybil Colefax to renovate Chevening and worked with Nancy Lancaster.

She met Peter Thorneycroft again at a party hosted by Henry "Chips" Channon. Thorneycroft had become a barrister and been elected as a Conservative MP in 1938. He had been married and divorced. They married in 1949, and she left Vogue in 1951.

She was a founder member of the Italian Art and Archives Rescue Fund, which was formed in April 1966 after catastrophic floods in Florence threatened its historic works of art. She was a member of the Fund's first committee, alongside Sir Ashley Clarke (former British ambassador in Italy), John Julius Norwich and Mrs. Natalie Brooke (wife of the secretary of the Royal Academy). Venice was flooded in 1966, and the fund became the Venice in Peril Fund in 1971. She became a member of the Italian Order of Merit in 1967.

Meanwhile, her husband held a succession of ministerial positions. He was President of the Board of Trade from 1951–57, Chancellor of the Exchequer from 1957 to 1958, Minister of Aviation from 1960–62, Minister of Defence and then Secretary of State for Defence from 1962–64. He left the House of Commons in 1966, and became a life peer in 1967. He was Chairman of the Conservative Party from 1975–81.

She supported his political career, and spoke on his behalf in his re-election campaigns. She was a trustee of the Conservative Winter Ball and its president from 1984 to 1994. She also supported him with his later career in business, on the boards of Trusthouse Forte, Pirelli and Cinzano. Her husband died in 1994. She was appointed Dame Commander of the Order of the British Empire in 1995, for her work for the Conservative Party.

She was also a founder of the League of Friends of the Italian Hospital in London from 1956 until it closed in 1989, a vice-president of the British-Italian Society for 50 years, a trustee of the Rosehill Arts Theatre, a trustee of the Chichester Festival Theatre Trust from 1962 to 1988, and a vice-president of the Council of Friends of Westminster Cathedral from 1993. She was a trustee of the Royal School of Needlework for 8 years, from 1964–76.

== Family ==
Her husband, Giorgio, and her son, Piero, Count Roberti, from her first marriage predeceased her as did her second husband, Peter Thorneycroft. She was survived by a daughter, Francesca, from her first marriage, a daughter from her second marriage, Victoria, and a stepson, John Thorneycroft.
