= Venice in Peril Fund =

British charity

- Formation: 1971; 55 years ago
- Founder: Sir Ashley Clarke
- Type: NGO
- Legal status: Charity
- Purpose: Art and architecture conservation
- Region served: Venice
- Chairman: Guy Elliott
- Website: Official website
- Formerly called: Art & Archives Rescue Fund (AARF)

Venice in Peril Fund CIO is a British registered charity. It raises funds to restore and conserve the art and architecture of Venice, and to investigate ways to protect them against future risks, particularly rising sea levels. Although it focuses on the conservation of specific sites, Venice in Peril maintains its concern for the wider environmental issues affecting the city and the lagoon. In support of its conservation work, Venice in Peril Fund also promotes a deeper understanding of Venice, its history, the contribution it has made to world culture and its modern challenges, so as to encourage responsible and informed engagement with the city. As part of this educational mission, it organises regular lecture series in the UK and occasional visits to Venice itself. It also provides annual bursaries for students of conservation at City & Guilds of London Art School. Venice in Peril Fund is a member of the Association of International Private Committees for the Safeguarding of Venice.

== History ==
=== Art & Archives Rescue Fund (1967–1971) ===
The predecessor to the Venice in Peril Fund was the Italian Art & Archives Rescue Fund (IAARF), which was created as the British response to the 1966 Venice flood. Sir Ashley Clarke, former British Ambassador to Rome and at that time chairman of the British Italian Society, was asked to chair a committee to raise funds to help rescue artworks, archives and buildings in Venice and Florence, which had also flooded. Besides Clarke, the committee consisted of A. W. Tuke (Honorary Treasurer), Carla Thorneycroft (Appeal Chairman), T. S. R. Boase, Sir Maurice Bowra, Hugh Noel Blakiston, Anthony Blunt, Lord Bridges, Sir Kenneth Clark, the Earl of Crawford and Balcarres, the Earl of Drogheda, Sir Frank Francis, the Earl of Harewood, Sir Philip Hendy, Henry Moore, John Pope-Hennessy, Lionel Robbins, Nicolai Rubinstein, Sir Evelyn Shuckburgh, Ellis Waterhouse, Sir Charles Wheeler, and Professor J. H. Whitfield. The IAARF continued its conservation work until it was reconstituted as the Venice in Peril Fund in 1971. The papers of the IAARF were deposited at the Public Record Office, now the National Archives.

=== Venice in Peril Fund ===
In 1971, UNESCO appealed to its member states to collaborate in helping to save the entirety of Venice. In response, Clarke re-founded the AARF as the Venice in Peril Fund. He set up a board of trustees whose stated objective was to help save and maintain the world-famous artistic and architectural treasures of Venice. John Julius, Viscount Norwich, joined as Chairman the same year, with Clarke serving as the Vice Chair.

Under the chairmanship of John Julius Norwich, who was supported by the efforts of trustees such as Clarke, Carla Thorneycroft, Sir John Pope-Hennessy and Nathalie Brooke, Venice in Peril became a leading force in the city's conservation. Venice in Peril established itself at the forefront of the Venice conservation movement.

To boost the funding efforts in 1977, Peter Boizot, the founder of Pizza Express, created the Pizza Veneziana. Until 2019 a percentage of the sale price of every Pizza Veneziana sold was donated to Venice in Peril. £2 million was donated between 1977 and 2015.

=== 21st century ===
In 2003 Venice in Peril Fund organised a ‘state of knowledge’ conference on the lagoon of Venice, with the collaboration of Churchill College, Cambridge and Corila. The aim of the project was to gather together the work of scholars and experts in a cross-disciplinary effort to exchange knowledge and assess the challenges facing Venice and its lagoon. This resulted in two books, both commissioned by Venice in Peril. A scholarly and technical volume, Flooding and Environmental Challenges for Venice and its Lagoons: State of Knowledge, was published in 2005 by Cambridge University Press, and a more accessible book, The Science of Saving Venice, was published in 2004. In 2009, another book commissioned by Venice in Peril was published: The Venice Report, Demography, Tourism, Financing and Change of Use of Buildings.

In 2011, during the Venice Biennale, Venice in Peril mounted an exhibition of photographs of Venice by prominent photographers, including Candida Höfer, to raise awareness and funds. It was entitled Real Venice and received critical acclaim.

=== 2019 Flood ===
In November 2019, Venice suffered its worst flooding since the foundation of the fund in 1966. A 2020 Venice in Peril appeal funded conservation efforts to restore and protect several public buildings that had been particularly badly affected by the flood.

By Venice in Peril's 50th anniversary in 2021, the Fund had completed over 75 conservation and restoration projects in Venice. The work continues, with recent major projects including the conservation of Canova's memorial in the Frari church and the Iconostasis in Torcello Cathedral in memory of John Julius Norwich. Venice in Peril's representatives continue to draw attention to the evolving challenges facing the city.

Guy Elliott took up the post of Chair in April 2022 and Anthony Roberts became Vice Chair.

== Major projects ==
- 2022: Monument to Canova in the Basilica di Santa Maria Gloriosa dei Frari
- 2021: Trinity Wellhead in Archivio di Stato di Venezia, formerly part of the Frari, with sculpture by Cabianca (50th Anniversary Appeal)
- 2020: Flood Appeals for San Nicolò dei Mendicoli, St George's Church, and the Gallerie dell'Accademia (the Tablino and the Palladio Staircase)
- 2019: Iconostasis in Torcello Cathedral (in memory of John Julius Norwich, and in collaboration with Save Venice Inc.)
- 2013: Plaster casts of two lions by Canova, in the Gallerie dell'Accademia
- 2013: Capella Zen and three stone reliefs within Basilica San Marco
- 1999–2005: Cappella Emiliani
- 1996: Conversion of a vernacular house for public housing in San Giobbe
- 1995–96: Sculpture of a merchant, 'The Fourth Moro', on the façade of the house of Tintoretto (in memory of Sir Ashley Clarke)
- 1977–85: Mosaics in Torcello Cathedral (with 10 other committees)
- 1976–79: Porta della Carta, the entrance to the Palazzo Ducale
- 1972–80: Restoration of structure and art works in the Church of San Niccolò dei Mendicoli
- 1972–74: Loggetta of San Marco's Campanile
- 1969–70: Structural restoration of the Church of Madonna dell'Orto

== List of Chairs ==
- 1967-1971: Sir Ashley Clarke
- 1971-1999: John Julius Norwich (Viscount Norwich)
- 1999-2012: the Hon. Anna Somers Cocks OBE
- 2013-2022: Jonathan Keates FRSL
- 2022–present: Guy Elliott

== See also ==
- Save Venice Inc.
