= Biblioteca e Archivio del Risorgimento =

Public library and archive in Florence, Italy, relating to the Italian unification

Biblioteca e Archivio del Risorgimento (Library and Archive of the Risorgimento)
- 43.772909°N 11.259918°E
- Location: Postal and physical address: Via Sant'Egidio 21 50122 Florence, Italy
- Type: Public
- Established: August 1945
- Service area: Italy (Tuscany, Florence)

Collection
- Size: 30,000 item (2019), 21,000 item (2020), 27,000 item (2021), 29,700 item (2022), 3,000 item (2019), 3,000 item (2022)

Other information
- Affiliation: Municipality of Florence Società Toscana per la Storia del Risorgimento (Tuscan Society for the History of the Risorgimento) www.toscanarisorgimento.it –––––––––––––––––––– ISIL IT-FI0106 ––––––––––––––––––––
- Website: wwwext.comune.fi.it/comune/biblioteche/risorgi.htm

Biblioteca e Archivio del Risorgimento (lit. 'Library and Archive of the Risorgimento') is a library and archive located in the Historic Centre of Florence, Italy. It houses regional collections relating to the Italian unification and the mid-18th century.

== History ==
The Library and Archive, owned and operated by the city of Florence, was founded in August 1945 as a restoration and replacement of the Museo del Risorgimento di Firenze founded in 1901. As of 2020, the Library and Archive's holdings include about 30,000 volumes of heritage documents, 550 volumes of periodicals, two 16th-century books, ten current periodicals, one hundred discontinued periodicals, bibliographical funds, manuscripts, and a large iconographic collection from the Risorgimento period.

Collections were seriously damaged by the 1966 flood of the Arno. Nonetheless, the facility and collections were restored and the Library and Archive reopened in 1969.

The Library and Archive is in the same building as: the Biblioteca comunale centrale di Firenze (Central Municipal Library of Florence), the Accademia toscana di scienze e lettere La Colombaria (the Tuscan Academy of Sciences and Letters, "La Colombaria") and the Museo e istituto fiorentino di preistoria (the Florentine Museum and Institute of Prehistory).

In 2007, Italian Senator Paolo Amato introduced a Bill to restore of the Museum of the Risorgimento in Florence, partly in commemoration the 150^{th} anniversary of the unification of Italy (2011). The Bill states that the museum had been open to the public only nineteen years, from 1909 though 1938, and was dismantled in 1945, after World War II.

== Selected collections ==
- Fenzi archives

== See also ==
- 1966 flood of the Arno
