= 1966 Venice flood =

Natural disaster in Venice, Italy

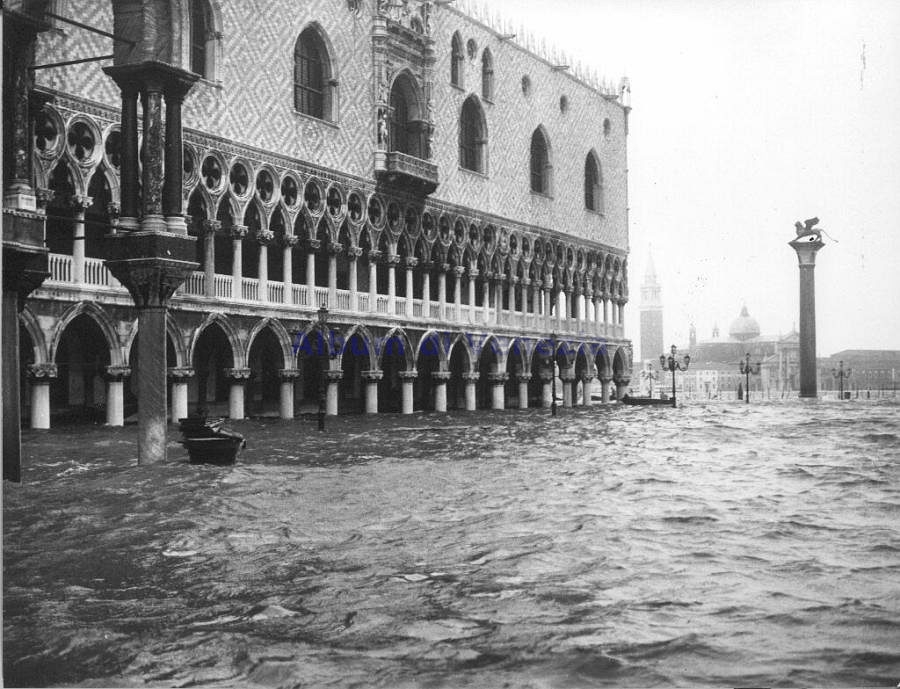
- Doge's Palace during the 1966 flood
- Date: 4 November 1966
- Location: Venice, Italy

The 1966 Venice flood (Italian: Alluvione di Venezia del 1966) was an unprecedented high water, known in Venice as an "acqua alta", with waters reaching up to 194 cm.

== Overview ==
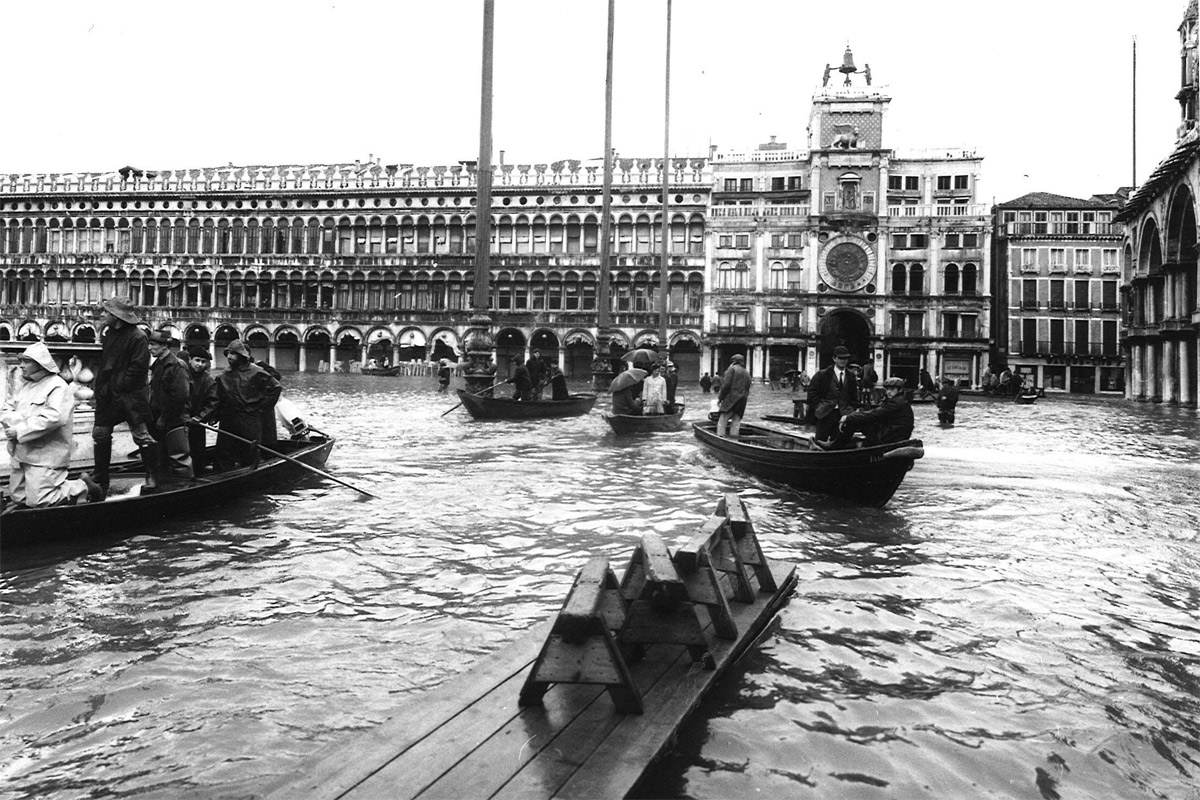
St. Mark's Square during the flood

On 4 November 1966, an abnormal occurrence of high tides, rain-swollen rivers and a severe sirocco wind caused the canals to rise to a height of 194 cm or 6 ft 4 in.

Although Venice is known for its acque alte or high waters which often flood the streets, this flood left thousands of residents without homes and caused over six million dollars' worth of damage to the various works of art throughout Venice. It was, up until 2022, the worst flood in the history of the city.

After being neglected and quietly deteriorating ever since the defeat of the Venetian Republic by Napoleon about a century and a half prior, Venice was suddenly recognized as a city in urgent need of restoration.

== Timeline of events ==
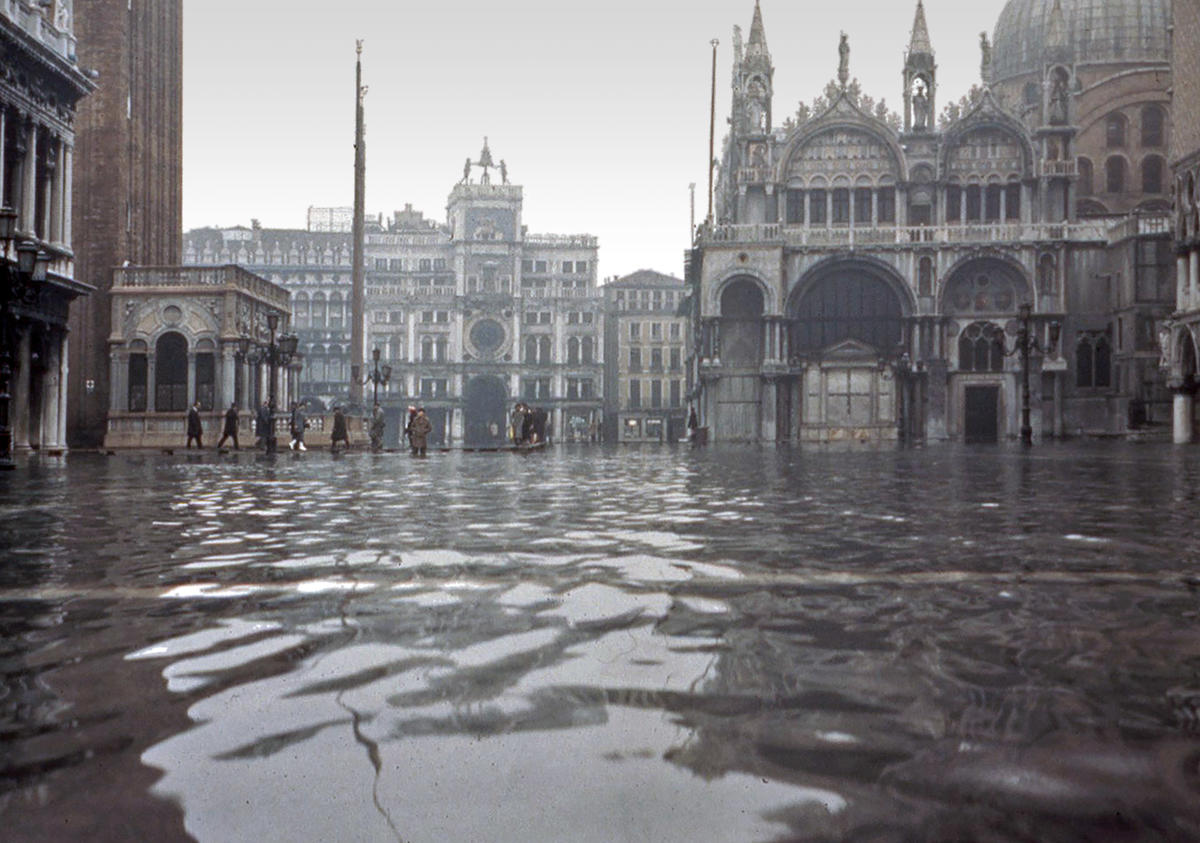
The Basilica

The Doge's Palace in St. Mark's Square was covered with 150 centimeters of sea water (194 centimeters when measured from the average sea level). Three days of heavy rain continued to deteriorate the city and left residents walking in water up to their shoulders. Other Italian cities in Northern and Central Italy, such as Florence, Trento, and Siena, were all affected by the weather. The city remained isolated for 24 hours, and having been unprepared for this type of emergency, more than 75 percent of businesses, shops, and artisans' studios, along with thousands of goods, were either seriously damaged or destroyed completely.

== Funding and Assistance ==
Funding and assistance came from all across the globe as the tragic event reminded many of the need to preserve Venetian art and architecture. Funding was received from:

- United Nations Educational, Scientific and Cultural Organization (UNESCO)
- The Private Committees for the Safeguarding of Venice (ACP)

Other organizations initiated efforts to help Venice such as:

- Save Venice Inc.
- Venice in Peril Fund
- World Monuments Fund

== Conservation and environmental measures ==
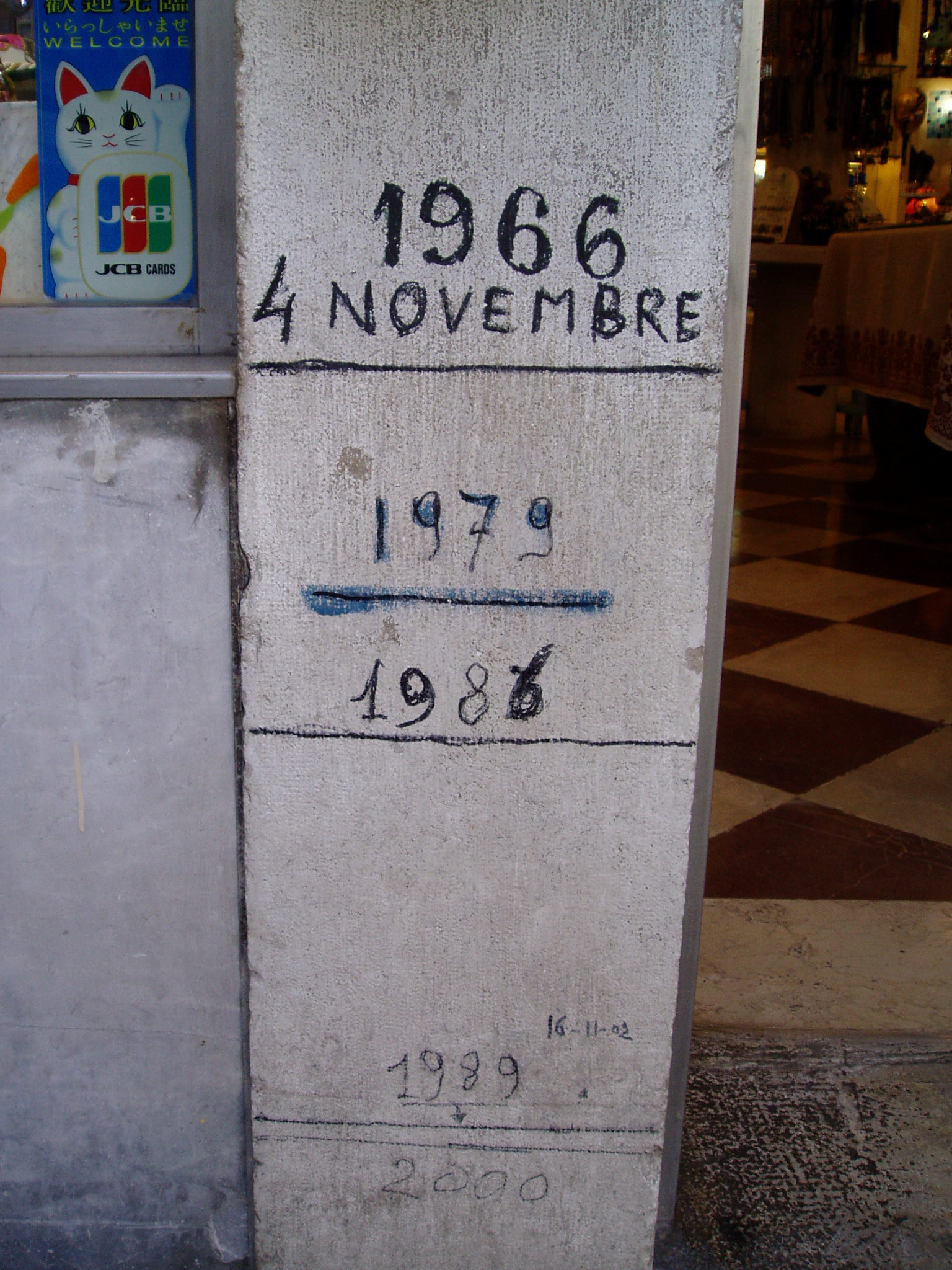
Signs of Acqua alta, including the 1966 flood

While at first the Arno River's Florentine destruction seemed more severe, it was Venice that proved to be more difficult to conserve. John Pope-Hennessy, a British art historian, detected that the first time the full extent of the city's problems was seen:

"It was not just a matter of the flood; rather it was a matter of what the flood revealed, of the havoc wrought by generations of neglect. For centuries Venice lived off tourists, and almost none of the money they brought into the city was put back into the maintenance of its monuments. And that had been aggravated by problems of pollution, an issue of the utmost gravity."

In response, several national and international organizations began working tirelessly in both Venice and Florence, making remarkable development in conserving countless individual sites. The most notable of these organizations included Save Venice Inc., UNESCO, Venice in Peril Fund, and the World Monuments Fund. In the early sixteenth century Venice's perilous physical situation was realized, when its doges tried to safeguard the lagoon city and its harbor by diverting rivers from the lagoon to prevent river silt from accumulating and blocking the lagoon. Despite these efforts, over the centuries as the mean sea level gradually rose and the foundations of many buildings settled further into the mudflats, the Venetians also gradually raised their islands, as verified by the deepest archaeological layer in St. Mark's Square, which is located approximately 10 feet below the present pavement. Thus, today's continuing flooding problem is worsened by an obsolete, 400-year old lagoon-dredging program and a sinking seabed. In combination with measures such as coastal reinforcement, the raising of quaysides, and paving and improvement of the lagoon environment, engineers at Fiat designed the MOSE Project. These gates are able to protect the city of Venice from extreme events such as floods and morphological degradation.

== See also ==
- 1966 flood of the Arno
