= Jonathan Keates =

English writer, biographer, novelist and former chairman of the Venice in Peril Fund

3rd Chairman of the Venice in Peril Fund
- In office January 2013 – April 2022
- Preceded by: John Julius Norwich
- Succeeded by: Guy Elliott

Personal details
- Born: Jonathan B. Keates; 1946 (age 79–80) Paris, France
- Education: Magdalen College, Oxford
- Occupation: Writer; Teacher

Jonathan B. Keates FRSL (born 1946) is an English writer, biographer, novelist and former chairman of the Venice in Peril Fund.

== Biography ==
Jonathan Keates was born in Paris, France, in 1946. He was educated at Bryanston School and went on to read for his undergraduate degree at Magdalen College, Oxford. He has written a number of acclaimed biographies and travel books, but his works of fiction have also received critical acclaim, most notably Allegro Postillions, for which he was awarded both the James Tait Black Memorial Prize and the Hawthornden Prize. He is a Fellow of the Royal Society of Literature.

In addition, Keates was an English teacher employed by the City of London School from 1974 to 2013, where Daniel Radcliffe was among one of his students. He was a judge of several writing competitions (including the Booker Prize 1991). Keates retired in order to focus on his chairmanship of the Venice in Peril Fund. His latest book, La Serenissima: The Story of Venice (2022), takes place in 1846 during the Habsburgs' siege of Venice.

== Awards and distinctions ==
- 1983: James Tait Black Memorial Prize for Allegro Postillions
- 1983: Hawthornden Prize for Allegro Postillions
- 1992: Fellow of the Royal Society of Literature

== Published work ==
- Shakespeare Country (1979)
- Historic London (1979)
- Canterbury Cathedral (1980)
- Love of Italy (1980)
- Allegro Postillions (1983)
- The Companion Guide to the Shakespeare Country (1983)
- Drawings and Sketches of Oxford (1983)
- Handel: The Man And His Music (1985)
- The Strangers' Gallery (1987)
- Tuscany (1988)
- Italian Journeys (1991)
- Umbria (1991)
- Stendhal (1994)
- Venice (1994)
- Purcell: A Biography (1995)
- Soon to Be a Major Motion Picture (1997)
- Smile Please (2001)
- Short Stories (2001)
- The Rough Guide History of Italy (2003)
- The Siege of Venice (2005)
- William III & Mary II Partners in Revolution (2015)
- Messiah (2016)
- Keates, Jonathan (2022). La Serenissima: The Story of Venice. Apollo.
