= Ashley Clarke =

British diplomat (1903–1994)

Sir Henry Ashley Clarke GCMG GCVO FSA

British Ambassador to Italy
- In office 1953–1962
- Preceded by: Sir Victor Mallet
- Succeeded by: Sir John Ward

Personal details
- Born: 26 June 1903 Stourbridge, Worcestershire, England
- Died: 20 January 1994 (aged 90)
- Spouse(s): Virginia Bell (m. 1937; div. 1960) Frances Molyneux (after 1962)
- Parent(s): Henry Hugh Rose Clarke; Rachel Hill Duncan
- Education: Repton School
- Alma mater: Pembroke College, Cambridge

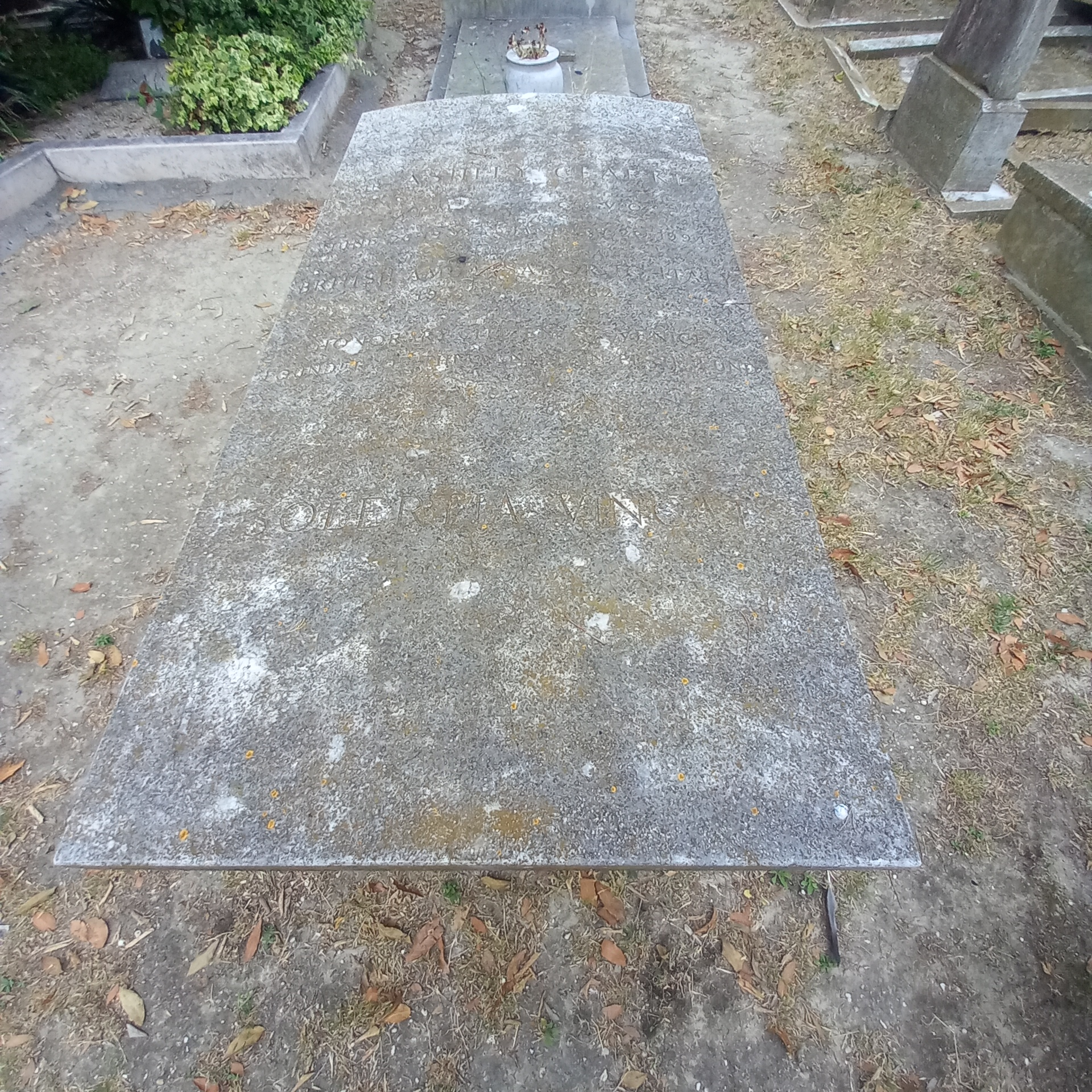
The tomb of Ashley Clarke at San Michele Cemetery, Venice

Sir Henry Ashley Clarke GCMG GCVO FSA (26 June 1903 – 20 January 1994) was a British diplomat who was ambassador to Italy. Later he was chairman of the Venice in Peril Fund.

== Early life ==
Henry Ashley Clarke was a son of Henry Hugh Rose Clarke (a son of Col. Henry Stephenson Clarke) and the former Rachel Hill Duncan (a daughter of John H. H. Duncan). He was educated at Repton School and Pembroke College, Cambridge.

== Career ==
Clarke joined the Diplomatic Service in 1925. He served at Budapest, Warsaw, Constantinople, Geneva (for the General Disarmament Conference) and Tokyo. He was Minister at Lisbon 1944–46 and at Paris 1946–49 under the ambassadors Duff Cooper and Sir Oliver Harvey.

From 1949 to 1953 he served at the Foreign Office as assistant Under-Secretary, then deputy Under-Secretary. He was officially present at the funeral of King George VI at Windsor in February 1952. In 1953, he received his last appointment as Ambassador to Italy where he remained for nine years, an unusually long period.

=== Later career ===
Clarke retired from the Diplomatic Service in 1962 and devoted himself to numerous cultural and artistic activities. He was chairman of the British–Italian Society and of the Royal Academy of Dancing, a governor of the BBC and of the British Institute of Recorded Sound (now the British Library Sound Archive), and served many other organisations. In 1967, however, he dedicated himself to Venice after the serious flooding in November 1966. He and others founded the Italian Art and Archives Rescue Fund which in 1971 became the Venice in Peril Fund of which Clarke was vice-chairman 1970–83 and president 1983–94. He was also an early member of the General Committee of Save Venice Inc., a sister organization of the Venice in Peril Fund, and the secretary-general of Europa Nostra 1969–70.

=== Honours ===
Clarke was appointed a Companion of the Order of Saint Michael and Saint George (CMG) in the 1946 New Year Honours, promoted to Knight Commander of the Order (KCMG) in the 1952 Birthday Honours and further promoted to Knight Grand Cross of the Order (GCMG) in the 1962 New Year Honours. He was given the additional knighthood of Knight Grand Cross of the Royal Victorian Order (GCVO) in 1961 on the occasion of the Queen's state visit to Italy. He was awarded the Pietro Torta Prize by the Ateneo Veneto for service to conservation in Venice. He was Knight Grand Cross of the Order of Merit of the Italian Republic, Knight Grand Cross of the Order of St Gregory the Great, cavaliere di San Marco (Knight of St Mark) and freeman of the city of Venice.

== Personal life ==
Clarke was twice married. His first marriage was to an American, Virginia Bell, in 1937. Her father was an American diplomat and her maternal grandfather was the British Brigadier General Sir Herbert Conyers Surtees. Her older sister Evangeline, was married to David K. E. Bruce, the U.S. Ambassador to France, the Federal Republic of Germany, and the United Kingdom. Virginia and Clarke divorced in 1960.

In 1962 he married Frances Molyneux, daughter of John Molyneux of Stourbridge, Worcestershire, Clarke's birthplace. There were no children of either marriage. Lady Clarke was co-founder, vice-chairman, and later co-president, of the Venice in Peril Fund. She was awarded the OBE in 1984 and raised to CBE in the Queen's Birthday Honours of 2000 – she was invested with the latter award in Rome during the Queen's state visit to Italy in October 2000. She too received the freedom of the city of Venice, in 1996.

Clarke died on 20 January 1994. His ashes were taken to Venice and on 26 February were ceremonially carried in a sixteen-oar boat, through thick fog, the length of the Grand Canal and across the lagoon to the funerary island of San Michele, where they were buried in the Protestant cemetery.

== Publications ==
- Restoring Venice: the Church of the Madonna dell'Orto (with Philip Rylands), Paul Elek Ltd, London, 1977

Diplomatic posts
Preceded by Sir Victor Mallet	Ambassador Extraordinary and Plenipotentiary at Rome; 1953–1962	Succeeded by Sir John Ward
