= John Guthrie Ward =

British diplomat

Sir John (Guthrie) Ward GCMG (3 March 1909 – 12 January 1991) was a British diplomat. He was Ambassador to Argentina from 1957 to 1961, and Ambassador to Italy from 1962 to 1966.

Ward was appointed a Companion of the Order of Saint Michael and Saint George (CMG) in the 1947 New Year Honours, promoted to Knight Commander of the Order (KCMG) in the 1956 Birthday Honours, and further promoted to Knight Grand Cross of the Order (GCMG) in the 1967 New Year Honours.
