= Acqua =

Acqua may refer to:

== Places ==
- Acqua Fraggia or Acquafraggia, a short and frequently steep torrente (Italian: seasonal stream), in the province of Sondrio in Lombardy, north Italy

== People ==
- Antonio Acqua (November 1910 - 18 October 1976), Italian actor of the 1940s, 1950s and 1960s
- Camillo Acqua (30 August 1863 - 25 March 1936), Italian entomologist
- Robert Acquafresca, Italian footballer
- Stefano Dall'Acqua, Italian footballer
- Simone Dell'Acqua, Italian footballer

== Aqueducts ==
=== Ancient Rome ===
- Aqua Alexandrina, span: Pantano Borghese to the Baths of Alexander on the Campus Martius
- Aqua Alsietina, built in 2 BC, span: Lake Alsietina, now Lake Martignano, northwest of Rome to the Naumachia of Augustus in Transtiberim (Trastevere)
- Aqua Anio Novus, built in AD 52, span: Anio (Aniene) River, east of Rome to the Caelian Hill
- Aqua Anio Vetus, built in 272 - 269 BC, span: the Anio (Aniene) River near Vicovaro, east of Rome to the Viminal Hill
- Aqua Antoniniana, a branch of Aqua Marcia that pipes to the Baths of Caracalla on the Caelian Hill, then to the Aventine Hill and the Quirinal Hill
- Aqua Appia, completed in 311 B.C., span: the springs 10 miles (16 km) to the east of Rome to the Forum Boarium in Campus Martius
- Aqua Claudia, built in AD 52, span: the springs in Subiaco, east of Rome to Caelian Hill, later piped to the imperial palaces from the mid-first century on the Palatine Hill
- Aqua Julia, built in 33 BC, span: the springs near Subiaco, east of Rome to the Aventine Hill
- Aqua Marcia, built in 144 - 140 BC; span: the springs near Subiaco, east of Rome to the Capitoline Hill (the longest of the 11 aqueducts that supplied the city of ancient Rome)
- Aqua Tepula, completed in 125 BC, span: the springs near Subiaco, east of Rome, then on the same arches as those of the Aqua Marcia to the Aventine Hill
- Aqua Traiana (later rebuilt and named Acqua Paola), built in AD 109, span: the springs to the north of Lake Bracciano, northwest of Rome to Janiculum Hill
- Aqua Virgo, built in 19 BC, span: the springs near Via Collatina, east of Rome to the baths of Agrippa in Campus Martius

=== Modern Rome ===
- Acqua Appio-Allesandrino, completed in 1965, span: catchment basins along the volcano Angela at Pantano Borghese, Finocchi, Torre Angela
- Acqua Felice, completed in 1586, origin/terminus: the springs at Pantano Borghese, off Via Casilin to the fountain of Moses on the Quirinal Hill
- Acqua Paola, completed in 1611, span: Lake Bracciano, northwest of Rome to the fountain of Paul V on the Janiculum Hill, later piped to Vatican Hill
- Acqua Peschiera, completed in 1949, span: the springs in Sorgenti, northeast of Rome, branching to two termini, Peschiera Sinistra, approaching Rome from the east, and Peschiera Destra, taking a westward route to its terminus at the fountain of Piazzale degli Eroi, just north of Vatican Hill
- Acqua Pia Antica Marcia, completed in 1870, span: the springs near Subiaco, east of Rome to the fountain of the Naiads on the Viminal Hill; first built as a restoration of the classical Aqua Marcia
- Acqua Vergine, one of several Roman aqueducts that delivers pure drinking water to Rome; its name derives from its predecessor, Acqua Virgo
- Acqua Vergine Antica, completed in 1453, span: the springs in Salone, east of Rome to the fountain of Trevi on the Quirinal Hill
- Acqua Vergine Nuova, completed in 1937; span: the springs in Salone, east of Rome to its terminus the fountains in Piazza del Popolo and the fountains on the western slope of the Pincio, overlooking Piazza del Popolo

== Businesses and organizations ==
- Acqua & Sapone, a professional continental cycling team based in Italy that participated in UCI Europe Tour
- Acqua Limone, a Swedish clothing brand
- Acqua di Parma, an Italian lifestyle company that produces fragrances, candles, bathrobes and leather accessories
- Acqua Santa Golf Club Course, a golf course in Rome, Italy
- Acqua Panna, a company which bottles still water

== Other uses ==
- Acqua alta, (Italian: "high water"), the term used in Veneto for the exceptional tide peaks that occur periodically in the northern Adriatic Sea. The most known place where "acqua alta" occurs is Venice.
- Aqua Tofana, a strong poison

== See also ==
- Acqua pazza (disambiguation)
- Aquatic (disambiguation)
