= Acqua alta =

Exceptional periodic high tide peak

Acqua alta

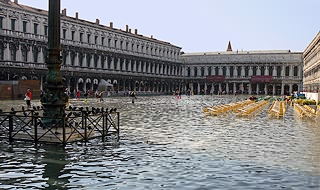
Venice, Piazza San Marco

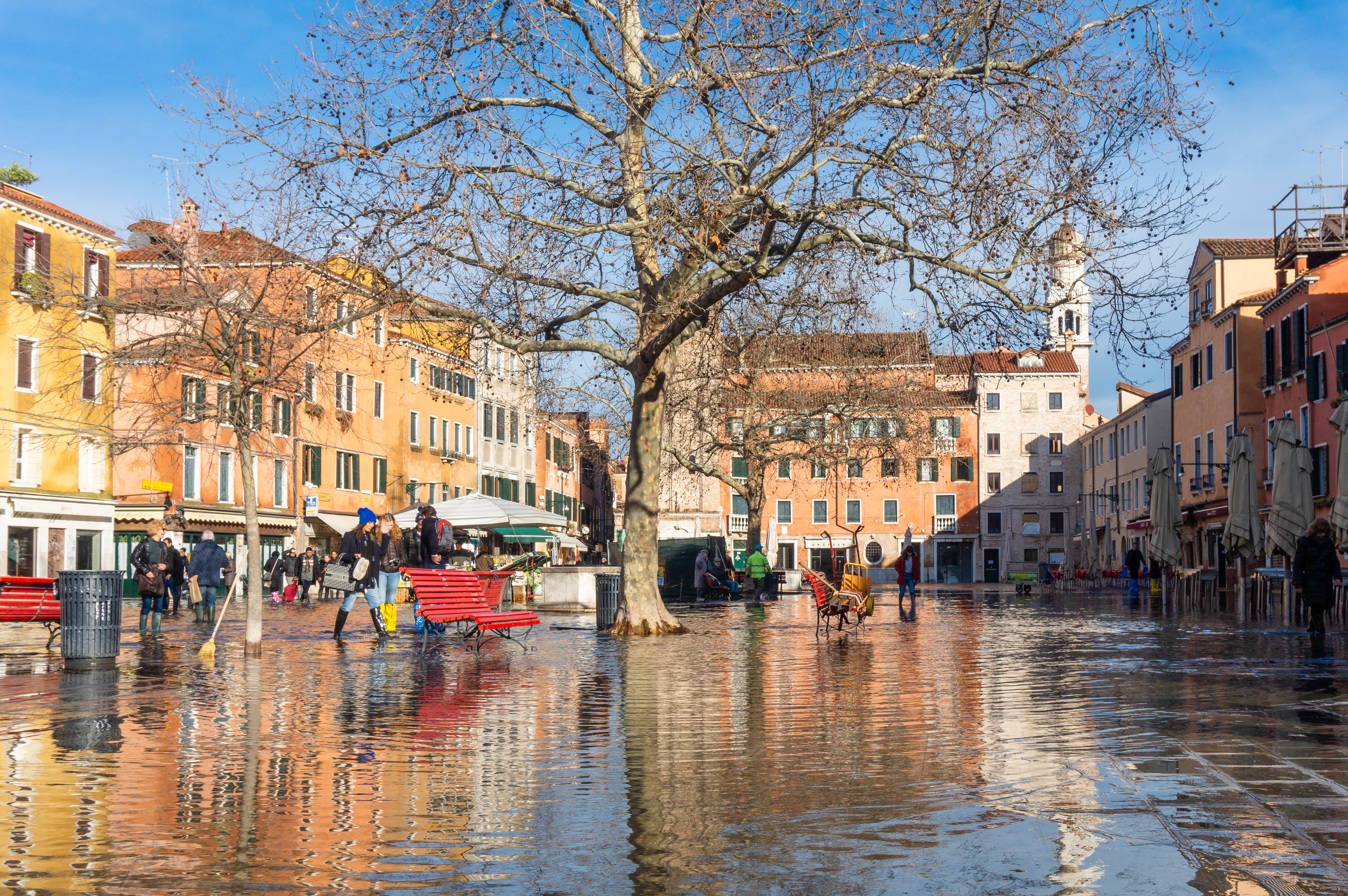
Venice, Campo Santa Margherita

An acqua alta (/ˌækwə ˈæltə/, Italian: [ˈakkwa ˈalta]; lit. 'high water') is an exceptional tide peak that occurs periodically in the northern Adriatic Sea. The term is applied to such tides in the Italian region of Veneto. The peaks reach their maximum in the Venetian Lagoon, where they cause partial flooding of Venice and Chioggia; flooding also occurs elsewhere around the northern Adriatic, for instance at Grado and Trieste, but much less often and to a lesser degree.

The phenomenon occurs mainly between autumn and spring, when the astronomical tides are reinforced by the prevailing seasonal winds that hamper the usual reflux. The main winds involved are the sirocco, which blows northbound along the Adriatic Sea, and the bora, which has a specific local effect due to the shape and location of the Venetian Lagoon.

== Causes ==
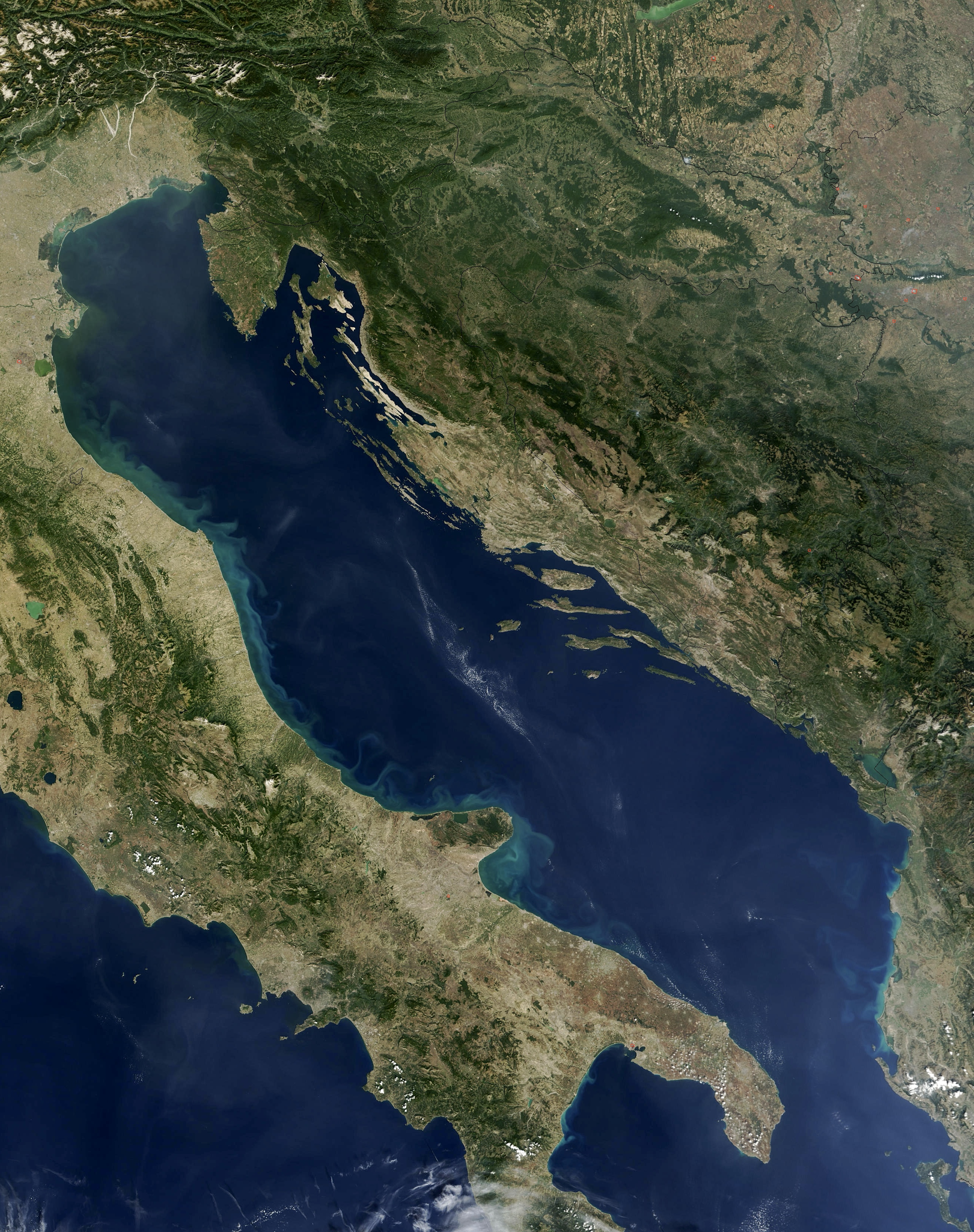
A satellite image of the Adriatic Sea, highlighting the long and narrow rectangular shape which is the source of an oscillating water motion (called seiche) along the minor axis. The oscillation, which has a period of 21 hours and 30 minutes and an amplitude around 0.5 metres at the axis' extremities, supplements the natural tidal cycle, so that the Adriatic sea experiences much more extreme tidal events than the rest of the Mediterranean.

Precise scientific parameters define the phenomenon called acqua alta, the most significant of which (i.e., the deviation in amplitude from a base measurement of "standard" tides) is measured by the hydrographic station located nearby the Basilica di Santa Maria della Salute. Supernormal tidal events can be categorised as:

- intense when the measured sea level is between 80 cm and 109 cm above the standard sea level (which was defined by averaging the measurements of sea level during the year 1897);
- very intense when the measured sea level is between 110 cm and 139 cm above the standard;
- exceptional high waters when the measured sea level reaches or exceeds 140 cm above the standard.

Generally speaking, the tide levels largely depend on three contributing factors:

- An astronomical component, which results from the movement and alignment of the Moon and the Sun; this component is dependent upon the laws of the astronomical mechanics and can be computed and accurately predicted for the long run (even years or decades)
- A geophysical component, primarily dependent upon the geometric shape of the basin, which amplifies or reduces the astronomical component and, because it is dependent upon the laws of the physical mechanics, can be also computed and accurately predicted for the long run (even years or decades);
- A meteorological component, linked to a large set of variables, such as the direction and strength of winds, the location of barometric pressure fields and their gradients, precipitation, etc. Because of their complex interrelations and quasi-stochastic behaviour, these variables cannot be accurately modeled in statistical terms. Consequently, this component can only be forecast for the very short run and is the principal determinant of acqua alta emergencies that catch Venetians unprepared.

Two further contributing natural factors are the subsidence, i.e. the natural sinking of the soil level, to which the lagoon is subject, and eustasy, i.e. the progressive rise of sea levels. While these phenomena would occur independently of human activity, their effects have increased because of inhabitation: the use of lagoonal water by the industries in Porto Marghera (now ceased) sped up subsidence, while global warming has been linked to increased eustasy. Venice's Centro Previsioni e Segnalazioni Maree (Tide Monitoring and Forecast Centre) evaluates that the city has lost 23 cm in its elevation since 1897, the year of reference, 12 of which are attributable to natural causes (9 because of eustasy, 3 because of subsidence), 13 are due to the additional subsidence caused by human activity, while the "elastic recovery" of the soil has allowed the city to "gain back" 2 cm. Because of sea level rise due to global warming, high tides of 110 cm, which currently occur around four times per year, are expected to increase to 60 times per year within 50 years.

=== Geophysical determinants linked to the Adriatic Sea ===
The long and narrow rectangular shape of the Adriatic Sea is the source of an oscillating water motion (called seiche) along the basin's minor axis.

The principal oscillation, which has a period of 21 hours and 30 minutes and an amplitude around 0.5 metres at the axis' extremities, supplements the natural tidal cycle, so that the Adriatic Sea has much more extreme tidal events than the rest of the Mediterranean. A secondary oscillation is also present, with an average period of 12 hours and 11 minutes.

Because the timeframe of both oscillations is comparable to naturally occurring (yet independent) astronomical tides, the two effects overlap and reinforce each other. The combined effects are more significant at the perigees, which correspond to new moons, full moons and equinoxes.

Should meteorological conditions (such as a strong sirocco wind blowing north along the major axis of the Adriatic basin) hamper the natural outflow of excess tidal water, high waters of greater magnitude can be expected in Venice.

=== Specific characteristics of the Venetian lagoon ===
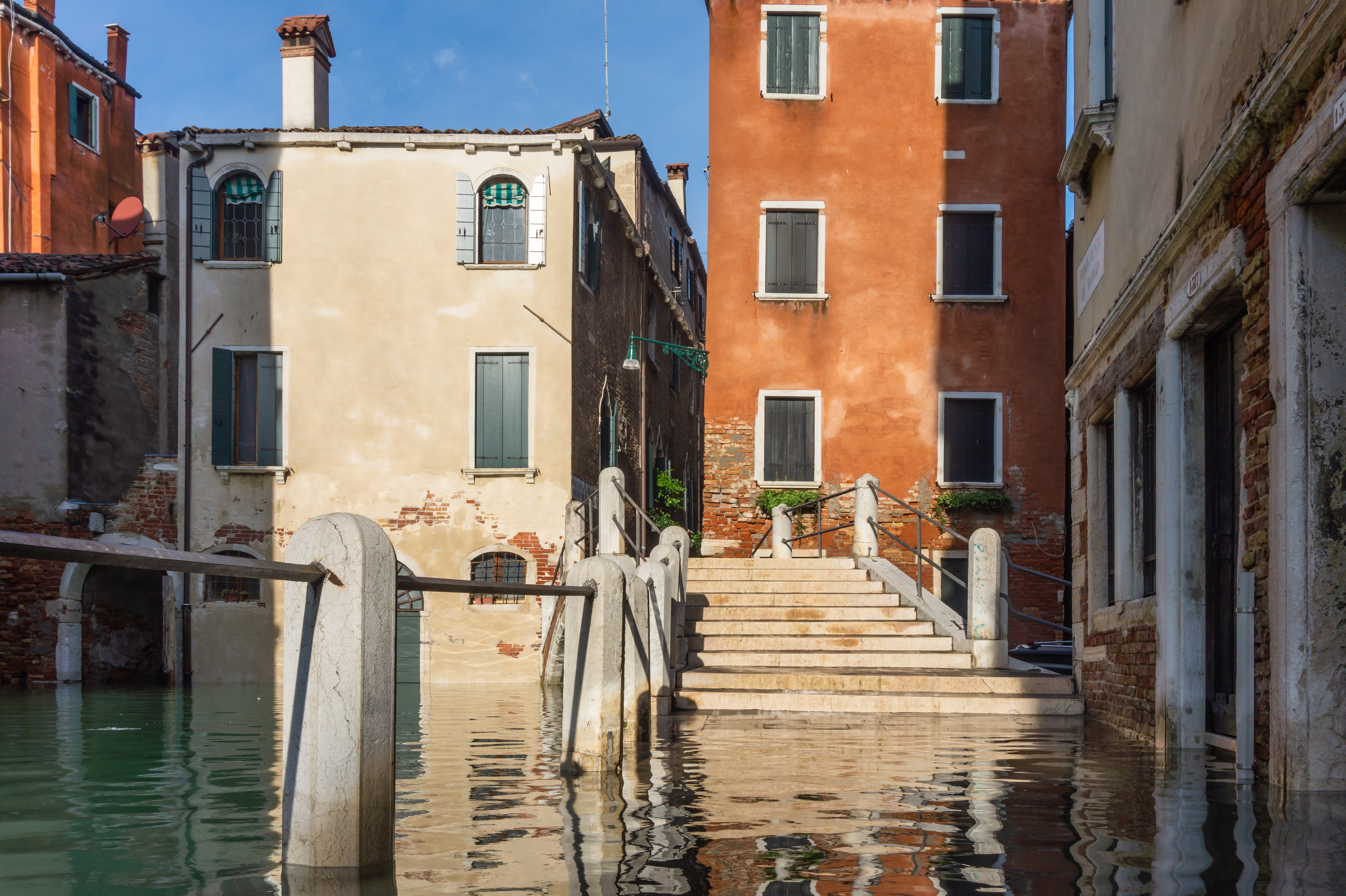
Acqua alta in Venice, fondamenta di Borgo, December 2019

The particular shape of the Venetian lagoon, the subsidence which has been affecting the soil in the coastal area, and the peculiar urban configuration all magnify the impact of the high waters on city dwellers and on the buildings.

Furthermore, the northbound winds called bora and sirocco often blow directly towards the harbours that connect the lagoon to the Adriatic Sea, significantly slowing down (and, at times, completing blocking) the outflow of water from the lagoon toward the sea. When this occurs, the ebb is prevented inside the lagoon, so that the following high tide overlaps with the previous one, in a perverse self-supporting cycle.

The creation of the industrial area of Porto Marghera, which lies immediately behind Venice, amplified the effects of high waters for two reasons: first, the land upon which the area is built was created by filling large parts of the lagoon where smaller islands just above sea level previously lay. These islands, called barene, acted as natural sponges (or "expansion tanks") when high tides occurred, absorbing a significant portion of the excess water.

Second, a navigable channel was carved through the lagoon to allow oil tankers to reach the piers. This "Oil Channel" physically linked the sea to the coastal line, running through the harbour in Malamocco and crossing the lagoon for its entire width. This direct connection to the sea, which was obviously non-existent at the time of Venice's foundation, has subjected the city to more severe high tides.

Porto Marghera and its facilities are not the only human-made contributors to higher tides. Rather, the municipality of Venice has published a study that suggests the following initiatives may have had an irreversible and catastrophic impact on the city's capacity to withstand acque alte in the future:

- the building of the Railroad Bridge (1841–1846) connecting Venice to the land, because its supporting pillars modify the natural motion of lagoonal water;
- the diversion of the river Brenta outside the Chioggia basin, which drained the 2.63 hectares of the river's delta that functioned as expansion tanks, absorbing extra lagoonal water during high tides;
- the building of offshore dammed piers (Porto di Malamocco, 1820–1872; Porto di S. Nicolò, 884–897; Porto di Chioggia, 1911–1933), which obviously restrict the natural movement of water;
- the building of the Ponte della Libertà (1931–1933), which connects Venice to the land;
- the building of the Riva dei Sette Martiri (1936–1941), an extension to the Riva degli Schiavoni;
- the building of the artificial island Tronchetto used as a car and bus terminal (17 hectares, 1957–1961):
- the doubling of the Railroad Bridge (1977).

== Acqua alta in Venice ==
=== Affected portions of the city ===
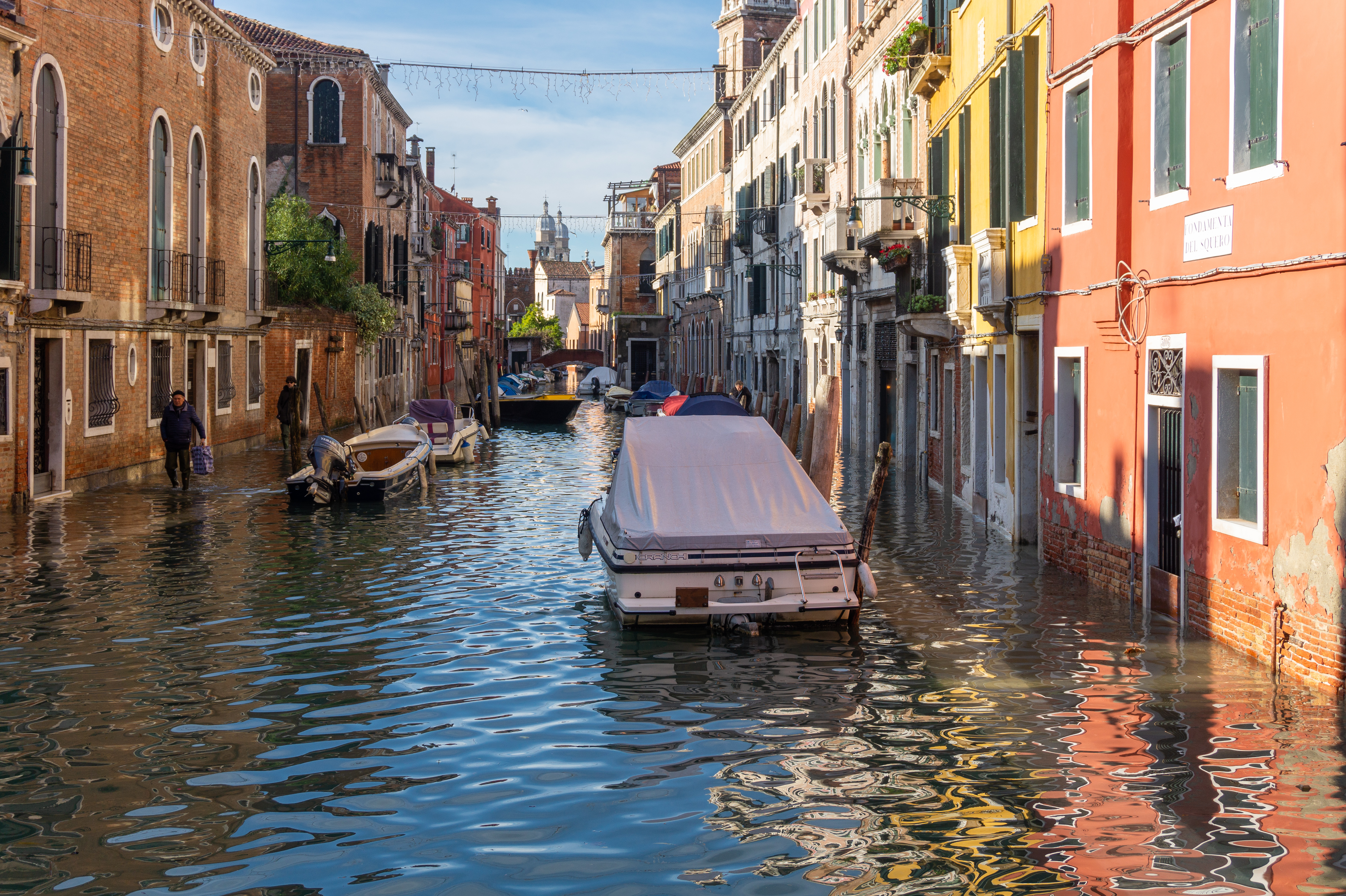
Fondamenta del Squero flooded in December 2019

The flooding caused by the acqua alta is not uniform throughout the city of Venice because of several factors, such as the varying altitude of each zone above sea level, its distance from a channel, the relative heights of the sidewalks or pavements (fondamenta), the presence of full parapets (which act as dams) along the proximate channel, and the layout of the sewer and water drainage network (which acts as a channel for the flooding, as it is directly connected with the lagoon).

These factors account for the severity and spread of a supernormal tidal phenomenon; as a city-commissioned study showed, a tide up to 90 cm above sea level leaves Venice virtually unaffected, while 50 cm of additional water affects more than half of the city. The study provided Venetians with the following reference guide:

Sea level	Area of Venice submerged (percent)
+90 cm	1.84%
+100 cm	5.17%
+110 cm	14.04%
+120 cm	28.75%
+130 cm	43.15%
+140 cm	54.39%
+150 cm	62.98%
+160 cm	69.43%
+170 cm	74.20%
+180 cm	78.11%
+190 cm	82.39%
+200 cm	86.4%

To assist pedestrian circulation during floods, the city installs a network of gangways (wide wooden planks on iron supports) on the main urban paths. This gangway system is generally set at 120 cm above the conventional sea level, and can flood as well when higher tides occur.

=== Monitoring, alerting and control ===
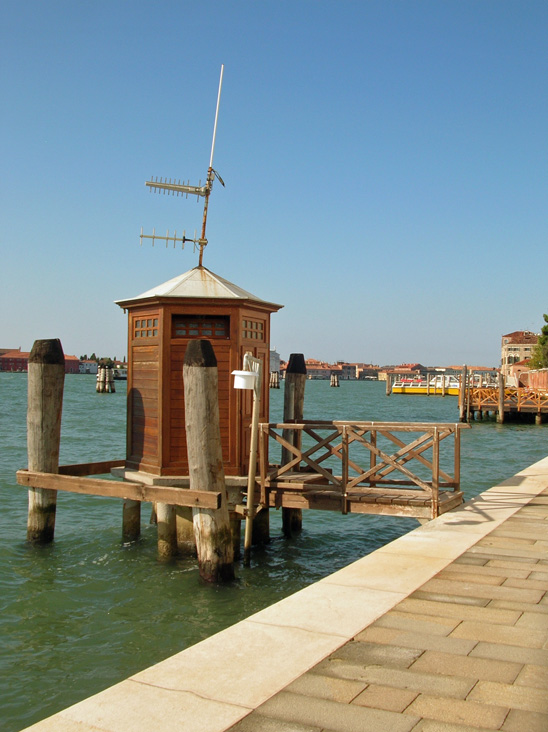
The reference hydrographic station at Punta della Salute

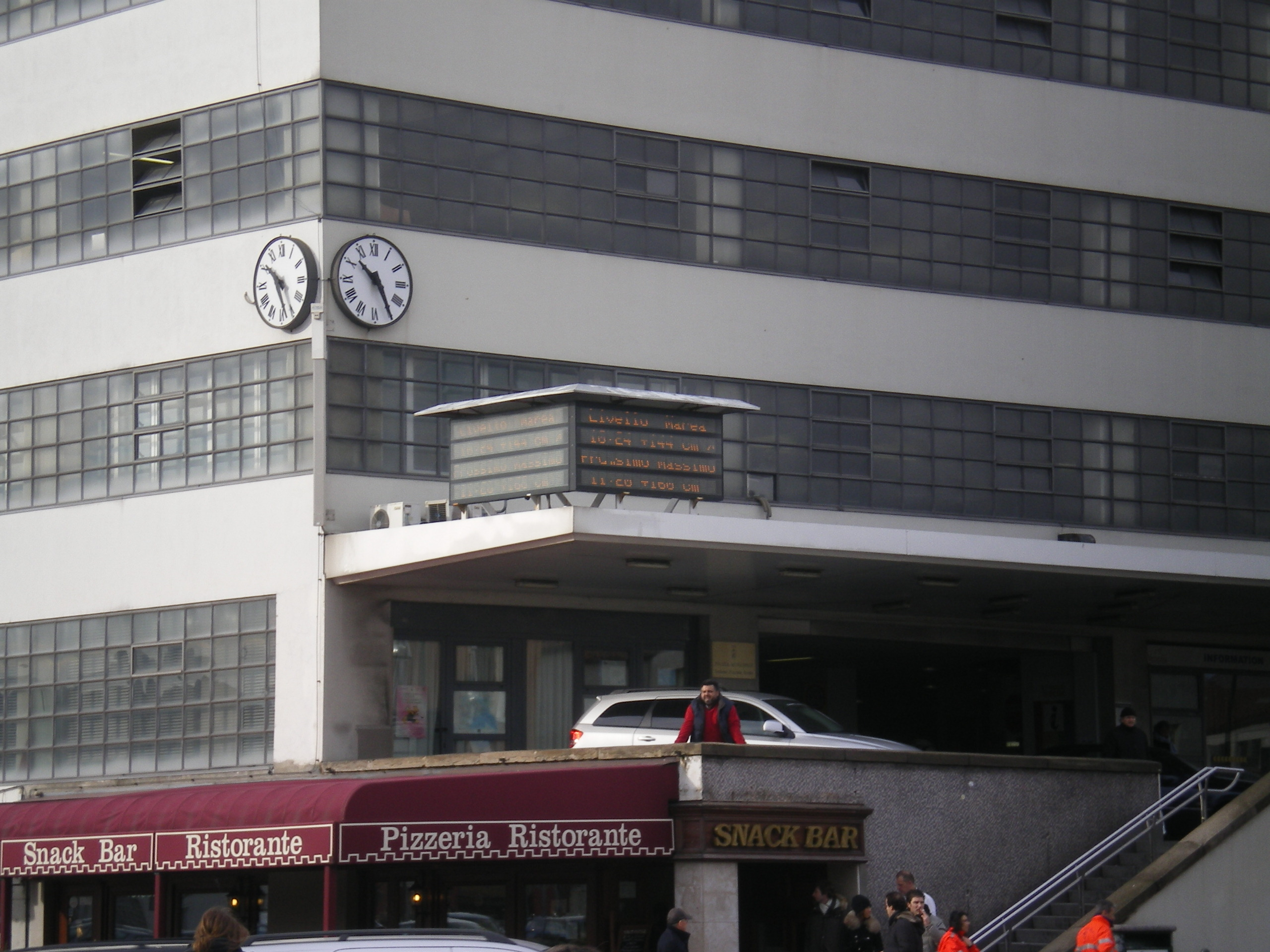
An electronic display showing the tide forecast in Piazzale Roma during the acqua alta of 1 December 2008

The Tide Monitoring and Forecast Centre of the City of Venice is fed information via a network of hydrographic stations, located in both the lagoon and the Adriatic Sea (on a scientific platform belonging to the Italian National Research Committee, CNR). The centre's unique expertise on the phenomenon enables it to produce forecasts of remarkable accuracy, usually for the following 48 hours (longer forecasts are also issued, but tend to be less reliable, as discussed above), by analysing the meteorological and hydrographic data available.

Forecasts are then announced to the population via the centre's website and dedicated phone lines, through local newspapers, on electronic displays, and at some stops of the vaporetti (public transport).

When an acqua alta event is forecast, owners of commercial and residential property that is likely to be affected are contacted by phone (a free service provided by the municipality) or SMS.
"Very intense" events warrant alerting the whole population, which is accomplished by sounding a dedicated system of sirens located throughout the city.

On 7 December 2007, the alert system was modified (in Venice alone) to signal the magnitude of expected "very intense" tidal events to the population; sirens sound a first "await instructions" whistle to catch the population's attention, then produce a sequence of whistles whose number increases with the expected tide level (according to a published equivalence table).

While not radically innovative, the new system communicates in greater detail the extent of the expected flooding to the population. The previous system, still used in the rest of the Venetian lagoon, only provides three levels of warning: the signal is sounded once for a tide above 110 cm., twice for tidal forecasts above 140 cm. and thrice for those above 160 cm. The new system was first used on 24 March 2008, communicating an accurately forecast tide level above 110 cm.

=== Countermeasures ===
The MOSE project (which stands for Modulo Sperimentale Elettromeccanico, i.e. "Experimental Electromechanical Module") has been under construction since 2003, the long time period partly because of budget constraints, and partly because of the sheer complexity of the undertaking. The project should significantly reduce the effects of "exceptional high waters" (but not those of lesser, yet detrimental, tidal events) by completing the installation of 79 separate 300-ton flaps hinged on the seabed between the lagoon and the Adriatic sea. While normally fully submerged and invisible, the flaps can be raised preemptively to create a temporary barrier, which is expected to protect the city from exceptional acqua alta.

== Statistics ==
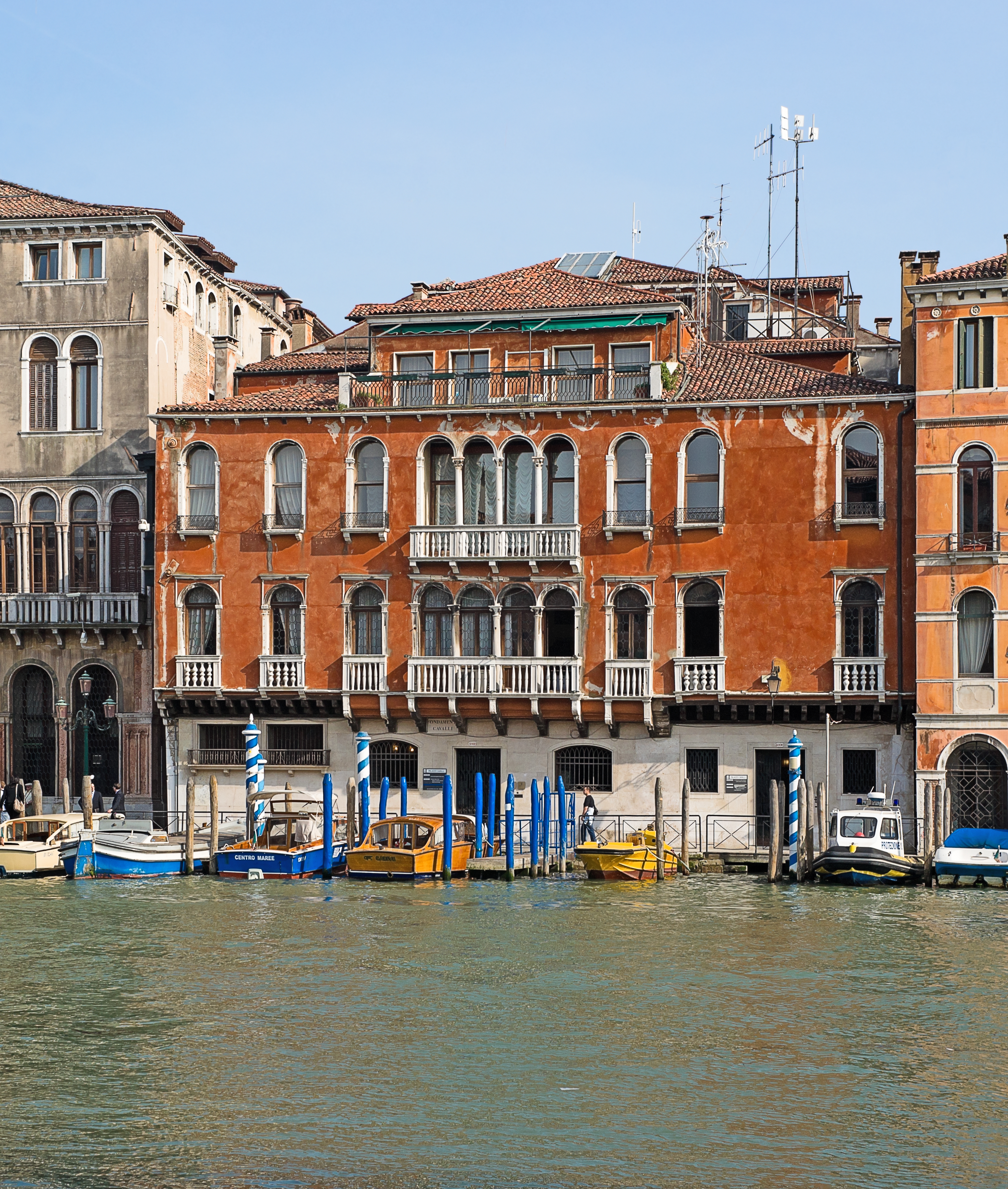
Tide Monitoring and Forecast Centre

Regular scientific record-keeping of lagoonal water levels is considered to have begun in 1872, although some researchers suggest pushing this date to 1867, when an exceptional event (153 cm above sea level) was measured. However, because the first modern marigraph for regular tide monitoring was installed in Venice only in 1871, most documentation on the subject adopts the following year as the golden standard.

The Venetian Institute for Science, Literature and Arts was appointed to the task by the newly formed Italian Kingdom, thus replacing the Magistrato alle Acque in 1866 upon annexing the city. The Institute ceased to exercise its monitoring and record-keeping functions in 1908, when the task, along with records and instruments, was passed to the Hydrographic Office of Venice.

After the unprecedented acqua alta of 1966, the city set up a dedicated service to analyse data, monitor fluctuations, and forecast high tides, which is also charged with continuously keeping the population informed. Renamed Tide Monitoring and Forecast Centre in 1980, the service has absorbed the record-keeping functions of the Hydrographic Office.

=== Historical records ===
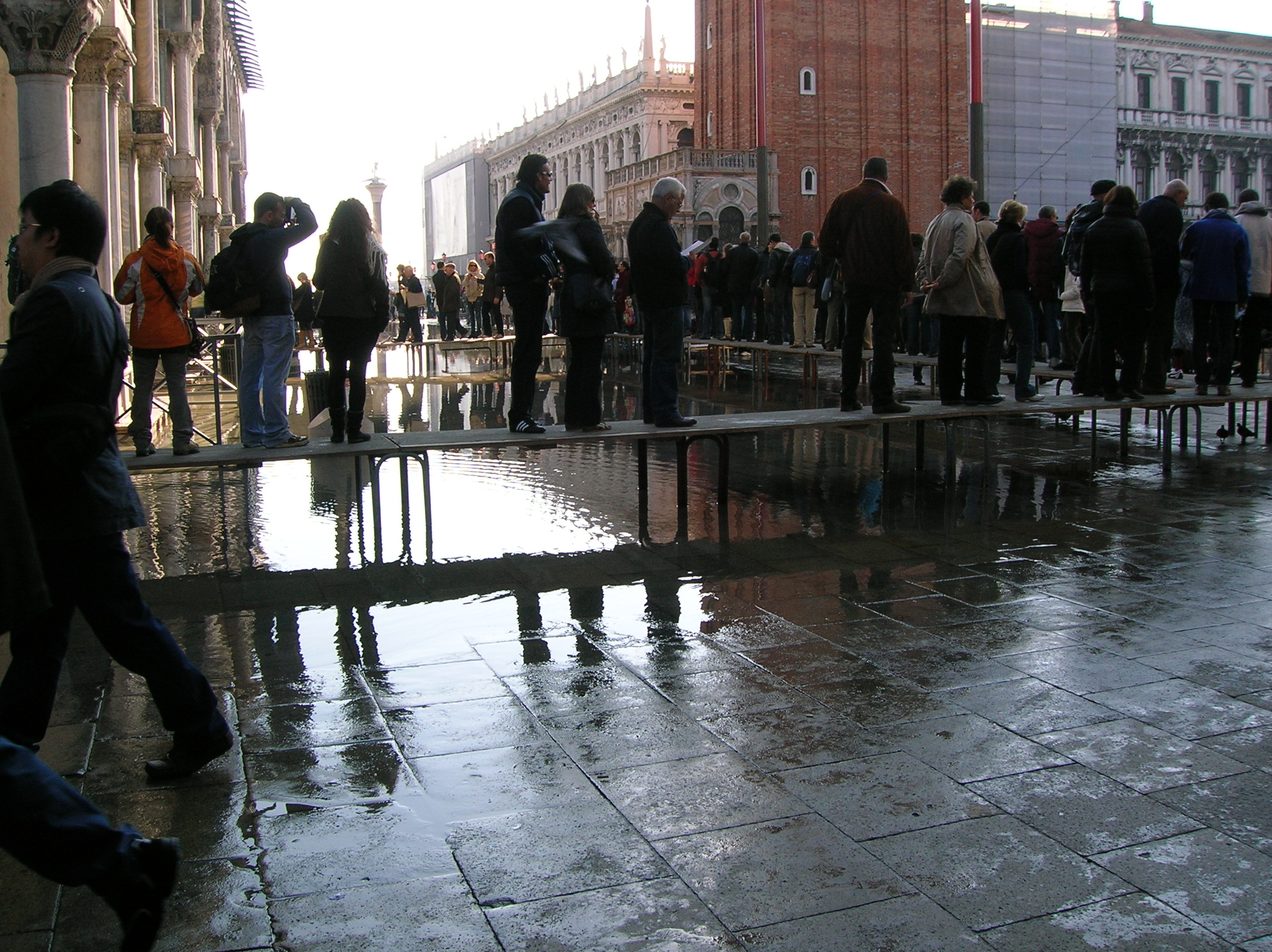
Tourists on the gangways queueing to enter the San Marco Basilica

==== Early records ====
The first record of a large flood in the Venetian lagoon dates back to the so-called Rotta della Cucca, reported by Paul the Deacon as having occurred on 17 October 589. According to Paul, all rivers with mouths in the northern Adriatic, from the Tagliamento to the Po, overflowed at the same time, completely modifying the hydro-geologic equilibrium of the lagoon.

==== Middle Ages ====
The first documented description of acqua alta in Venice concerns the year 782 and is followed by other documented events in 840, 885, and 1102.

In 1110 the water, following a violent sea storm (or, possibly, a seaquake and its subsequent tsunami), completely destroyed Metamauco (ancient name for Malamocco), Venice's political centre before the Doge's residence was moved to Rialto.

Local chroniclers report that in 1240 "the water (that) flooded the streets (was) higher than a man". Other events are recorded to have occurred in 1268, 1280, 1282, and on 20 December 1283, which was probably an abnormally significant event, since a chronicle reported that Venice was "saved by a miracle".

Chroniclers report that high tides occurred in 1286, 1297, and 1314; on 15 February 1340; on 25 February 1341; on 18 January 1386; and on 31 May and 10 August 1410.

In the 15th century, high tides were recorded in 1419 and 1423, on 11 May 1428, and on 10 October 1430, as well as in 1444 and 1445. On 10 November 1442, the water is reported to have risen "four feet above the usual".

==== Modern era ====
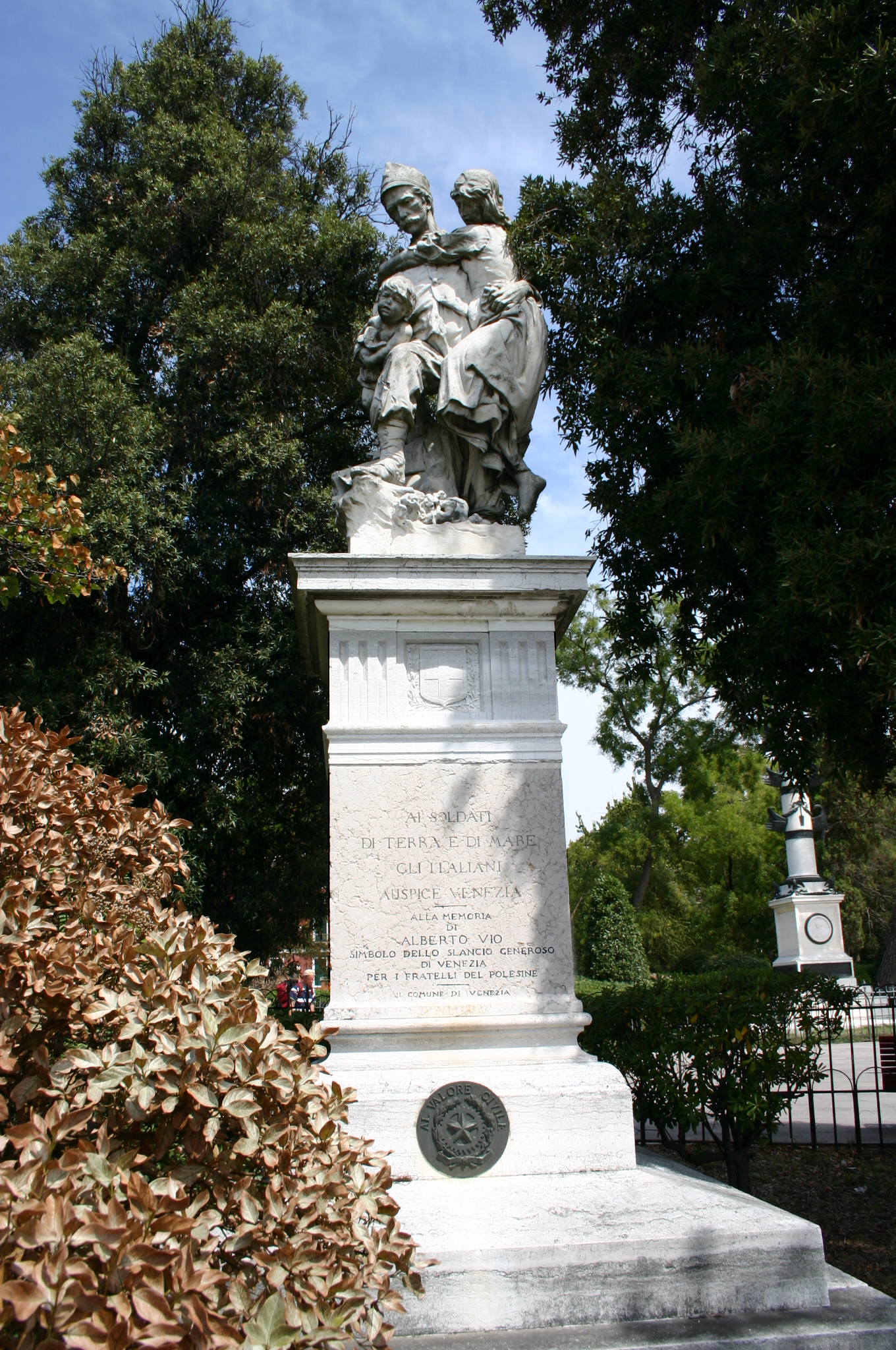
Monument to sea and land soldiers, sculpted by Augusto Benvenuti, to commemorate the help given by the army during the catastrophic 1882 flood (Biennale gardens)

High waters were recorded on 29 May 1511; in 1517; on 16 October 1521; on 3 October and, again, on 20 December 1535. Local chronicles also attest to floods occurring in 1543; on 21 November 1550; on 12 October 1559; and in 1599.

The year 1600 was characterised by a high frequency of events, with floods on 8 December as well as 18–19 December. The latter event was probably remarkable, since there are also records of very violent sea storms that, having "broken indeed the shores in several places, entered the towns of Lido Maggiore, Tre Porti, Malamocco, Chiozza, et cetera".

Another noteworthy acqua alta took place on 5 November 1686. Several chronicles of the time, among them one written by a scientist, concur in reporting that "the waters reached the outdoor floor of ... [Sansovino's] Lodge", which is the monumental entrance to the Campanile di San Marco. A similar level was reached during the exceptional flood of 4 November 1966, which allowed scholars in the late 1960s to recreate a likely scenario for the 1686 flood. After accounting for the rebuilding of the Lodge after the 1902 fall of the Campanile and for subsidence, estimates concluded that the tide may have been as high as 254 cm above today's standard sea level.

In the 18th century, records became more abundant and precise, reporting acque alte on 21 December 1727; 31 December 1738; 7 October 1729; 5 and 28 November 1742; 31 October 1746; 4 November 1748; 31 October 1749; 9 October 1750; 24 December 1792; and on 25 December 1794.

Finally, in the decades before the installation of the marigraphs, high waters are recorded to have occurred on 5 December 1839, as well as in 1848 (140 cm) and 1867 (153 cm).

==== Exceptional high waters since 1923 ====
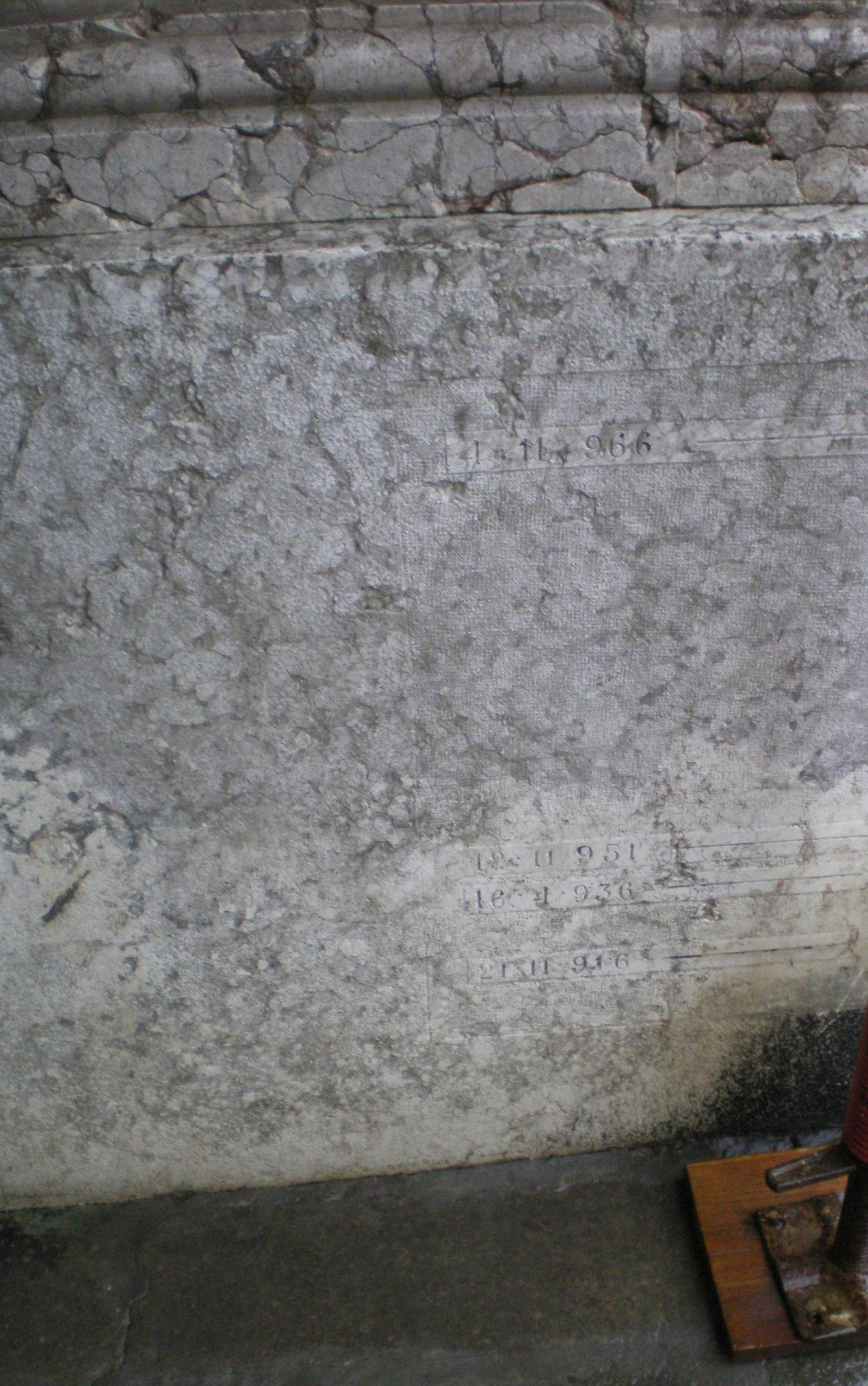
Water levels engraved on the walls of Ca' Farsetti, Venice's City Hall

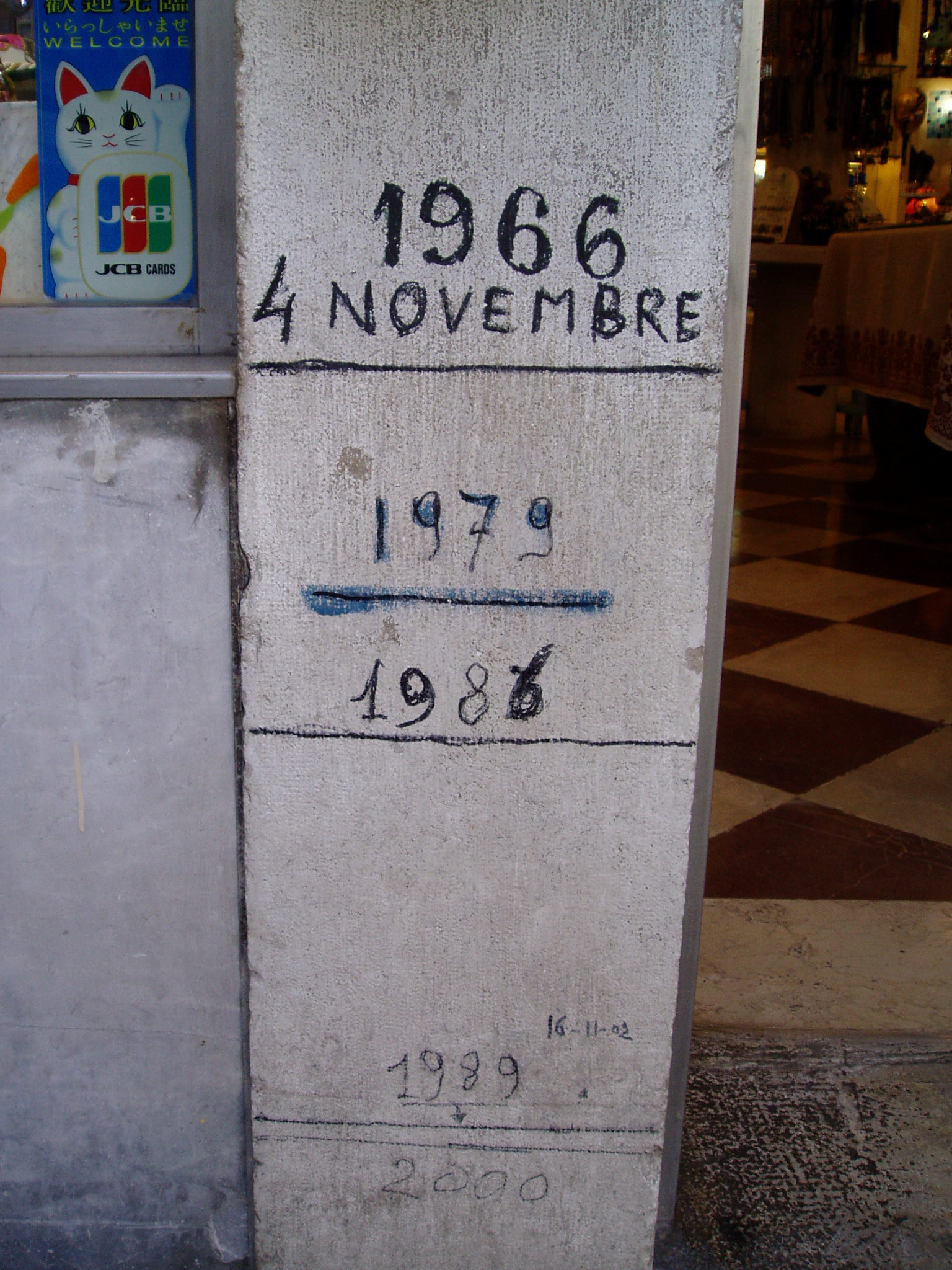
Levels reached by high waters painted outside a Venice shop

These are the highest water levels documented by the Tide Monitoring and Forecast Centre of Venice:

Sea level	Date
194 cm	4 November 1966
187 cm	12 November 2019
166 cm	22 December 1979
158 cm	1 February 1986
156 cm	29 October 2018
156 cm	1 December 2008
154 cm	15 November 2019
152 cm	17 November 2019
151 cm	12 November 1951
150 cm	18 November 2019
149 cm	11 November 2012
147 cm	16 April 1936
147 cm	16 November 2002
145 cm	25 December 2009
145 cm	15 October 1960
144 cm	13 November 2019
144 cm	23 December 2009
144 cm	3 November 1968
144 cm	6 November 2000
143 cm	12 February 2013
143 cm	1 November 2012
142 cm	8 December 1992
140 cm	17 February 1979

- Maximum high tide level: 194 cm, recorded on 4 November 1966
- Minimum ebb tide level: −121 cm, recorded on 14 February 1934
- Maximum difference between a high tide and the following ebb tide: 163 cm, recorded on 28 January 1948 and on 28 December 1970
- Maximum difference between an ebb tide and the following high tide: 146 cm, recorded on 23–24 February 1928 and on 25 January 1966

== In popular culture ==
In Kozue Amano's utopian science fantasy manga series Aria and its anime adaptation, acqua alta is a phenomenon that happens in the lands on Mars referred to as Neo Venezia.

Donna Leon refers to acqua alta in multiple books in her Commissario Guido Brunetti Mystery Series, set in and around Venice. For example:

- In Acqua Alta (1996), book 5, acqua alta is an important plot point, as the title suggests.
- In Friends in High Places (2000), book 9, the residence of a bureaucrat who died mysteriously has a "high step the residents no doubt hoped would raise their front hall about the level of acqua alta", and inside, "There was a small entrance, little more than a metre wide, up from which rose two steps, further evidence of the Venetians' eternal confidence that they could outwit the tides that gnawed away perpetually at the foundations of the city. The room to which the steps led was clean and neat and surprisingly well lit for an apartment located on a piano rialzato (raised ground floor)".

In the popular manga and anime One Piece by Eiichiro Oda, Season 8 is set in Water 7, a city inspired by Venice. This season introduces the phenomenon of Aqua Laguna, an annual event in which rising water levels completely floods the lower part of the city, causing massive damage to it.

== Bibliography ==
- Miozzi, Eugenio (1969). Venezia nei Secoli (in Italian). Vol. III, La laguna. Venezia: Casa Editrice Il Libeccio. p. 513.
- Davide Battistin; Paolo Canèstrelli (2006). La serie storica delle maree a Venezia (in Italian). Venezia: Centro Previsioni e Segnalazioni maree. p. 208.
- Canestrelli, Paolo; Alberto Tomasin; Angelo Voltan (1983). Uno schema empirico di facile uso per la previsione della marea a Venezia (in Italian). Venezia: Centro Previsioni e Segnalazioni maree. p. 11.
- Giordani Soika, Antonio (1976). Venezia e il problema delle acque alte (in Italian). Venezia: Museo civico di storia naturale di Venezia. p. 120.
