= Mestre =

Borough of Venice, Italy

- Mestre-Carpenedo borough of Venice
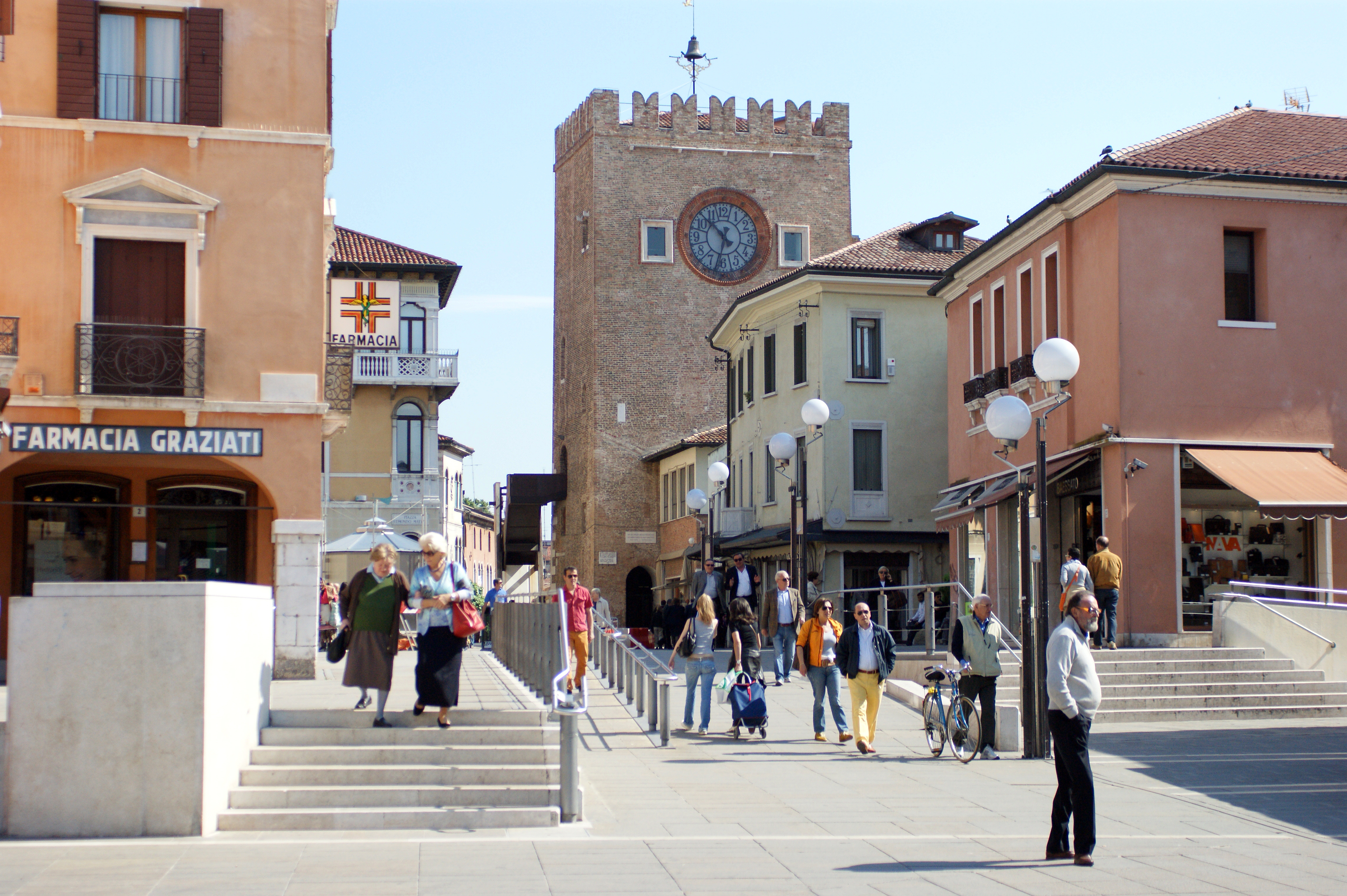
- The clock tower in Piazza Ferretto
- Interactive map of Mestre
- Coordinates: 45°29′26″N 12°14′17″E
- Country: Italy
- Region: Veneto
- Metropolitan city: Venice
- Municipality: Venice

Area
  - Total: 14.254 km^{2} (5.504 sq mi)
- Elevation: 3 m (9.8 ft)

Population (27-6-2019)
  - Total: 88,552
  - Density: 6,212.43/km^{2} (16,090.1/sq mi)
- Postal code: 30170
- Area code: 041

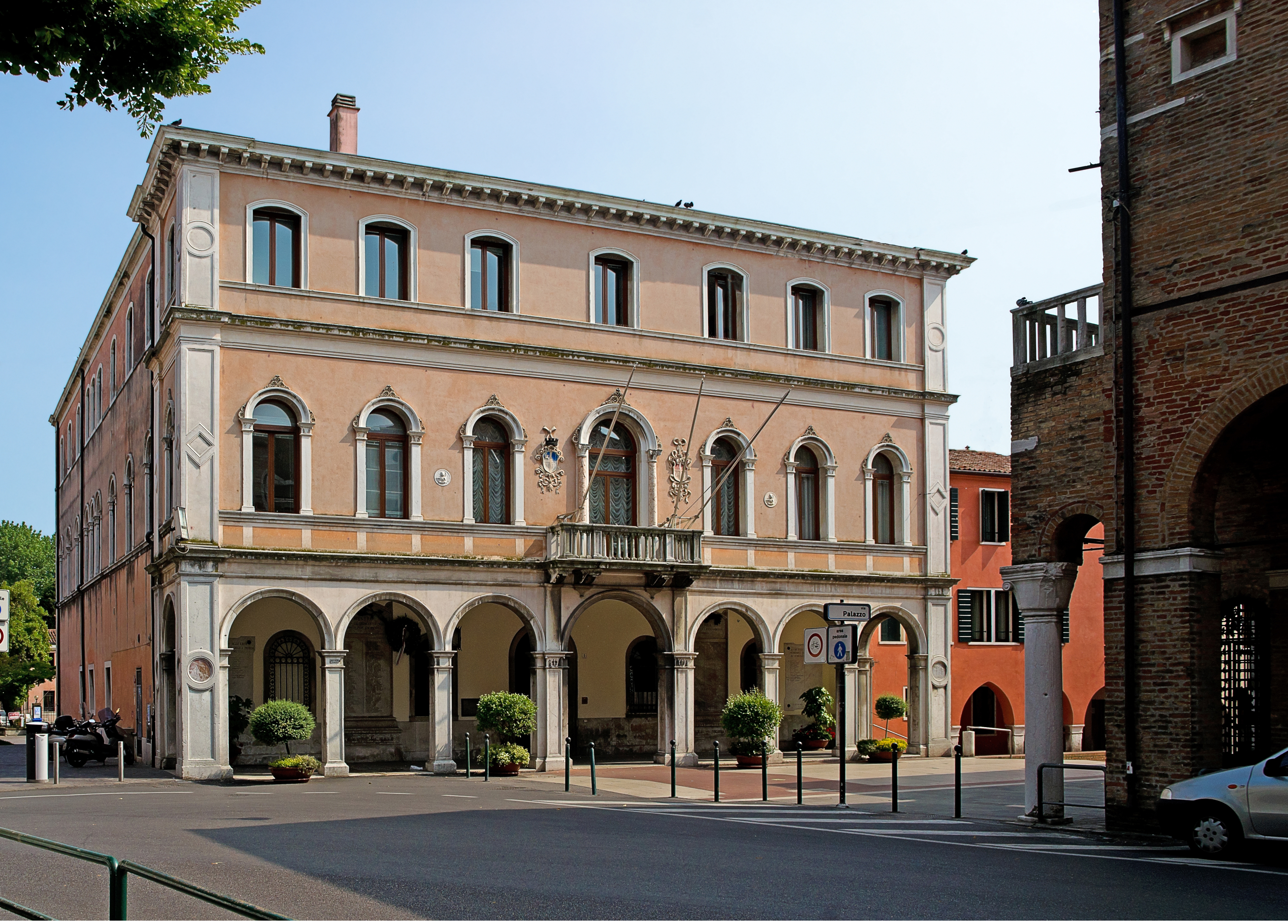
Il Palazzo Podestarile, the City Hall of Mestre

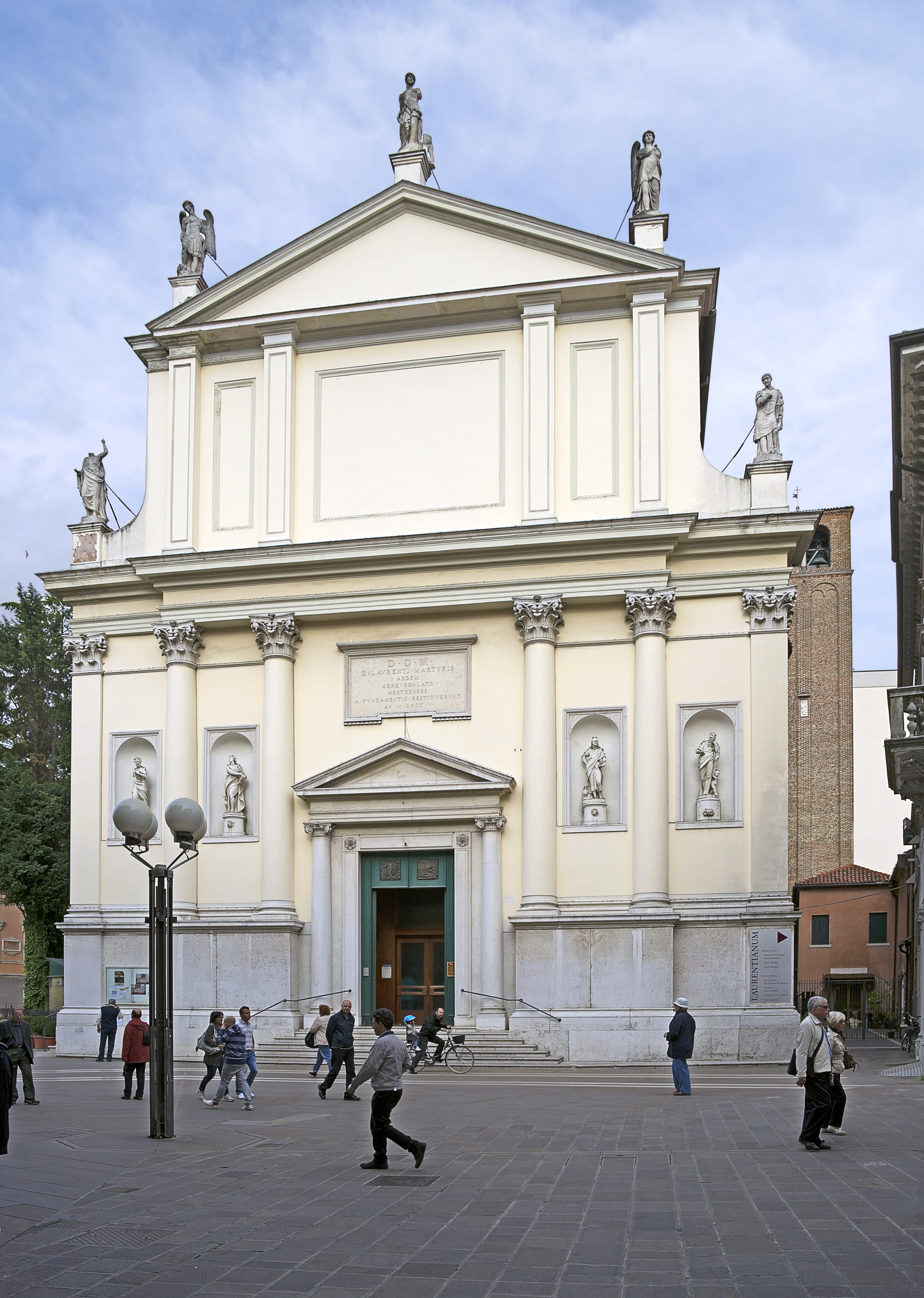
Duomo of St. Lawrence

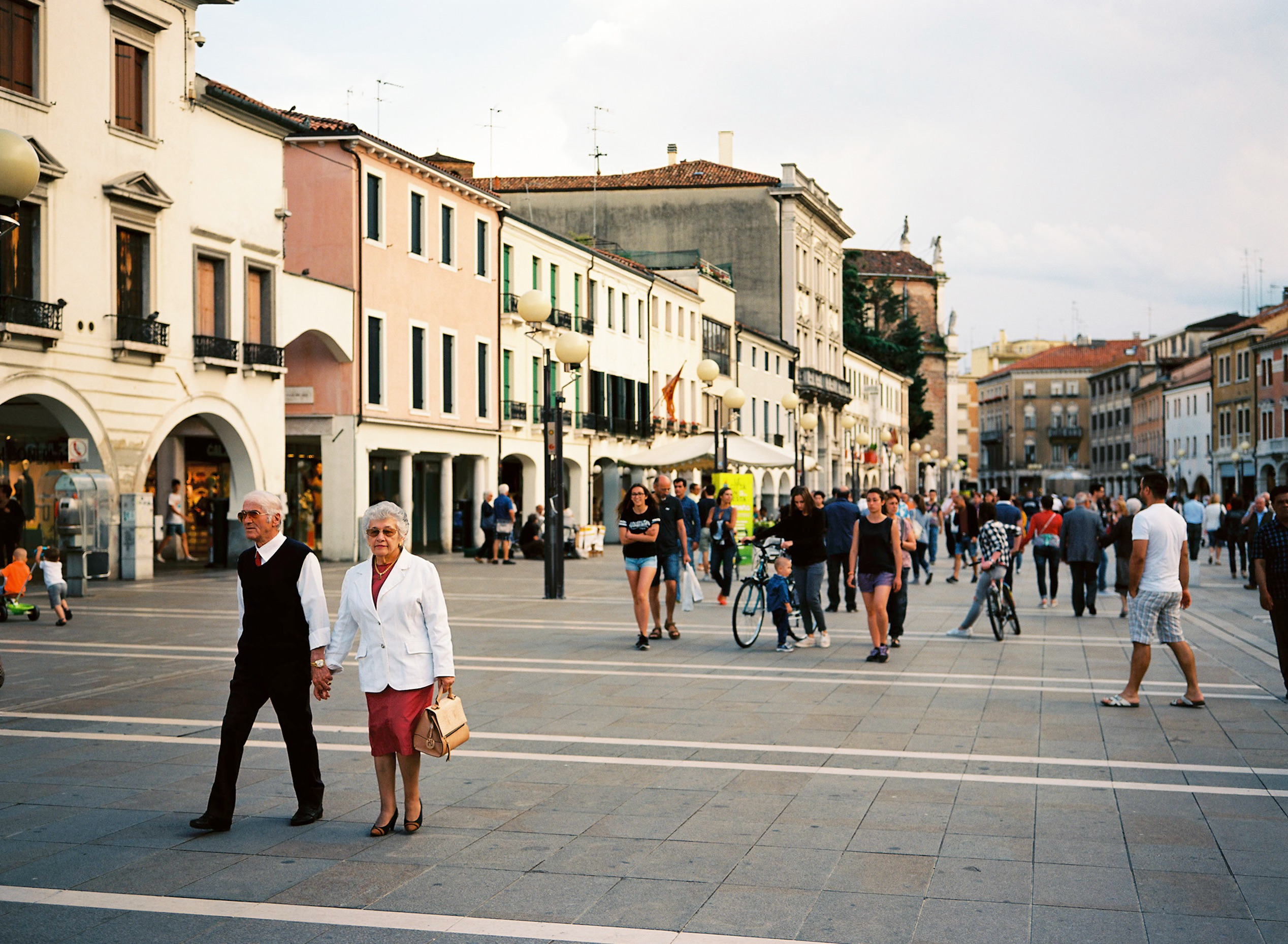
Piazza Ferretto, 2016

Mestre (Italian pronunciation: [ˈmɛstre]) is a borough of the comune of Venice on the mainland opposite the historical island city in the region of Veneto, Italy.

Administratively, Mestre forms (together with the nearby Carpenedo) the Municipalità di Mestre-Carpenedo, one of the six boroughs or districts of the comune. Sometimes it is considered as a frazione. With 88,552 (2019) inhabitants, Mestre is the most populated urban centre of the comune. The population of the borough of Mestre-Carpenedo is 89,373 (2010).

== Overview ==
The mainland of Venice is the territory on the coast of the Lagoon of Venice, off the Adriatic sea in northeastern Italy. It is connected to Venice proper by a 3,850 m (2.39 miles) long railway and road bridge over the lagoon called Ponte della Libertà (Freedom Bridge).

After World War II, Mestre had a fast and disorganized period of urban growth and became a large metropolitan area together with the other urban centers on the Venetian mainland (Carpenedo, Marghera, Favaro Veneto, Chirignago, Zelarino, Tessera). Because Mestre is the hub and the most populated area of the mainland shore, in common parlance, its toponym is often misused to designate the whole Venetian mainland.

Mestre became a comune in 1806 and remained so until 1926 when it was incorporated into the comune of Venice with adjacent portions of the mainland and islands in the lagoon.

== Population ==
Mestre has around 88,552 inhabitants, while the Municipalità di Mestre-Carpenedo (one of the six boroughs of the city of Venice) has 89,373 inhabitants. The Venetian mainland (the boroughs of Mestre-Carpenedo, Marghera, Chirignago-Zelarino, and Favaro Veneto) has around 181,000 inhabitants.

In contrast, there are just around 53,000 inhabitants in Venice city (San Marco, Castello, Cannaregio, San Polo, Dorsoduro, Santa Croce) and just approximately 27,700 in the other major islands of Venice city borough (Murano, Burano, Mazzorbo and Torcello). Adjacent multi island borough of Lido Pellestrina, which makes a total of around 80,700 inhabitants based on the islands of the municipality, thus making Mestre Venice municipality's largest population centre with approximately one-third of the total.

== Public transport ==
Public transport is managed by Azienda del Consorzio Trasporti Veneziano. There are several bus routes and two tram lines. Several bus routes link the mainland with piazzale Roma, the main bus station in Venice, via Ponte della Libertà, the bridge that connects Venice to the mainland.

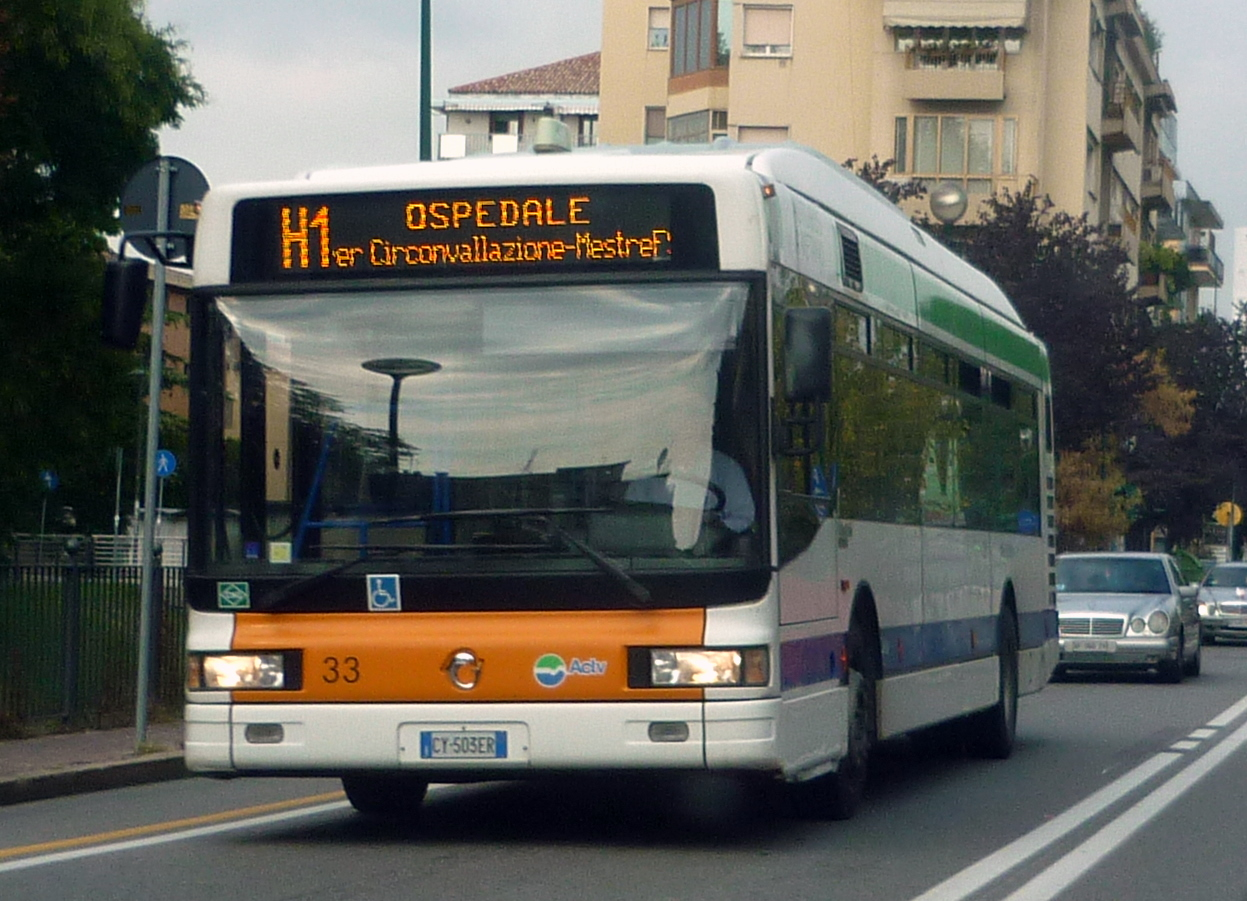
Bus in Mestre

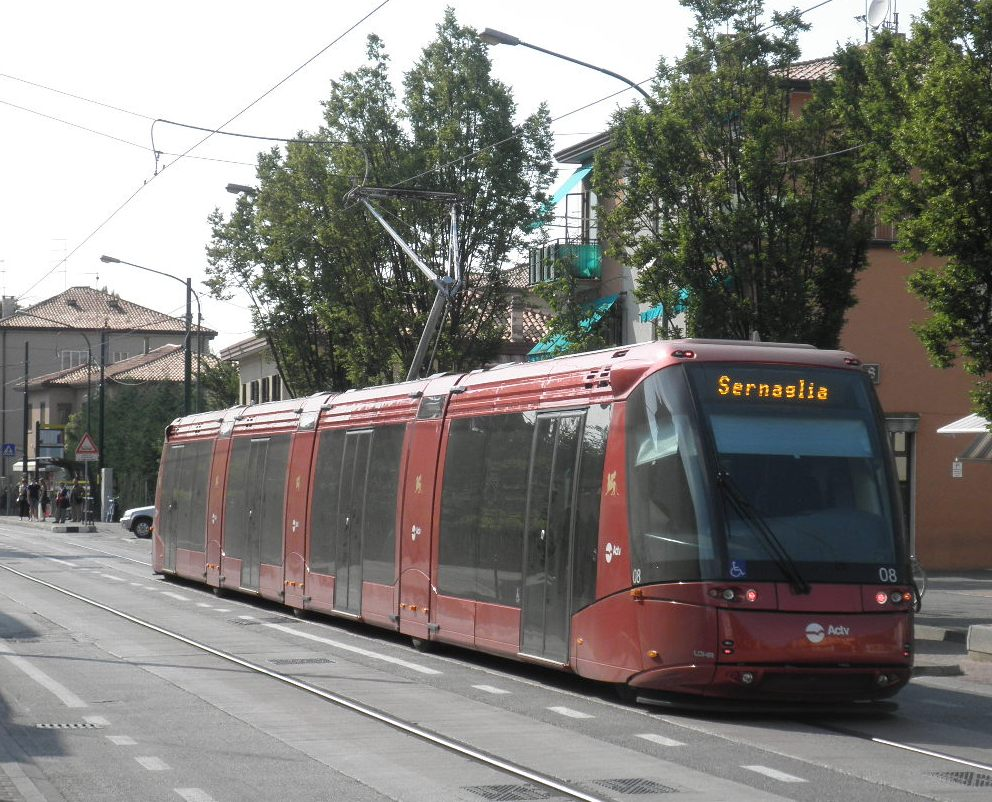
Tram in Mestre

== History ==
According to legend, Mestre was founded by Mesthles, a companion of the hero Antenor, a fugitive from Troy, who founded Padua. The true origins of the town are uncertain. However, it is known that a Roman oppidum (fortress) existed here. Attila destroyed the settlement, probably rebuilt in the 10th century.

The first historical attestation of Mestre is in the charter of the Holy Roman Emperor Otto III, in which Rambald, the count of Treviso, received land in an area named Mestre. In 1152, a papal bull by Pope Eugene III recognized the bishop of Treviso as lord of Mestre. He mentioned the existence of the church of St. Lawrence, a castle (Castelvecchio, Old Castle), and a port. In 1257 the bishop granted Mestre to Alberico da Romano, the podestà of Treviso. In 1274, a fire destroyed the castle, and Mestre's inhabitants fortified the town with a palisade, which became Castelnuovo (Newcastle). No traces of this castle remain today.

In 1323, the Scaligeri family from Verona conquered Treviso and thus acquired Mestre. The Venetians, fearing Verona's excessive power in the mainland, conquered Mestre on 29 September 1337. They replaced the old fortification with a brick wall, eight towers, and a moat. The port of Mestre benefited from the economic power of the Republic of Venice, forming Venice's primary connection with the mainland. A canal (the Canal Salso) was built to facilitate the transport of goods.

The Venetian domination of Mestre ended on 16 July 1797 with Napoleon's occupation of the Republic of Venice. In 1806, Mestre, following the French model, became a free municipality. It remained so under the subsequent period of Austrian rule (it also incorporated Carpenedo e Marocco) and under the Kingdom of Italy. In 1923, it was given the status of a town. Three years later, a Royal Decree incorporated Mestre and some other neighbouring townships (Chirignago, Zelarino, and Favaro Veneto) into the comune of Venice.

Since then, attempts have been made to regain autonomy in four referendums in 1979, 1989, 1994, and 2003, but in each instance, the proposal for separating Mestre from Venice was rejected. Another referendum, proposed by the president of the Veneto region, took place on 1 December 2019. Even though 66% of the voters voted for the separation, only 21% of the population voted, thus making the referendum not valid.

In the 1960s and 1970s, Mestre experienced a population boom, fuelled mainly by constructing a large industrial zone in nearby Marghera.

== Tourism ==
Mestre is now a location for tourists visiting Venice on a budget due to its convenience, its cheap and frequent connections to Venice by train and by bus (which also runs at night), and the prices of its bars, discos, car parking, hotels, restaurants, and supermarkets compared to the costs of the same tourist services in Venice.

In 1979, Mestre provided one of the venues for the European basketball championship EuroBasket 1979. This drew many tourists to the town. The other venues were in Siena, Gorizia and Turin.

=== Main sights ===
- Duomo of St. Lawrence (17th century)
- Palazzo da Re
- Palazzo podestarile
- Provvedaria
- Torre dell'Orologio (Watchtower, 1108)

=== Museums ===
- M9 Museum, inaugurated in 2018.

=== Points of interest ===
- Orto Botanico Locatelli, a small botanical garden

== In popular culture ==
Donna Leon's third Commissario (inspector) Guido Brunetti mystery novel The Anonymous Venetian (1994), aka Dressed for Death, starts with a battered body found behind a slaughterhouse near Marghera — just inside the border of Mestre. The staff of the local inspector is considered inadequate, so Brunetti is assigned to lead the investigation of the Mestre police.

In 2019, Italian-German singer Marco di Colonia released an album dedicated to Mestre's life and the people.

Mestre also features in Alice Guerra’s whimsical crime novels Dieci cose che ho imparato da Jessica Fletcher and Non chiamatemi Jessica Fletcher.

== See also ==
- A.C. Mestre, the local football (soccer) club, currently playing in Serie C
- Reyer Venezia, a men's basketball club nominally representing Venice but playing home games in Mestre, currently in Lega A
- Basket Mestre 1958, another men's basketball club that both represents and plays in Mestre, currently in Serie C
- Trams in Mestre
