= Aquatics =

Aquatics may refer to:

- Aquatic sports in the Olympics and other international competitions, including the disciplines of swimming, diving, synchronized swimming, water polo, and open water swimming
- Water-related sports more broadly (including boat racing, water skiing, swimming, etc.); see List of water sports
- Water-based techniques or modalities used for aquatic therapy
- Golfing term occasionally used to describe a water hazard
- Aquatic plants

== See also ==
- Aquatic (disambiguation)
