= People Mover (Venice) =

People mover in Venice

Coordinates: 45°26′23.15″N 12°18′47.77″E

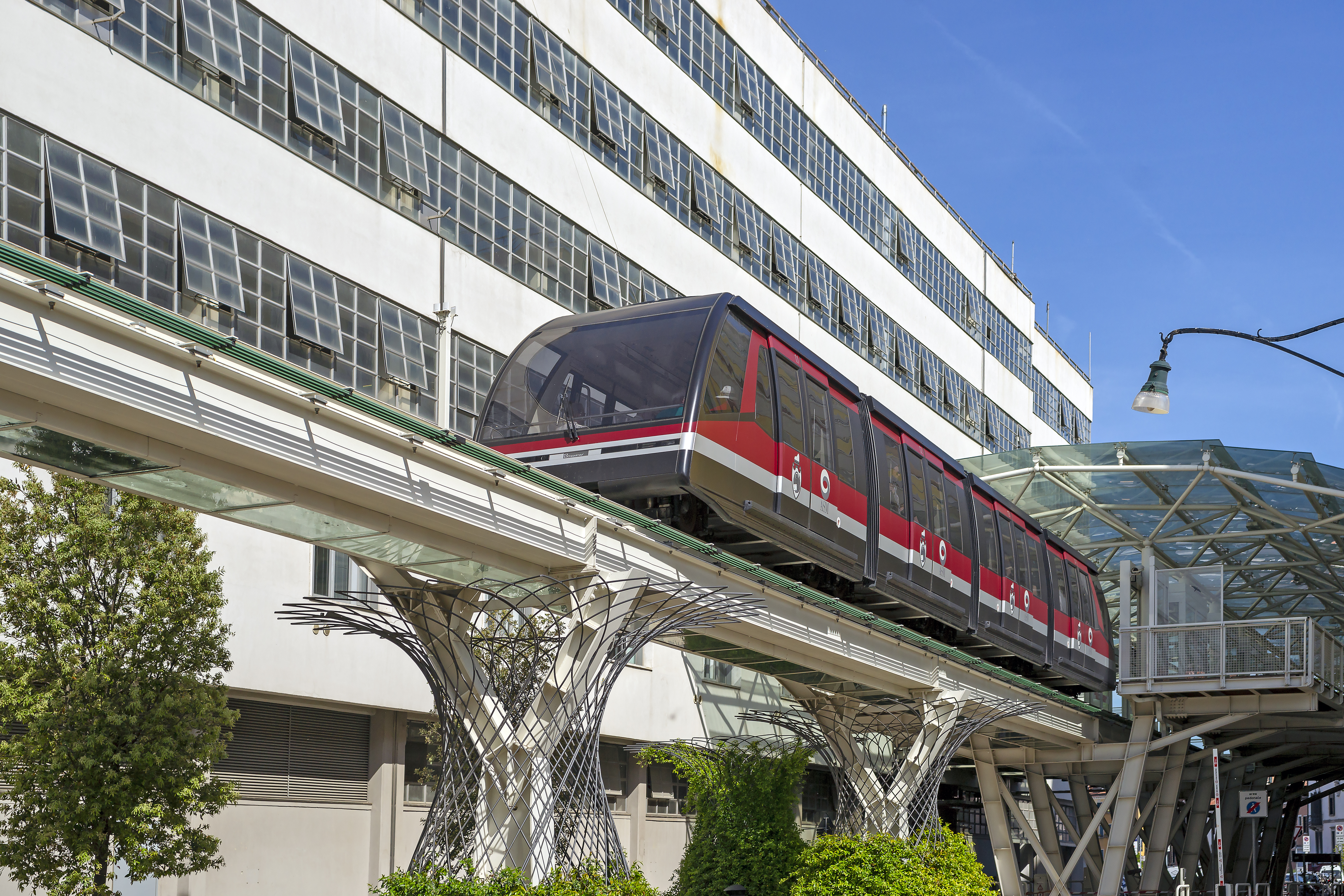

Overview
- Native name: People Mover
- Owner: Comune di Venezia
- Line number: PM
- Locale: Venice
- Termini: Tronchetto; Piazzale Roma
- Stations: 3
- Website: http://actv.avmspa.it/it/content/people-mover-0

Service
- Type: People mover
- Operator(s): Actv
- Daily ridership: 2,871 (As of July 2010)

History
- Opened: 19 April 2010

Technical
- Line length: 0.87 km (0.54 mi)
- Number of tracks: 1 (with a passing loop)
- Character: cable traction, elevated track
- Track gauge: 1,220 mm (4 ft 1/16 in)
- Operating speed: 29 km/h (18 mph)
- Maximum incline: 6.2%

The People Mover in Venice (Italian: People Mover) is an automated elevated shuttle train, which connects the Piazzale Roma—the major transportation hub of the city—and the Tronchetto island with a car parking facility. The train also makes a stop at the Marittima station where the passenger terminal of the Port of Venice is located.

Venice's People Mover is a small-scale automated guideway public transit system—a people mover.

== Description ==
The system's two four-car trains are pulled by a cable similar to a funicular, but with shallow gradients track: it reaches a maximum of 6.2% at the section crossing the Tronchetto channel, and is less than 5% over the rest of the track. Each of the two trains can accommodate 200 passengers.

The line was built by a consortium led by the Austrian company Doppelmayr Cable Car. It was the fifth Cable Liner shuttle system installed by the company.

The 870-metre-long (0.5 mi) journey takes just over three minutes, including the stop next to the cruise ship terminal. The rail gauge is 1220 mm, and the difference in altitude between terminal stations is 0.58 m.

In mid-2023, the fare was €1.50. Passengers who already have an unused ACTV land-bus ticket can validate that instead of paying the fare to ride the People Mover.

== Gallery ==
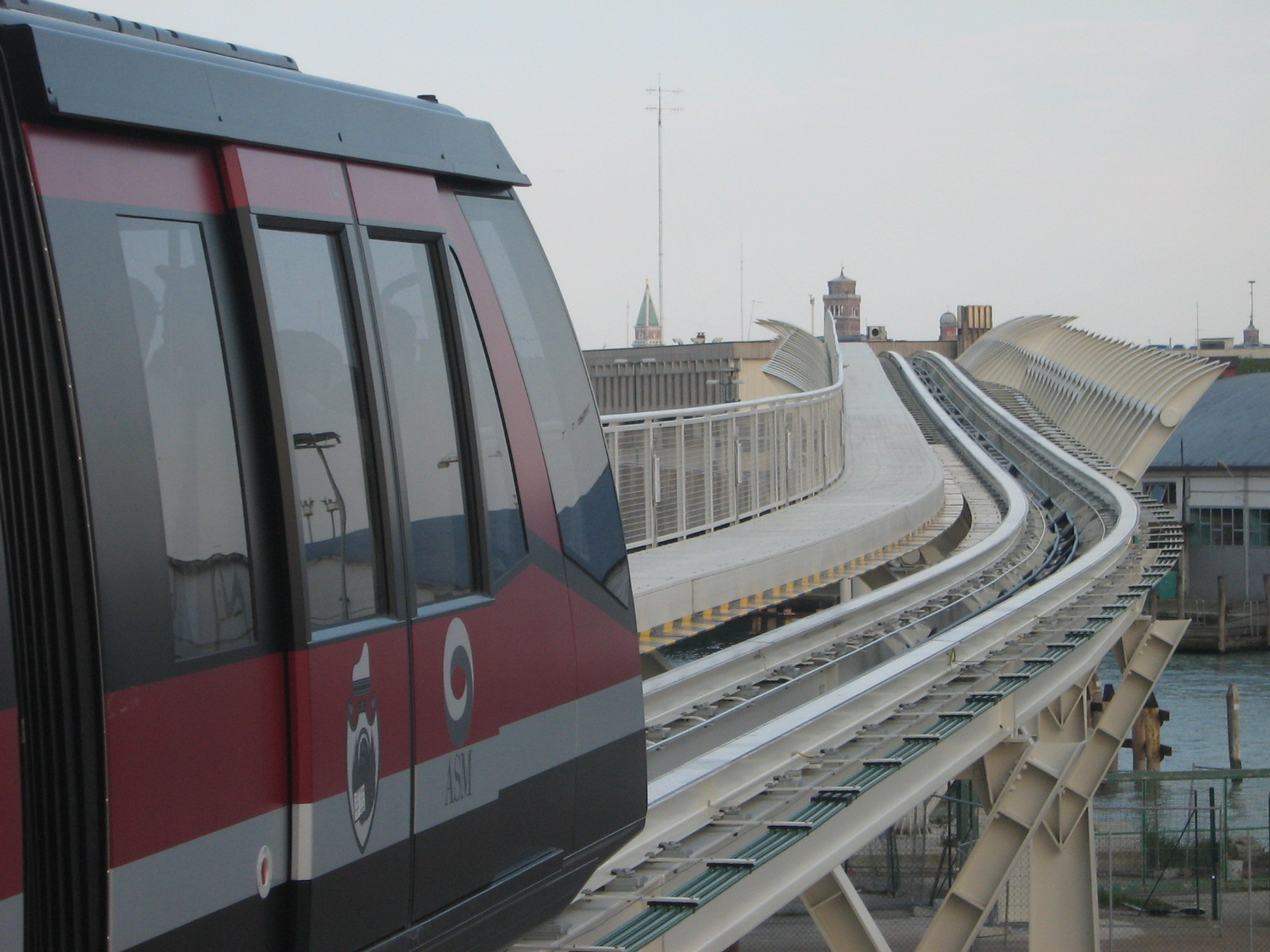
Train leaves the Tronchetto station

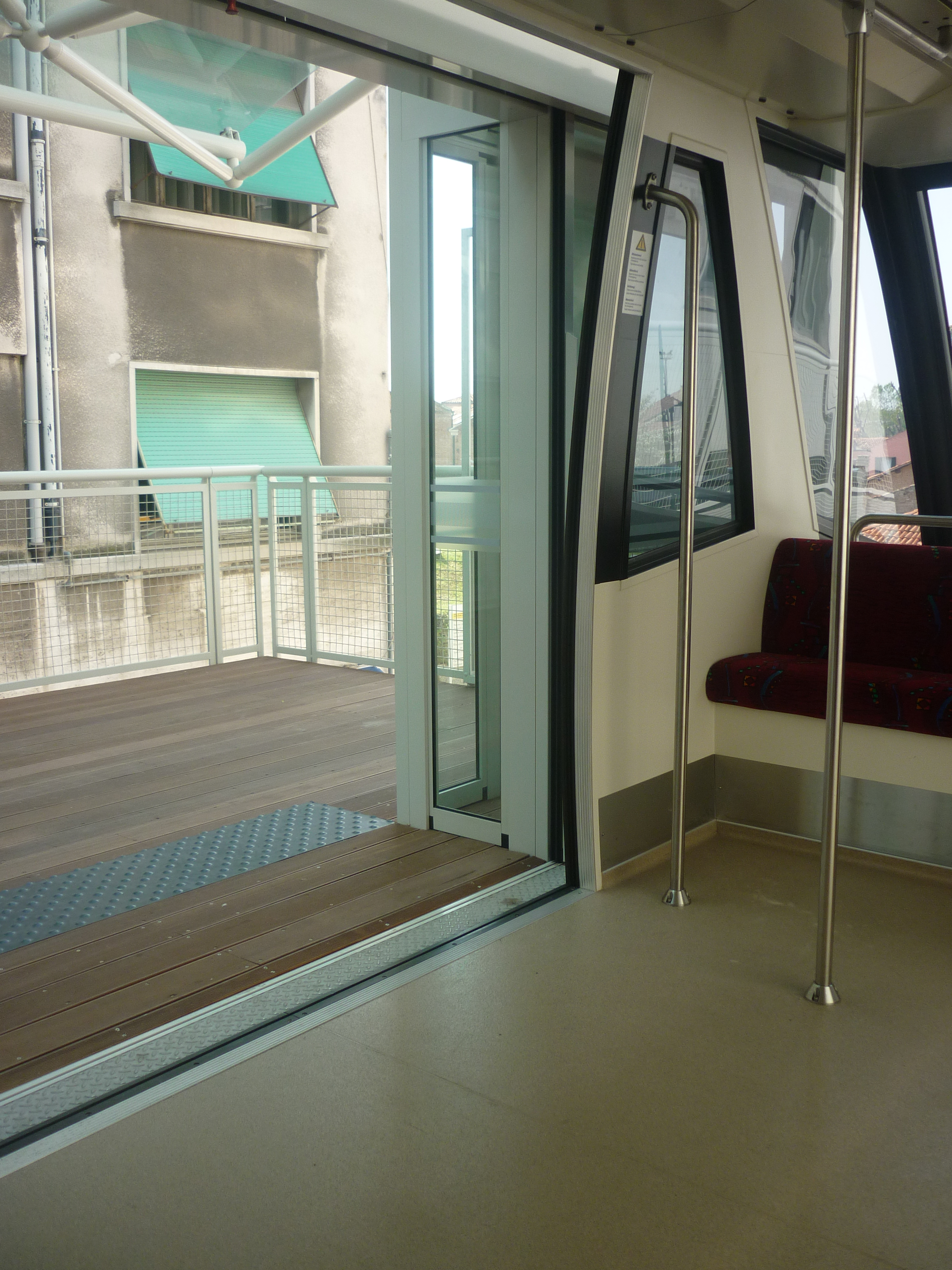
Car interior

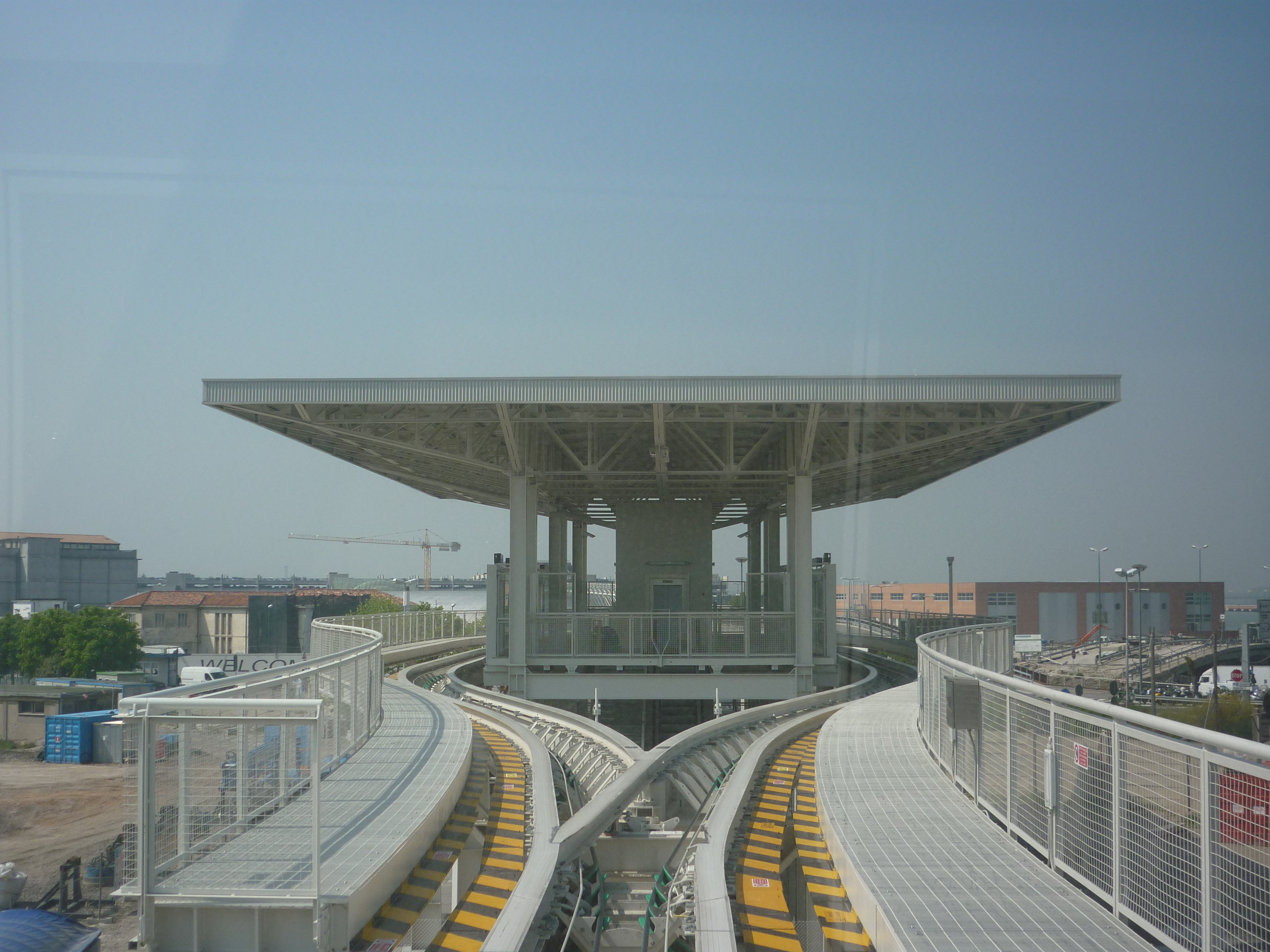
Marittima station

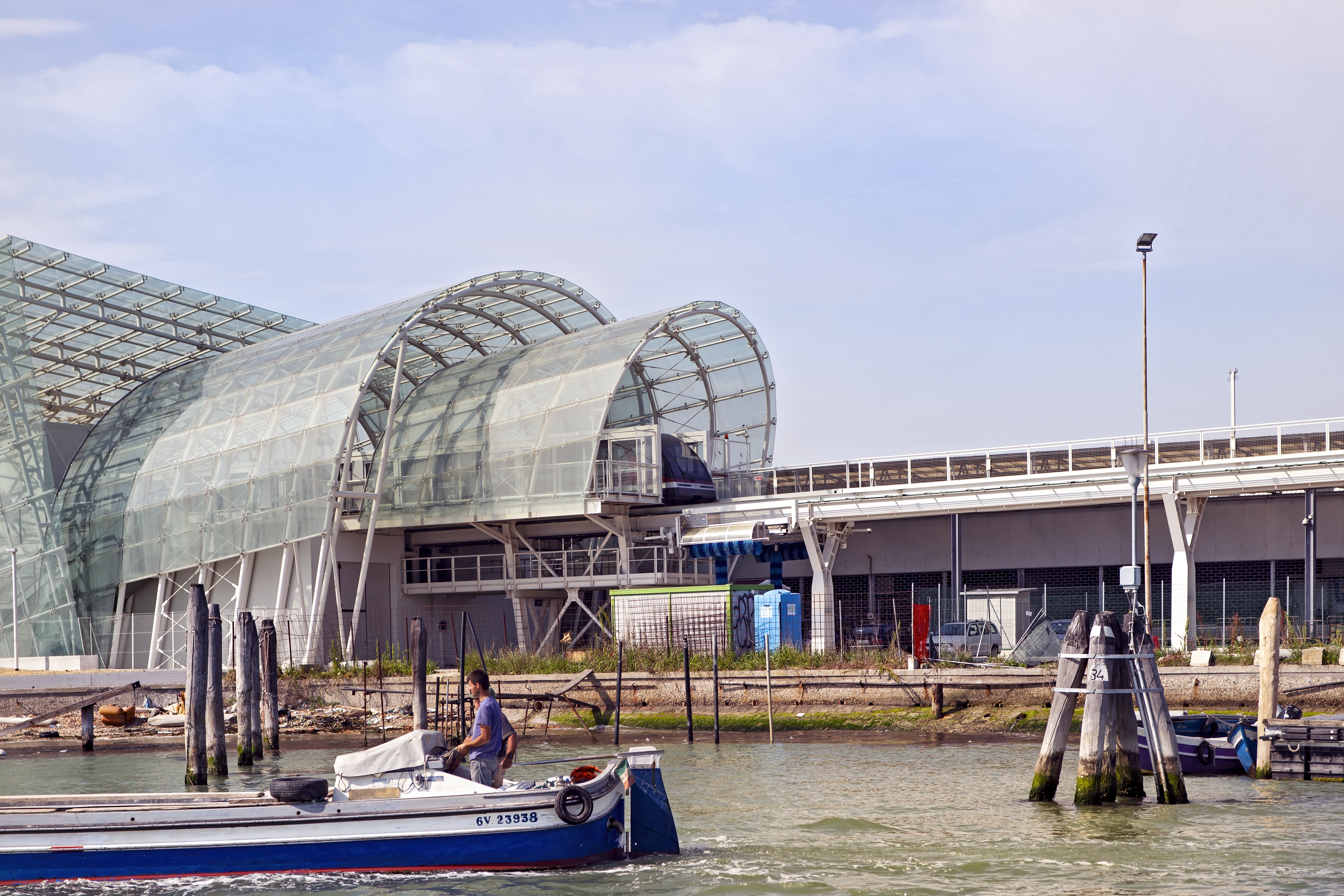
Arrival at the Tronchetto station

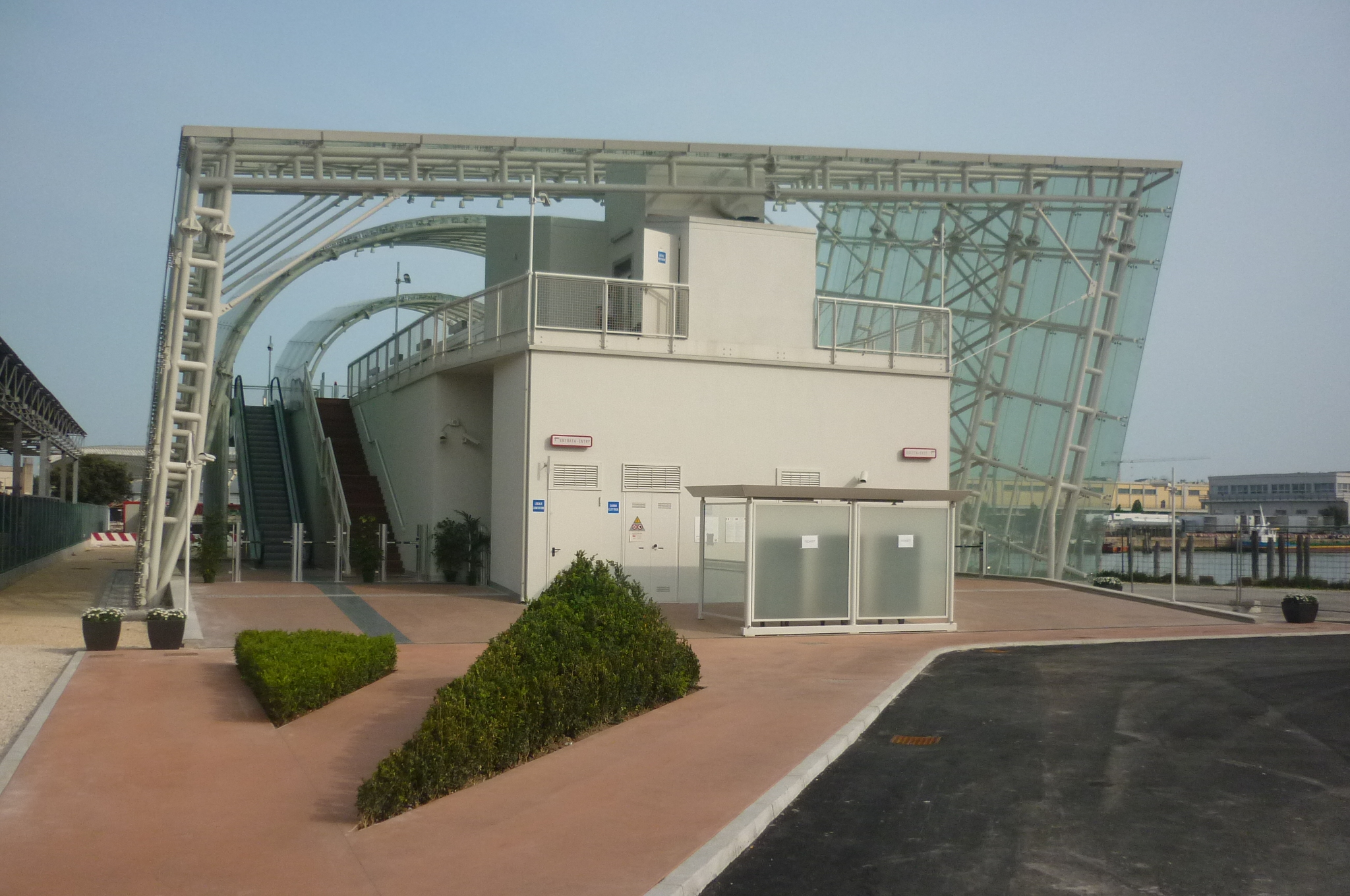
Tronchetto station

Map of the track

Video of the train leaving Tronchetto station
