= Camillo Acqua =

Italian entomologist

Camillo Acqua was an Italian entomologist, born 30 August 1863 at Velletri, Italy. He died 25 March 1936 at Ascoli Piceno.

Camillo Acqua was Directeur de l’Instituto Bacologico (Institut for sericulture) at Portici (near Naples) then at Stazione Sperimentale di Gelsicoltura e Bachicoltura ( An Experimental station for the culture of the mulberry and silkworm breeding) at Ascoli Piceno.

He wrote much on the subject of sericulture. His best known work is Il bombice del Gelso:Nello stato normale e patologico nella tecnica dell'allevamento e della riproduzione(Industria della preparazione del seme Bachi)-Enc. tela. Casa Ed. di Giuseppe Cesari.

== Sources ==
- Cesare Conci et Roberto Poggi (1996), Iconography of Italian Entomologists, with essential biographical data. Memorie della Società entomologica Italiana, 75 : 159-382.
