= Aquatic =

Aquatic means relating to water; living in or near water or taking place in water; does not include groundwater, as "aquatic" implies an environment where plants and animals live.

Aquatic(s) may also refer to:

- Aquatic animal, either vertebrate or invertebrate, which lives in water for most or all of its life
- Aquatic ecosystem, environmental system located in a body of water
- Aquatic plants, also called hydrophytic plants or hydrophytes, are plants that have adapted to living in or on aquatic environments
- Aquatic (album), 1994 album by the Australian experimental jazz trio, The Necks
- Aquatics, another name for water sports

== See also ==
- Aquatics (disambiguation)
- Freshwater ecosystem, an earth aquatic ecosystems
- Limnology, the study of inland waters
- Marine biology, the scientific study of organisms in the ocean or other marine or brackish bodies of water
- Oceanography, the study of marine environments
