= Tronchetto =

Artificial island in the Venetian lagoon

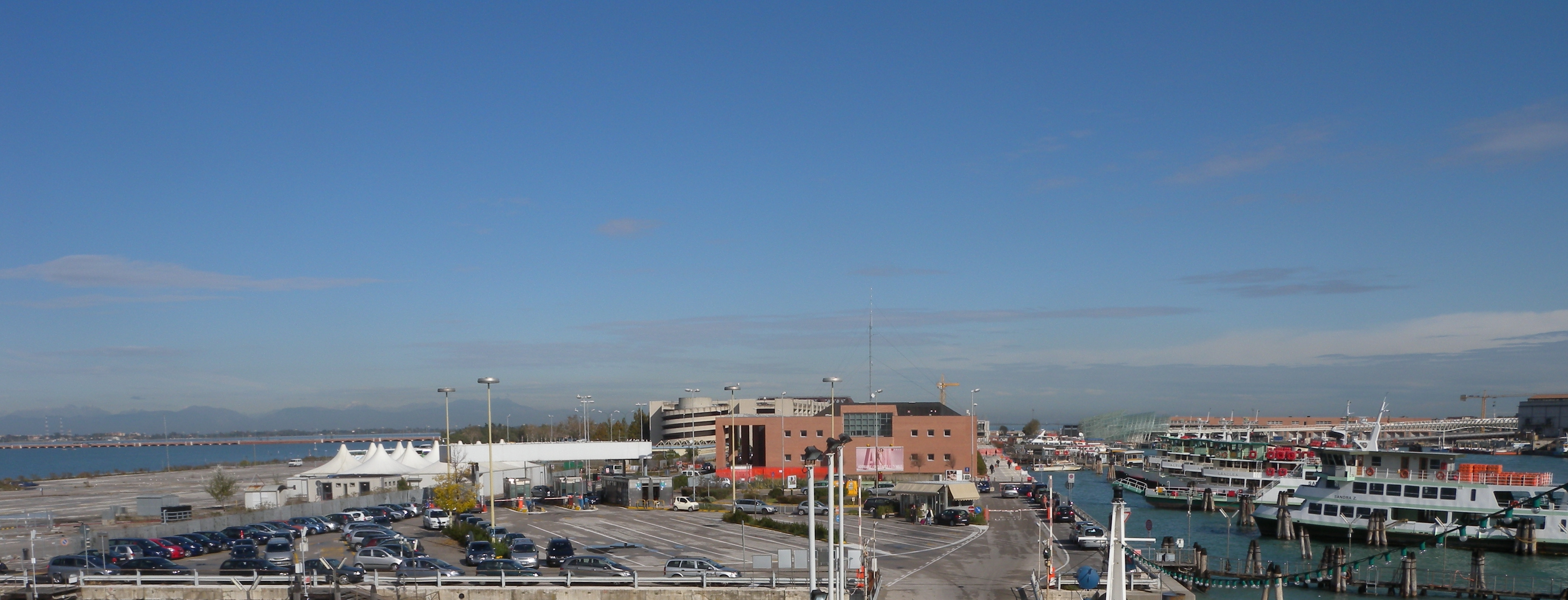
- Landing place of ferry from Tronchetto to Lido di Venezia

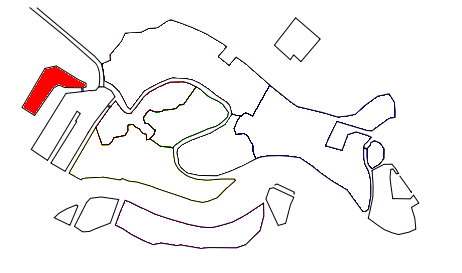

Geography
- Coordinates: 45.440556°N 12.305°E
- Adjacent to: Venetian Lagoon

Administration
- Italy
- Region: Veneto
- Province: Province of Venice

Tronchetto (also known as Isola nuova, meaning "New island") is an artificial island in the Venetian Lagoon, northern Italy, located at the westernmost tip of the main Venice island.

The island was created in the 1960s, and now is used as a car park for tourists, since vehicles cannot be driven into the city historic center. The Venice People Mover connects Tronchetto with Piazzale Roma, the main Venice bus station, which lies at the edge of the city center.

== Gallery ==
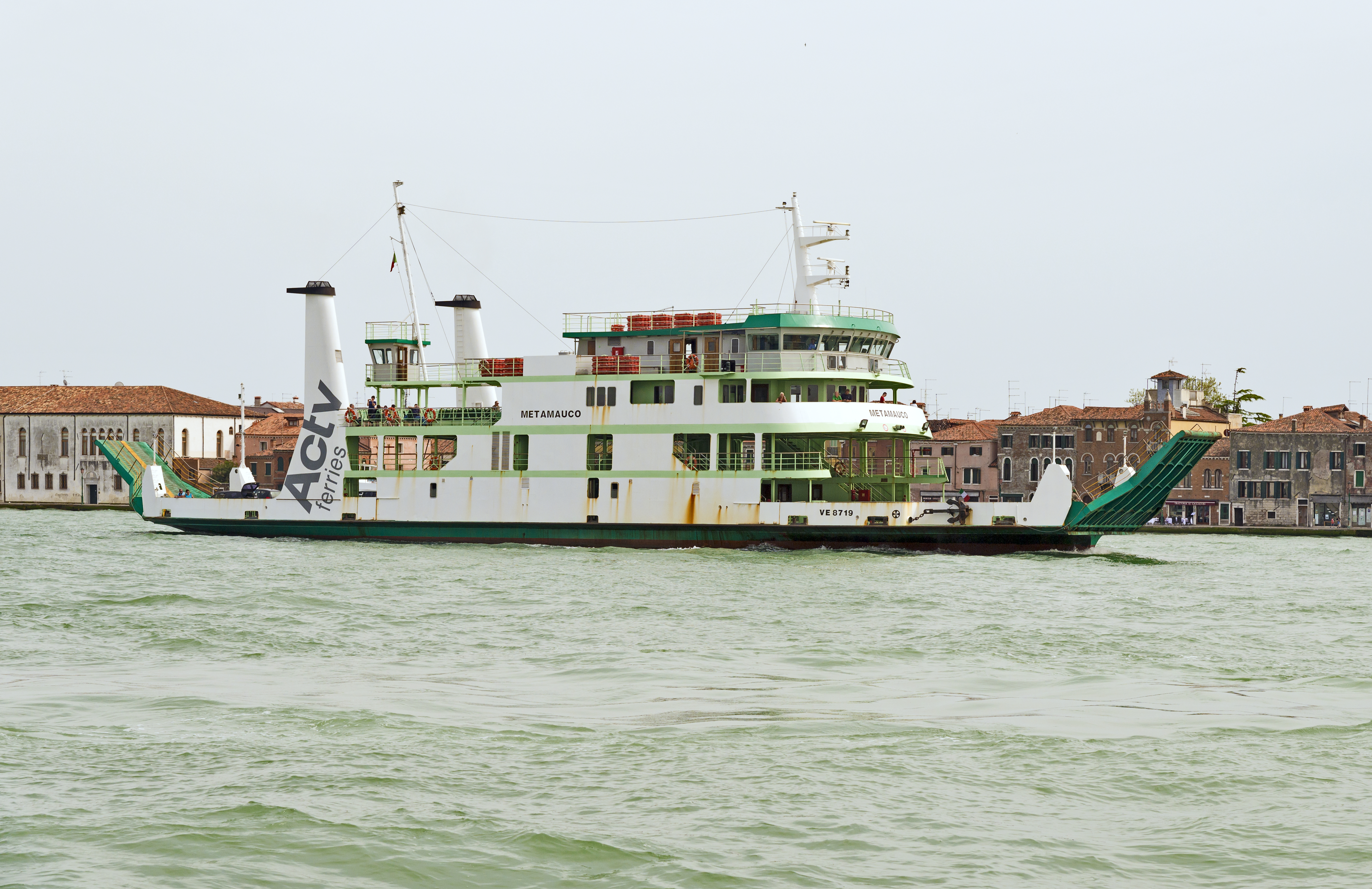
Ferry from Tronchetto to Lido di Venezia

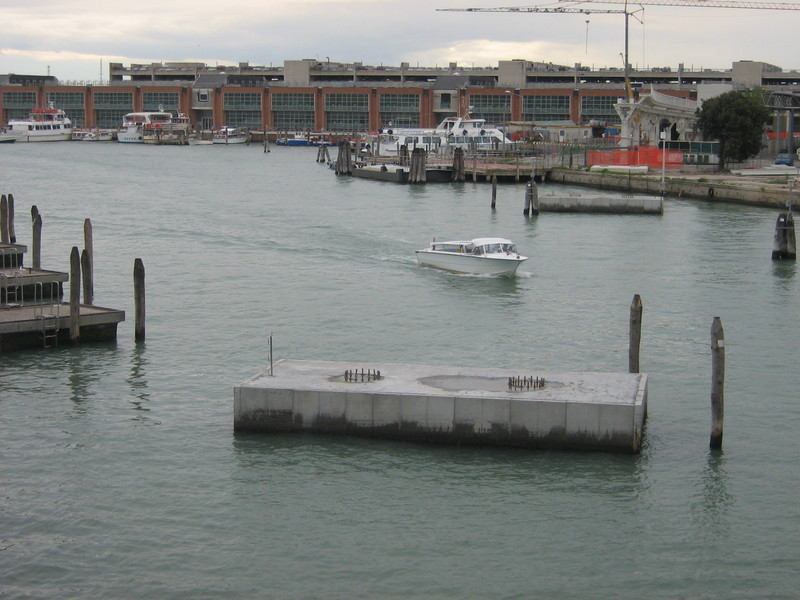
Construction of structures for the people mover in 2009

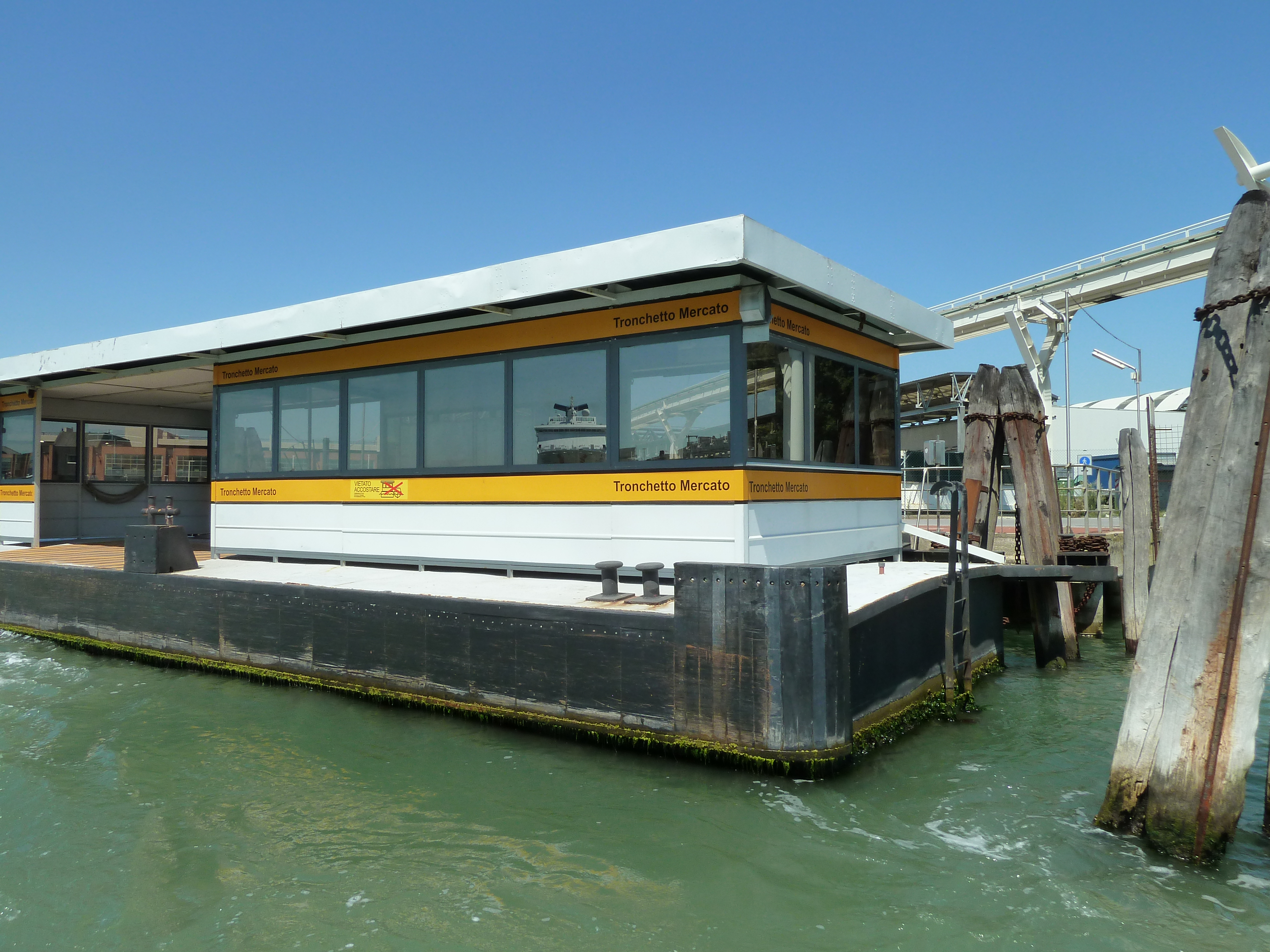
Tronchetto Market Vaporetto stop
