= Piazzale Roma =

Public space in Venice

Coordinates: 45°26′16″N 12°19′07″E

- Square and bus station
- Piasal Roma
- Location: Venice, Italy
- Interactive map of Piazzale Roma

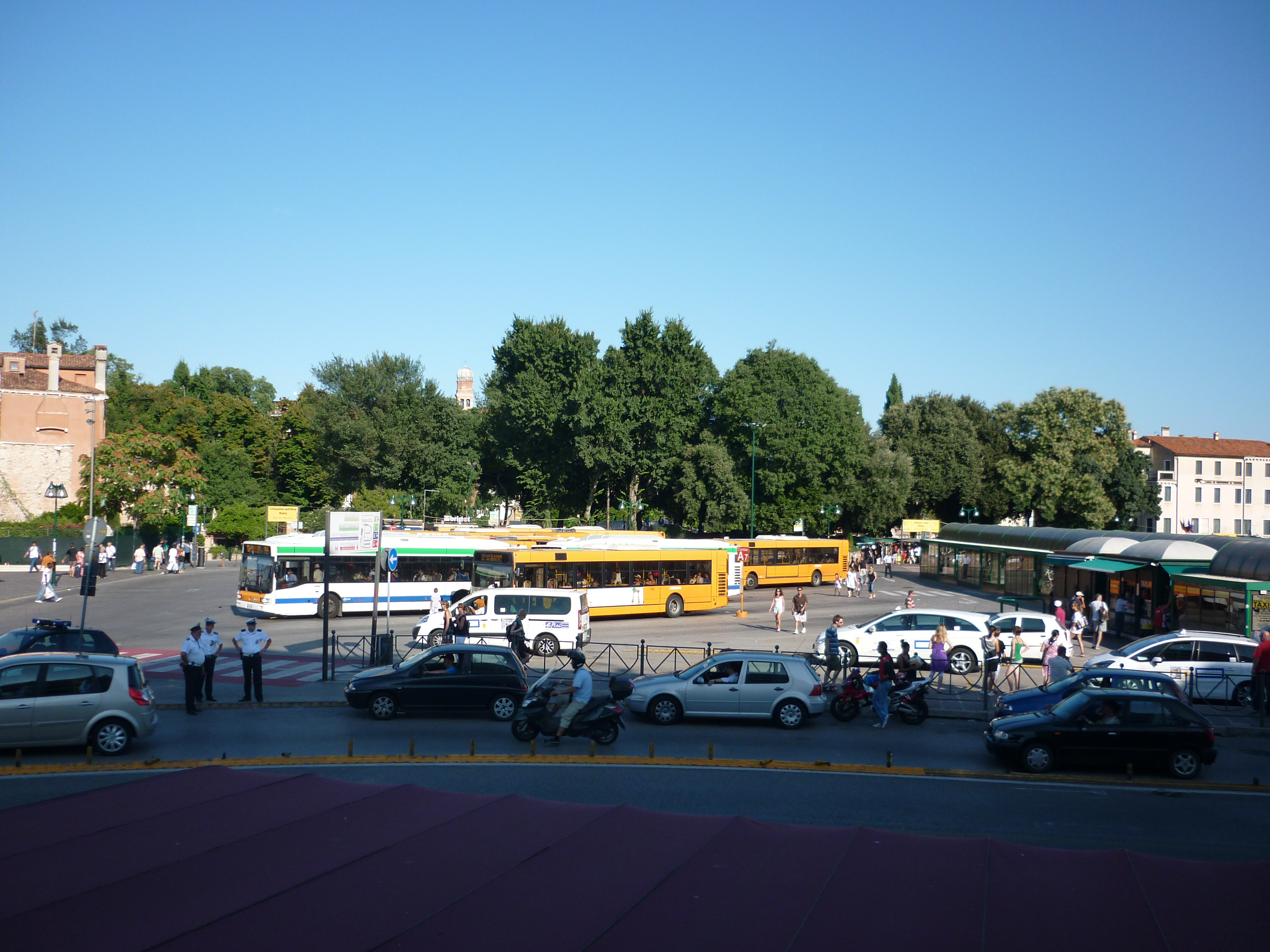
View of the Piazzale Roma

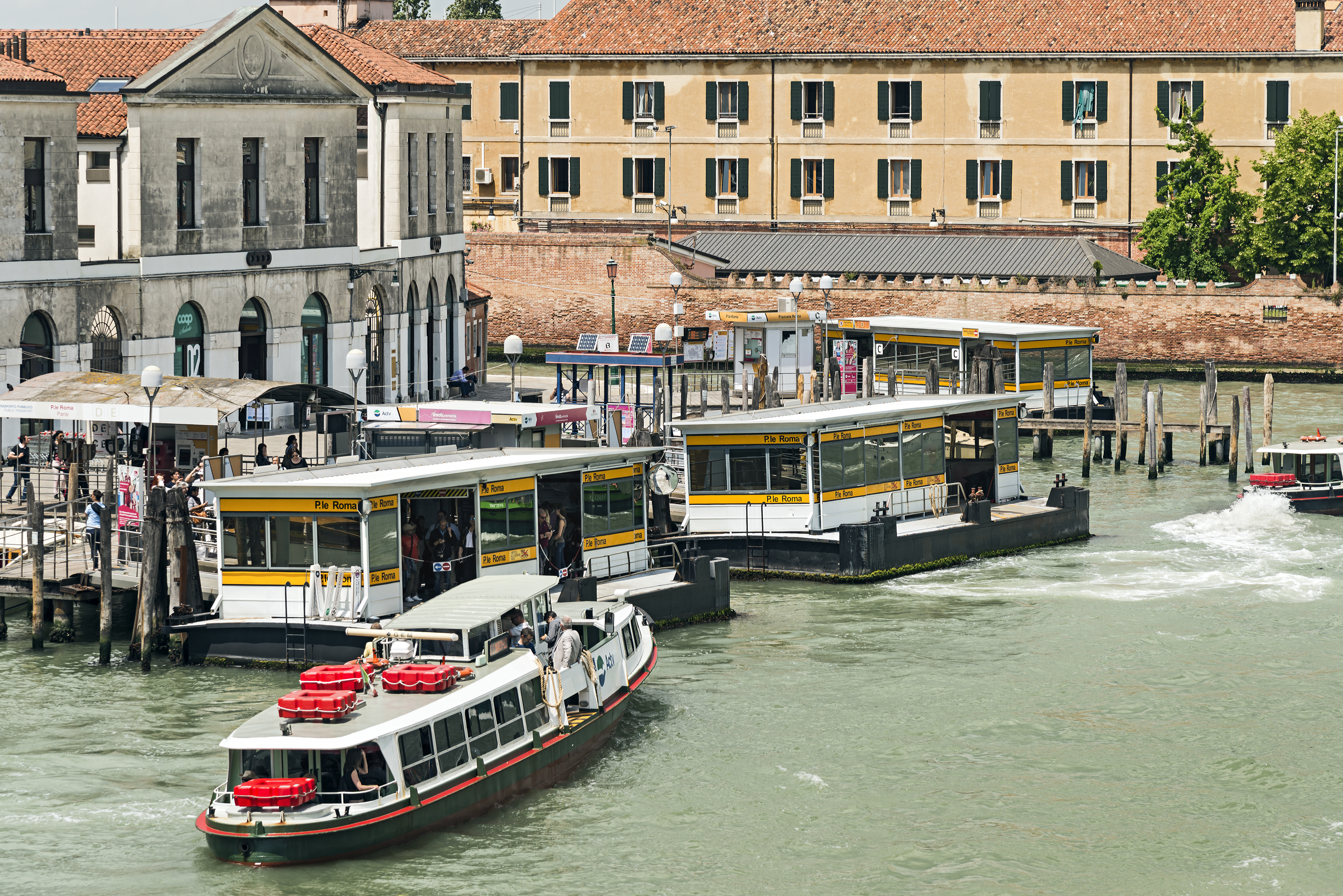
Piazzale Roma vaporetto water bus stops on the Grand Canal

Piazzale Roma (Venetian: Piasal Roma) is a square in Venice, Italy, at the entrance of the city, at the end of the Ponte della Libertà, a road bridge. The bridge connects the islands that form the historical centre of the city of Venice to the mainland part of the city. Piazzale Roma and nearby Tronchetto island are the only places in Venice's insular urban core accessible to ground motor vehicles, such as automobiles and buses.

The square acts as the main bus station for Venice. There are bus links to Venice Marco Polo Airport and Treviso Airport. The square is close to the main Santa Lucia railway station for Venice, linked by the Ponte della Costituzione, a modern footbridge installed in 2008 over the western end of the Grand Canal. The Venice People Mover, a public transit system, connects Tronchetto island and Piazzale Roma. It started operating in 2010.

== See also ==
- Piazza San Marco, the main square in Venice
