= Simone Dell'Acqua =

Italian footballer

Personal information
- Date of birth: 22 November 1989 (age 36)
- Place of birth: Milan, Italy
- Position: Winger

Team information
- Current team: GruppoBuco

Youth career
- 2004–2007: Internazinoale
- 2006–2007: → Legnano (loan)

Senior career*
Years	Team	Apps	(Gls)
2007–2010	Legnano	30	(2)
2008–2009	→ Solbiatese (loan)	12	(0)
2010–2011	Pro Patria	15	(0)
2011–2012	FeralpiSalò	6	(0)
2012	→ Lecco (loan)	6	(0)
2012–2013	Pro Patria	3	(0)
2013–2014	Santarcangelo	2	(0)
2014–	RapalloBogliasco	0	(0)
- * Club domestic league appearances and goals

Simone Dell'Acqua (born 22 November 1989) is an Italian footballer.

He mostly spent his career at Lombardy region (2004–2013) and Italian Lega Pro divisions (the third and fourth division, from 2007 to 2014).

== Biography ==
Born in Milan, capital of the Lombardy region, Dell'Acqua joined Internazionale's Allievi Regionali team (U16; B team of under-17 age group) in 2004. He scored two league goals in 2004–05 season. In the next season he was promoted to Allievi Nazionali team and also scored twice. He left for Legnano's Berretti U-20 team in 2006. In July 2007 the deal became permanent. He only played five Serie C1 games in 2007–08 season. In 2008–09 season at first he played for Solbiatese but returned to Legnano in January 2009.

Legnano was expelled from the professional league by the Commissione di Vigilanza sulle Società di Calcio Professionistiche (Co.Vi.So.C.) of FIGC as the club failed to pass certain financial and bureaucratic criteria in 2010. Dell'Acqua then left for Pro Patria and made his debut in November.

On 13 July 2011 he was signed by FeralpiSalò, rejoining former Inter team-mate Paolo Branduani.

In January 2012 he left for Lecco. On 31 July 2012 he was released by FeralpiSalò.
