= Ponte della Libertà =

Road bridge in Venice, Italy

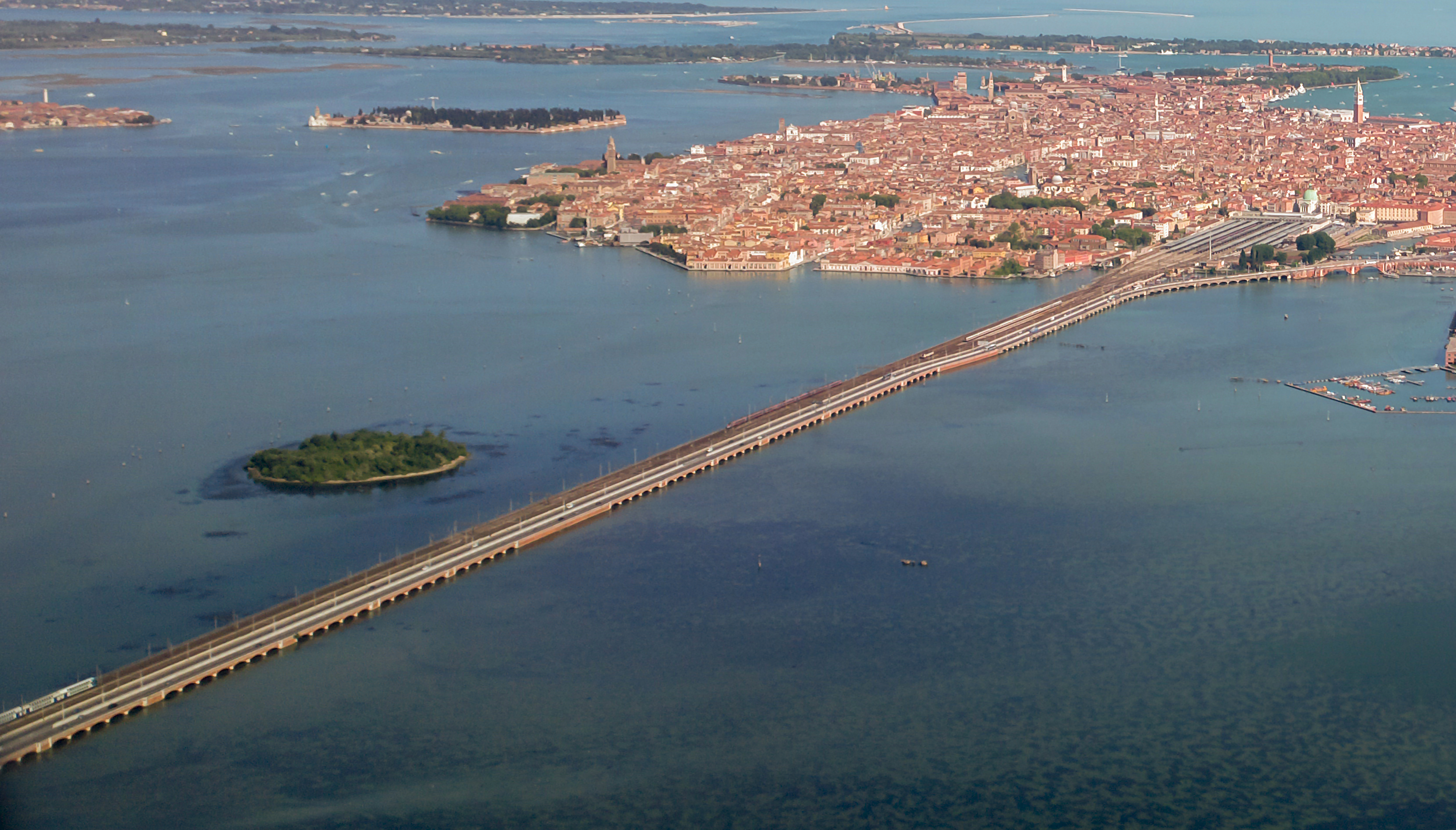
- Ponte della Libertà, looking eastward toward the historic islands
- Coordinates: 45°27′10.89″N 12°17′58.49″E
- Crosses: Venetian Lagoon
- Locale: Venice, Italy

Characteristics
- Design: Arch bridge
- Trough construction: brick; concrete
- Total length: 3,850 metres (12,630 ft; 2.39 mi)
- Width: 22 metres (72 ft)

History
- Designer: Eugenio Miozzi
- Construction start: 1931
- Construction end: 1933

Location
- Interactive map of Ponte della Libertà

The Ponte della Libertà (Liberty Bridge) is a road bridge connecting the islands that form the historical centre of the city of Venice to the mainland part of the city.

Designed in 1932 by engineer Eugenio Miozzi, it was opened by Benito Mussolini in 1933 as Ponte Littorio ("Lictor's bridge") – a name used during the Fascist era for several other Italian bridges. At the end of World War II it was renamed Ponte della Libertà to honour the end of the Fascist dictatorship and of the Nazi occupation.

The bridge is the only vehicular access to the historical centre of Venice.

- The eastern end of the road terminates in the Piazzale Roma, the bus depot for the historical centre.
- The western end reaches mainland Venice and becomes the Via Libertà, which divides the Venetian boroughs (municipalità) of Mestre (north) and Marghera (south). It is the final section of the old Public Road 11, the Padana Superiore.

It is 3.85 km (2.39 mi) long and has two lanes (but no emergency lane) with a tram track each way. There is also a pedestrian and cycle path on the southern side. It was built alongside the Venice Railway Viaduct, which had been constructed in 1846. This has two tracks each way and is still in use.

== In popular culture ==
The bridge was a major location for the White Album fight in the manga and anime JoJo's Bizarre Adventure: Golden Wind.

== See also ==
- The Causeway, Bermuda: A similar bridge in Bermuda

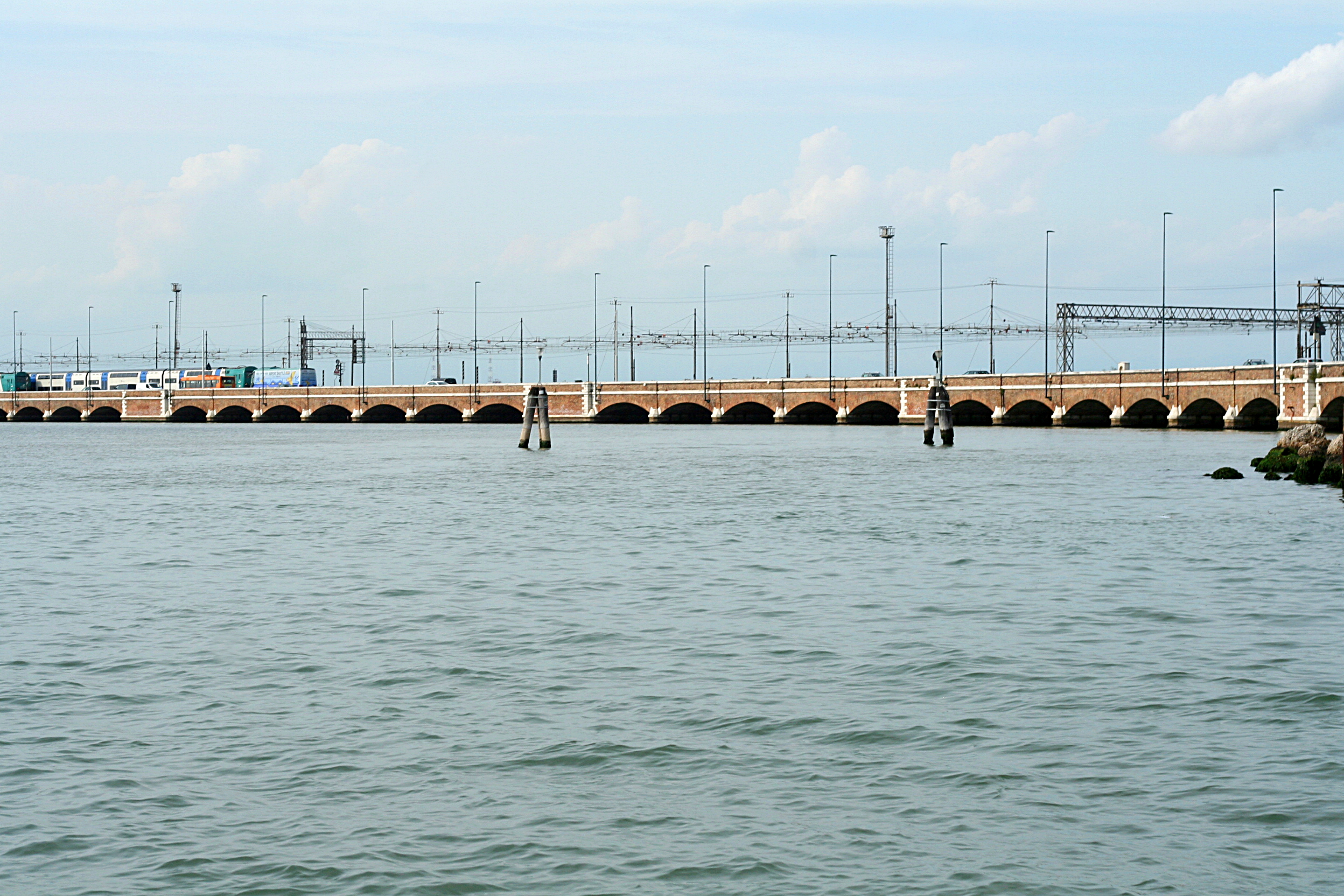
South-east side of Ponte della Libertà.
