= Acqua Limone =

Swedish clothing brand

Acqua Limone is a clothing brand from Gothenburg in Sweden, founded in 1979 by Ilse Stålblad. Their products are mainly sports oriented. It was very common in Sweden for a period in the 1990s.
