= Acqua pazza =

Acqua pazza may refer to:

- Acqua pazza (food), a dish of poached white fish and tomatoes in Italian cuisine
- Acqua pazza (wine), a type of wine made by Mezzadria peasants in Italy
