= Irreversible binomial =

Fixed phrase of two or more conventionally joined words

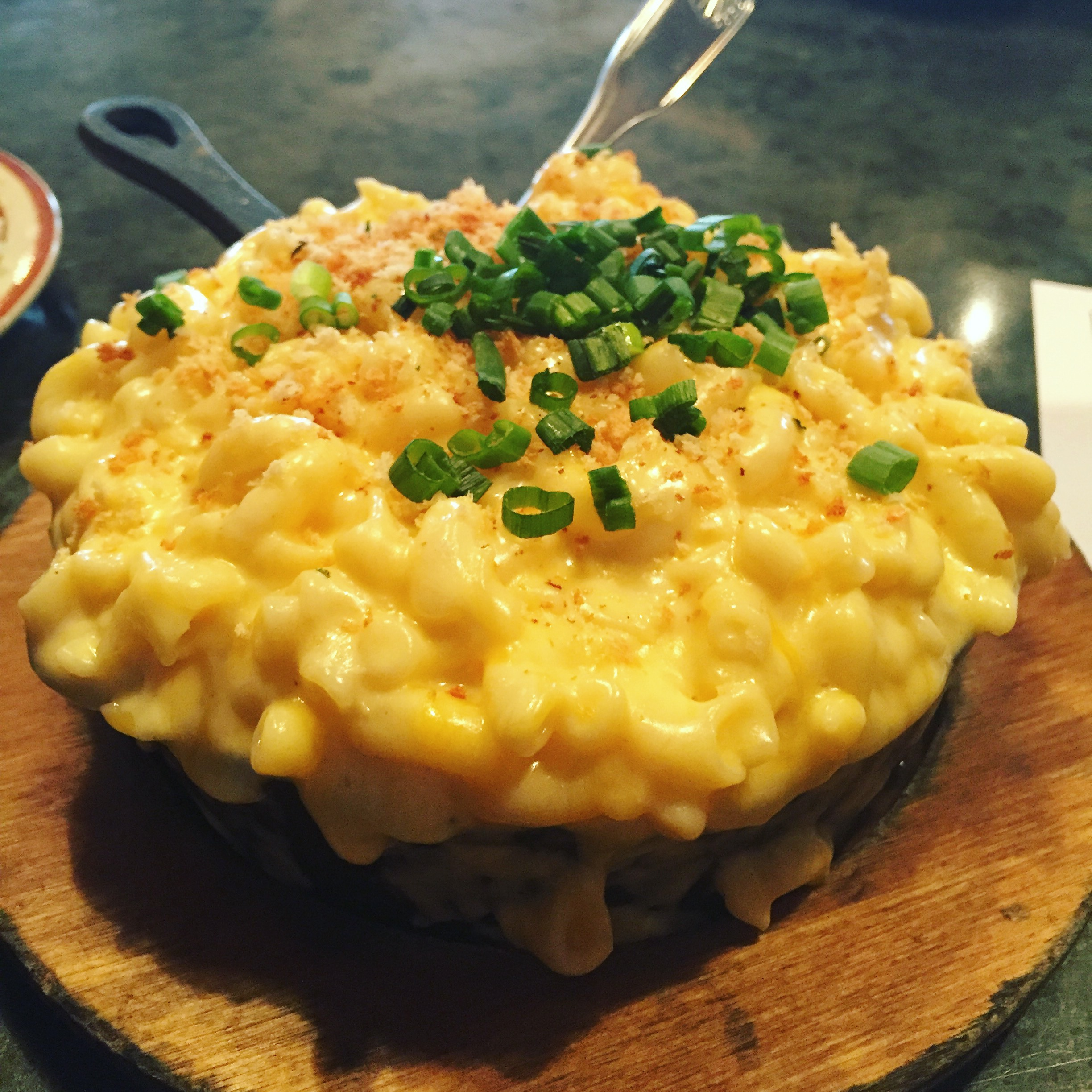
The expression "macaroni and cheese" is an example of irreversible binomial. The order of the two keywords of this familiar expression are normally not reversed.

In linguistics and stylistics, an irreversible binomial, frozen binomial, binomial freeze, binomial expression, binomial pair, or nonreversible word pair is a pair of words, used together, in fixed order, as an idiomatic expression or collocation. The words typically have a semantic relationship, usually involving the word and or or. They also belong to the same part of speech: for example: nouns (e.g., milk and honey); adjectives (short and sweet); or verbs (do or die). Usually (as with the preceding examples) the order of such word elements will not be reversed.

The term "irreversible binomial" was introduced by Yakov Malkiel in 1954, though various aspects of the phenomenon had been discussed, since at least 1903, under different names: a "terminological imbroglio". Ernest Gowers used the name Siamese twins (i.e., conjoined twins) in the 1965 edition of Fowler's Modern English Usage. The 2015 edition reverts to the scholarly name, "irreversible binomials", as "Siamese twins" had become "politically incorrect".

Many irreversible binomials are catchy due to alliteration, rhyming, or ablaut reduplication, so becoming clichés or catchphrases. Idioms like rock and roll, the birds and the bees, and collocations like mix and match, and wear and tear have particular meanings apart from or beyond those of their constituent words. Ubiquitous collocations like loud and clear and life or death are fixed expressions, making them a standard part of the vocabulary of native English speakers.

Some English words have become obsolete in general but are still found in an irreversible binomial. For example, spick is a fossil word that never appears outside the phrase spick and span. Some other words, like vim in vim and vigor or abet in aid and abet, have become rare and archaic outside the collocation.

Numerous irreversible binomials are used in legalese. Due to the use of precedent in common law, many lawyers use the same collocations found in legal documents centuries old. Many of these legal doublets contain two synonyms, often one of Old English origin and the other of Latin origin: deposes and says, ways and means.

While many irreversible binomials are literal expressions (like washer and dryer, rest and relaxation, rich and famous, savings and loan), some are entirely figurative (like come hell or high water, nip and tuck, surf and turf) or mostly so (like between a rock and a hard place, five and dime). Somewhat in between are more subtle figures of speech, synecdoches, metaphors, or hyperboles (like cat and mouse, sick and tired, barefoot and pregnant). The terms are often the targets of eggcorns, malapropisms, mondegreens, and folk etymology.

Some irreversible binomials can have minor variations without loss of understanding: time and time again is frequently shortened to time and again; a person who is tarred and feathered (verb) can be said to be covered in tar and feathers (noun).

However, in some cases small changes to wording change the meaning. The accommodating attitude of an activity's participants would be called give and take, while give or take means "approximately". Undertaking some act whether it is right or wrong excludes the insight from knowing the difference between right and wrong; each pair has a subtly differing meaning. And while five and dime is a noun phrase for a low-priced variety store, nickel and dime is a verb phrase for penny-pinching.

== Structure ==
The words in an irreversible binomial belong to the same part of speech, have some semantic relationship, and are usually connected by and or or. They are often near-synonyms or antonyms, alliterate, or rhyme.

Examples below are split into various tables; some may belong in more than one table but are listed only once.

=== With opposites and antonyms ===
- addition and subtraction
- assets and liabilities
- back and forth
- balls and strikes
- beginning to end
- black and white
- big and small
- a blessing and a curse
- boom or bust
- bride and groom
- brother and sister
- butt and pass
- buy and sell
- catch and release
- cause and effect
- church and state
- cops and robbers
- come and go
- coming and going
- cowboys and Indians
- days and nights
- deep and wide
- dos and don'ts
- ebb and flow
- fire and ice
- first and last
- floor to ceiling
- food and drink
- fore and aft
- foreign and domestic
- forward and backward
- friend or foe
- front to back
- fruits and vegetables
- give and take
- good and evil
- hail and farewell (Note: Etymologically synonyms; functionally antonyms.)
- hand and foot
- head over heels
- Heaven and Hell
- here and there
- hide and seek
- hill and dale
- him and her
- high and low
- hills and valleys
- his and hers
- hither and thither
- hither and yon
- hot and cold
- hurry up and wait
- husband and wife
- in and out
- in the (right/wrong) place at the (right/wrong) time
- ladies and gentlemen
- land and sea
- life or death
- long and short
- lost and found
- love and hate
- love and war
- man and wife
- mind over matter
- mom and pop
- naughty or nice
- near and far
- night and day (difference)
- nip and tuck
- north to south
- now and then
- now and later
- open and shut
- over and under
- park and ride
- port and starboard
- pros and cons
- push and pull
- rank and file
- rise and fall
- savings and loan
- in sickness and in health
- soap and water
- start to finish
- (from) stem to stern
- stop and go
- strike and dip
- sweet and sour
- the quick and the dead
- thick and thin
- (there's) a time and a place
- tip and ring
- to and fro
- top to bottom
- town and country
- up and down
- ups and downs
- uptown and downtown
- war and peace
- washer and dryer
- wax and wane
- weal and woe
- yes and no
- yin and yang

=== With related words and synonyms ===
- ages and generations
- aid and comfort
- alas and alack
- bits and pieces
- body and soul
- born and raised/bred
- bright and early
- brick and mortar
- by hook or by crook
- cheek by jowl
- clean and tidy
- chapter and verse
- cup and saucer
- (it was a) dark and stormy (night)
- (this) day and age
- dollars and cents
- dot the i's and cross the t's
- fear and loathing
- fish and chips
- first and foremost
- hail and farewell
- hand over fist
- haughty and high minded
- head and shoulders
- heart and soul
- herbs and spices
- highest and best (use)
- house and home
- hunger and thirst
- knife and fork
- leaps and bounds
- like mother, like daughter
- lo and behold
- neat and tidy
- nickel and dime
- nook and cranny
- null and void
- nuts and bolts
- over and done with
- pain and suffering
- peace and quiet
- pen and ink
- pick and choose
- (on) pins and needles
- plain and simple
- prim and proper
- rant and rave
- rocks and shoals
- shock and awe
- signs and wonders
- six of one,
  half a dozen of the other
- skull and bones
- skull and crossbones
- strait and narrow
- straight and narrow
- stress and strain
- swings and roundabouts
- ticks and chiggers
- whine and complain
- wind and rain
- (up) close and personal
- yea and amen

=== With alliteration ===
Also see the English section of the Reduplication article for cases like walkie-talkie, ragtag, chit-chat, hip-hop, bing-bang-boom, etc.

- bag and baggage
- baubles and beads
- beams and balance
- bed and breakfast
- belt and braces
- bench and bar
- big and bad
- the birds and the bees
- black and blue
- bold and beautiful
- bootleggers and Baptists
- boxers or briefs
- bread and butter
- bull and boar
- cash and carry
- chalk and cheese
- cliques and clans
- command and control
- cookies and cream
- deaf and dumb
- (between the) devil and the deep blue sea
- dine and dash
- down and dirty
- dribs and drabs
- drink and drive
- drunk and disorderly
- fast and furious
- feast or famine
- fire and forget
- fire and fury
- fit in or fuck off
- flip-flop
- flora and fauna
- footloose and fancy-free
- forgive and forget
- form and function
- friend or foe
- fun and frolics
- fur and feathers
- ghosts and goblins
- grins and giggles
- to have and to hold
- hearth and home
- hem and haw
- hoot and holler
- horseshoes and handgrenades
- Jew and Gentile
- juking and jiving
- king and country
- kit and caboodle
- kith and kin
- last but not least
- latitude and longitude
- life and limb
- live and learn
- lock and load
- love 'em and leave 'em
- love it or leave it
- mix and match
- meek and mild
- name and number
- part and parcel
- peas in a pod
- pen and pencil
- pen(cil) and paper
- pig in a poke
- pillar to post
- pots and pans
- publish or perish
- rags to riches
- ranting and raving
- read and write
- rest and relaxation (R&R/R'n'R)
- (without) rhyme or reason
- right and wrong
- rock and roll
- rough and ready
- rules and regulations
- safe and secure
- safe and sound
- shot and shell
- shower and shave
- signs and symptoms
- slip and slide
- spick and span
- spit and shine
- Stars and Stripes
- sticks and stones
- sugar and spice
- this or that
- tit for tat
- top and tail
- toss and turn
- trick or treat
- trials and tribulations
- tried and tested
- tried and true
- truck and trailer
- wash and wear
- watching and waiting
- weep and wail
- wet and wild
- whooping and hollering
- wild and woolly
- wise and wonderful
- witches and warlocks
- wrack and ruin

=== With rhymes and similar-sounding words ===
- a wrap and a slap
- break and take
- boom and zoom
- box and cox
- chalk and talk
- charts and darts
- chips and dip
- dive and drive
- fair and square
- fender bender
- five and dime
- flotsam and jetsam
- handy-dandy
- hanky-panky
- helter skelter
- higgledy piggledy
- high and dry
- hire and fire
- hit and split
- hit it and quit
- hither and thither
- hocus pocus
- hoity-toity
- hot to trot
- hotch-potch
- huff and puff
- hurly-burly
- hustle and bustle
- itty-bitty
- lap and gap
- latest and greatest
- lean, mean, fightin' machine (also: mean, green)
- lick 'em and stick 'em
- loud and proud
- meet and greet
- might makes right
- motor voter
- my way or the highway
- name and shame
- name it and claim it
- near and dear
- never, ever
- nitty gritty
- odds and sods
- onwards and upwards
- out and about
- out and proud
- pell-mell
- pump and dump
- rough and tough
- run and gun
- shout and clout
- saggy baggy
- shake and bake
- slowly but surely
- smoke and joke
- son of a gun
- stash and dash
- stitch and bitch
- stop and drop
- so far, so good
- surf and turf
- teeny-weeny
- time and tide
- town and gown
- use it or lose it
- wake and bake
- wear and tear
- weed and feed
- wheeling and dealing
- willy nilly
- wine and dine
- yea or nay
- (the) yeas and (the) nays

== Legal terminology ==
In law and official documents, there are many irreversible binomials and triplets consisting of near synonyms, such as the oft-heard terms and conditions and cease and desist. Legal triplets are quite common as well, such as to all intents, constructions and purposes and signed, sealed and delivered. See the Legal doublet article for a list.

=== For infractions of the law ===
- aid and abet
- breaking and entering
- drunk and disorderly

=== For legal paperwork and judicial decisions ===
- all and sundry
- arbitrary and capricious
- information and belief
- null and void
- power and authority
- true and correct
- will and testament

=== For judicial and government concepts ===
- law and order
- perform and discharge
- rules and regulations
- ways and means

== Conjunction ==
The most common conjunctions in an irreversible binomial are and or or.

=== With "and" as the conjunction ===
- above and beyond
- airs and graces
- alarm and muster
- alive and kicking
- alive and well
- an arm and a leg
- armed and dangerous
- apples and oranges
- back and fill
- back and forth
- bacon and eggs (Note: In the United Kingdom eggs and bacon is the common term.)
- bangers and mash
- bait and switch
- bait and tackle
- (old) ball and chain
- barefoot and pregnant
- bargain and sale
- bed and breakfast
- beck and call
- bells and whistles
- belt and suspenders
- big and bold
- big and tall
- bigger and better
- binge and purge
- bit and bridle
- bits and bobs
- bits and pieces
- black and blue
- block and tackle
- blood and guts
- blood and gore
- bob and weave
- bow and arrow
- bound and determined
- bound and gagged
- bow and scrape
- brace and bit
- bread and water
- bread and circuses
- bread and roses
- brown and serve
- bucket and spade
- bump and grind
- bump and run
- by and large
- by guess and by golly
- cap and gown
- car and driver
- cat and mouse
- checks and balances
- chicken and dumplings
- chop and change
- clean and sober
- cloak and dagger
- coat and tie
- coffee and doughnuts
- cock-and-bull
- come and go
- crash and burn
- cream and sugar
- crime and punishment
- cup and saucer
- cut and dried (dry)
- cut and paste
- cut and run
- dandelion and burdock
- (in this)day and age
- day and night
- dead and buried
- dead and gone
- death and taxes
- dine and dash
- divide and conquer
- dog and pony show
- down and out
- duck and cover
- duck and dive (Note: In the United Kingdom, synonymous to bob and weave in common parlance and origin from the world of boxing (i.e. pugilistic).)
- each and every
- eyes and ears
- facts and figures
- far and wide
- fast and furious
- fast and loose
- fine and dandy
- fingers and thumbs
- fire and brimstone
- first and foremost
- fish and chips
- (by) fits and starts
- flesh and blood
- flesh and bone
- forever and a day
- forever and ever
- front and center
- fun and games
- fuss and bother
- give and take
- goals and aspirations
- good and plenty
- goodness and light
- grin and bear it
- ground and pound
- hack and slash
- hale and hearty
- hard and fast
- ham and eggs
- hammer and nail
- hammer and sickle
- hammer and tongs
- hearts and minds
- (move) heaven and earth
- here and now
- hide and seek
- hide and watch
- high and mighty
- high and dry
- high and tight
- hit and miss
- hit and run
- hit it and quit it
- hither and yon
- hither and thither
- home and hosed
- home and dry
- hook and eye
- hook and loop
- hookers and blow
- horse and buggy
- horse and carriage
- hot and heavy
- hot and high
- hot and bothered
- huff and puff
- hugs and kisses (XOXO)
- if and when
- (for all) intents and purposes
- kiss and tell
- kiss and make up
- kith and kin
- knife and fork
- kicking and screaming
- lakes and streams
- last will and testament
- law and order
- lo and behold
- lock and dam
- lock and key
- locked and loaded
- look and feel
- loud and clear
- make do and mend
- man and boy
- meat and potatoes
- men and women
- milk and cookies
- milk and honey
- mortise and tenon
- movers and shakers
- name and address
- names and faces
- nice and easy
- nook and cranny
- noughts and crosses
- (every) now and then
- nuts and bolts
- odds and ends
- off and away
- once and for all
- one and done
- one and only
- out and about
- over and out
- peaches and cream
- Ps and Qs
- peanut butter and jelly
- peas and carrots
- pickles and ice cream
- pick and axe
- piss and moan
- piss and vinegar
- piss and whine
- prim and proper
- prize and booty
- pros and cons
- pork and beans
- pure and simple
- quick and dirty
- rack and pinion
- rack and ruin
- raining cats and dogs
- rape and pillage
- research and development (R&D)
- rhythm and blues (R&B)
- rich and famous
- rise and fall
- rise and shine
- (between a) rock and a hard place
- room and board
- rough and tumble
- run and jump
- (all's) said and done
- salt and pepper
- salt and vinegar
- scratch and sniff
- search and rescue
- seek and destroy
- (different) shapes and sizes
- shirt and tie
- short and fat
- short and sweet
- short and stout
- show and tell
- shuck and jive
- sick and tired
- slash and burn
- slings and arrows
- slip and fall
- slow and steady
- skin and bone(s)
- smash and grab
- smoke and mirrors
- snakes and ladders
- song and dance
- sound and fury
- (in) spirit and (in) truth
- spit and polish
- stand and deliver
- stress and strain
- Sturm und Drang
- suave and debonair
- suit and tie
- sunshine and rainbows
- supply and demand
- sweetness and light
- a swing and a miss
- sword and sandal
- tables and chairs
- tall and thin
- tar(red) and feather(ed)
- tar and feathers
- tea and crumpets
- (through) thick and thin
- thunder and lightning
- tits and ass
- to and fro
- tooth and nail
- touch and go
- track and field
- trial and error
- trials and tribulations
- tuck and roll
- twist and turn
- up and about
- up and coming
- vim and vigor
- wait and see
- warm and fuzzy
- warp and weft
- watch and ward
- wax and wane
- ways and means
- well and good
- whinge and whine
- wine and roses
- words and phrases
- X's and O's
- yes and no
- a year and a day

=== With "or" or "nor" as the conjunction ===
- all or nothing
- better or worse
- big or small
- black or white
- business or pleasure
- the chicken or the egg
- day or night
- dead or alive
- do or die
- fight or flight
- (neither) fish nor fowl
- give or take
- good or bad
- gentle or simple
- he or she
- heads or tails
- (come) hell or high water
- (neither) here nor there
- (neither) hide nor hair
- his or her
- hit or miss
- (not one) jot or tittle
- kill or cure
- kill or be killed
- (neither) love nor money
- make or break
- more or less
- now or never
- put up or shut up
- rain or shine
- rhyme or reason
- right or wrong
- sink or swim
- sooner or later
- take it or leave it
- two or more
- up or down
- (neither) use nor ornament
- victory or death
- win or lose
- yes or no

=== With no conjunction ===
- hoity toity
- hunter-gatherer
- corn cheese

== People and fictional characters ==
- Abbott and Costello
- Abraham and Isaac
- Achilles and Patroclus
- Adam and Eve
- Adorno and Horkheimer
- Alexiares and Anicetus
- Antony and Cleopatra
- Ant & Dec
- Batman and Robin
- Bonnie and Clyde
- Cain and Abel
- Cannon and Ball
- Castor and Pollux
- Cupid and Psyche
- Click and Clack
- Damon and Pythias
- David and Goliath
- Deleuze and Guattari
- Dick and Jane
- Drake & Josh
- Faust and Marguerite
- Flanders and Swann
- Fred and Rose
- French and Saunders
- Frick and Frack
- Fry and Laurie
- Gilbert and Sullivan
- Gilgamesh and Aga
- Hansel and Gretel
- Hellman & Friedman
- Jacob and Esau
- Jack and Jill
- Jack and Victor
- Jaya and Vijaya
- Jekyll & Hyde
- Laurel and Hardy
- Lennon and McCartney
- Lerner and Loewe
- Lewis and Clark
- Lilo & Stitch
- Little and Large
- Lugal-irra and Meslamta-ea
- Mario and Luigi
- Martin and Lewis
- Mary-Kate and Ashley Olsen
- Mel and Sue
- Morecambe and Wise
- Mork and Mindy
- Orpheus and Eurydice
- Ox-Head and Horse-Face
- Penn & Teller
- Phyllis and Aristotle
- Phineas and Ferb
- Pinky & The Brain
- Pygmalion and Galatea
- Ren & Stimpy
- Rhett & Link
- Rick and Morty
- Rodgers and Hart
- Rodgers and Hammerstein
- Romeo and Juliet
- Romulus and Remus
- Rosencrantz and Guildenstern
- Sam and Max
- Samson and Delilah
- Simon & Garfunkel
- Sonny & Cher
- Thelma & Louise
- Thomson and Thompson
- Tom & Jerry
- Tristan and Isolde
- Tim & Eric
- Venus and Adonis
- Vic & Bob
- Watson and Crick

== Rhyming slang ==
- Adam and Eve
- apples and pears
- bottle and glass (Note: Or more commonly just bottle, which leads on to aris from aristotle that is the rhyming slang for bottle.)
- Brahms and Liszt
- dog and bone
- frog and toad
- hand and blister
- north and south
- rabbit and pork
- trouble and strife
- two and eight
- whistle and flute

== Variants ==
Irreversible binomials are sometimes isocolons (bicolons, tricolons, etc.) which have become set phrases.

They may also be called simply binomials.

With three words, they may be called trinomials, and may satisfy the rule of three in writing.

=== Common trinomials ===
- Abraham, Isaac, and Jacob
- animal, vegetable, or mineral
- back, sack, and crack
- bacon, egg, and cheese
- beans, bullets, and bandages
- beg, borrow, or steal
- bell, book, and candle
- blood, sweat, and tears
- calm, cool, and collected
- Coffee, tea, or me?
- could've, would've, should've
- culturally, historically, or aesthetically significant
- Eagle, Globe, and Anchor
  - bird, ball, and chain (Note: Jocular variant)
- ear, nose, and throat
- eat, drink, and be merry
- fat, dumb, and happy
- Father, Son, and Holy Ghost
- fear, uncertainty, and doubt
- fraud, waste, and abuse
- friends, Romans, countrymen
- (do not) fold, spindle, or mutilate
- Get it? Got it? Good.
- gold, frankincense, and myrrh
- gold, God, and glory
- gold, silver, and bronze
- good, bad, and indifferent
- the good, the bad, and the ugly
- Guns, Germs, and Steel
- hand, foot, and mouth
- healthy, wealthy, and wise
- here, there, and everywhere
- hook, line, and sinker
- hop, skip, and a jump
- Huey, Dewey, and Louie
- I came, I saw, I conquered
- (no) ifs, ands, or buts
- judge, jury, and executioner
- lather, rinse, repeat
- left, right and center
- lie, cheat, or steal
- lies, damned lies, and statistics
- life, liberty, and property
- lights, camera, action
- lock, stock, and barrel
- mad, bad, and dangerous
- me, myself, and I
- mean, median, and mode
- name, rank, and serial number
- nasty, brutish, and short
- The Niña, the Pinta, and the Santa María
- of the people, by the people, for the people
- Past, Present, Future
- Planes, Trains, and Automobiles
- (neither) rain, nor sleet, nor snow
- reading, writing and 'rithmetic
- ready, willing, and able
- red, white, and blue
- secure, contain, protect
- sex, drugs, and rock 'n' roll
- Shadrach, Meshach, and Abednego
- Shake, Rattle, and Roll
- short and sweet and to the point
- signed, sealed, and delivered
- slips, trips, and falls
- small, medium, and large
- Snap, Crackle and Pop
- stop, drop, and roll
- stop, look, and listen
- soup, soap, and salvation
- sugar and spice and everything nice
- tall, dark, and handsome
- this, that, and the other
- tic-tac-toe
- Tom, Dick, and Harry
- the truth, the whole truth, and nothing but the truth (so help me/you God)
- up, down, and sideways
- (in no) way, shape, or form
- the way, the truth, and the life
- whats, whys, and wherefores
- win, lose, or draw
- win, place, or show
- your tired, your poor, your huddled masses

=== Quadrinomials ===
- attack, decay, sustain, release
- blood, toil, tears, and sweat
- Create, Read, Update, Delete
- Emmy, Grammy, Oscar, Tony
- John, Paul, George, and Ringo
- Matthew, Mark, Luke, and John
- north, south, east and west
- parsley, sage, rosemary, and thyme
- signed, sealed, published, and declared
- soprano, alto, tenor, bass
- spectacles, testicles, wallet, and watch
- suck, squeeze, bang, blow
- time, destiny, fate, eternity
- War, Pestilence, Famine, Death

== See also ==
- Adjective order
- Anastrophe
- Collocation
- Fossil word
- Hendiadys
- Hendiatris
- Isocolon
- Meme
- Merism
- Phraseme
- Set phrase
- Trope
- Word order

== Bibliography ==
- Cooper, William E. and Ross, John R. (1975). World order. In Robin E. Grossman et al. (Eds.), Papers from the Parasession on Functionalism, Chicago Linguistic Society, University of Chicago, Chicago, Illinois, pp. 63–111.
- Sarah Bunin Benor, Roger Levy, "The Chicken or the Egg?: A Probabilistic Analysis of English Binomials", Language 82:2:233-278 (June 2006) JSTOR 4490157 full text
- Ourania Hatzidaki, "Binomials and the Computer: a Study in Corpus-Based Phraseology", ALLC/ACH Conference, University of Glasgow, July 2000 abstract
