= Sacrifice of Isaac (disambiguation) =

The Sacrifice of Isaac refers to the Binding of Isaac, a story from the Hebrew Bible found in Genesis 22.

The Sacrifice of Isaac may also refer to:

- Sacrifice of Isaac (Andrea del Sarto), three paintings of c. 1527–1530 by Andrea del Sarto
- Abraham and Isaac (Titian), a painting of c. 1543–1544 by Titian, also called the Sacrifice of Isaac
- Sacrifice of Isaac (Caravaggio), two paintings of c. 1598–1603 by Caravaggio
- The Sacrifice of Isaac (Rembrandt), a painting of 1635 by Rembrandt
- Abraham's Sacrifice of Isaac (Bencovich), a painting of 1715 by Federico Bencovich

== See also ==
- Abraham and Isaac (disambiguation)
- Sacrifice of Abraham (disambiguation)
