= Figura =

Figura may refer to:

- Bella Figura, one act ballet by Jiří Kylián
- Fgura, town in the south of Malta
- Figura etymologica, rhetorical figure
- Figura Serpentinata, style in painting and sculpture
- Oliva figura, species of sea snail, a marine gastropod mollusk in the family Olividae (olives)
- translation of figure in some languages
- Typology, a new testament theory of interpretation of events, people and sacraments of the Hebrew bible as figurative
- Figura, a 1938 essay by Erich Auerbach

== People ==
- Anna Figura (b. 1990), Polish ski mountaineer
- Katarzyna Figura (b. 1962), Polish actress
- Paulina Figura (b. 1991), Polish ski mountaineer
- Jerzy Figura (b. 1967), Polish IT teacher
