= Tom, Dick and Harry =

Placeholder for unspecified people

The phrase "Tom, Dick and Harry" is a placeholder for unspecified people. The phrase most commonly occurs as "every Tom, Dick and Harry", meaning everyone, and "any Tom, Dick or Harry", meaning anyone, although Brewer's Dictionary of Phrase and Fable defines the term to specify "a set of nobodies; persons of no note".

Similar expressions exist in other languages of the world, using commonly used first or last names. The phrase is used in numerous works of fiction.

== Origin ==
'Tizio, Caio e Sempronio' has long been used in Italian as a placeholder for a generic set of people. The phrase originated in Bologna during the Middle Ages, where a jurist, Irnerio, wrote of 'Titius et Gaius et Sempronius', originally Latin names which morphed into the Italian. The phrase is used the same way as 'Tom, Dick and Harry' in English, or 'Pierre, Paul, Jacques' in French.

The precise origin of the phrase in English is unknown. The earliest known citation is from the 17th-century English theologian John Owen who used the phrase in 1657. Owen told a governing body at Oxford University that "our critical situation and our common interests were discussed out of journals and newspapers by every Tom, Dick and Harry." Pairs of common male names, particularly Jack and Tom, Dick and Tom, or Tom and Tib, were often used generically in Elizabethan times. For example, a variation of the phrase can be found in Shakespeare's Henry IV, Part 1 (1597): "I am sworn brother to a leash of Drawers, and can call them by their names, as Tom, Dicke, and Francis."

The phrase is a rhetorical device known as a tricolon. The most common form of tricolon in English is an ascending tricolon, and as such the names are always said in order of ascending syllable length. Other examples of this gradation include "tall, dark and handsome", "hook, line and sinker", "The Good, the Bad and the Ugly", "lock, stock and barrel"; and so on.

== In medicine ==
English-speaking medical students use the phrase in memorizing the order of an artery, and a nerve, and the three tendons of the flexor retinaculum in the lower leg: the T, D, A, N and H of Tom, Dick and Harry correspond to tibialis posterior, flexor digitorum longus, posterior tibial artery, tibial nerve, and flexor hallucis longus. This mnemonic is used to remember the order of the tendons from anterior to posterior at the level of the medial malleolus just posterior to the malleolus.

A variation of this is "Tom Dick And Very Nervous Harry". This corresponds to tibialis, digitorum, artery, vein, (tibial) nerve, hallucis.

== Cultural influences ==
Tom, Dick and Harry is widely used, so it is beyond the scope of this article to list every passing mention. However, some notable instances include:

- The three Galapagos Island tortoises brought back to England aboard HMS Beagle by Charles Darwin in 1835, as documented in his book, The Voyage of the Beagle. They were named Tom, Dick and Harry. It was later discovered that "Harry" was female, so she was renamed "Harriet" and lived in captivity in Australia until her death in 2006, aged 175 years.
- In The Black Arrow: A Tale of the Two Roses, Robert Louis Stevenson refers to a general muster as calling up Dick, Tom and Harry.

== See also ==
- Average Joe
- Joe Bloggs
- John Doe
- Joe Shmoe
- J. Random Hacker
- Alice and Bob
