= Threat or menace? =

The question "threat or menace?" is commonly used in headlines to satirize an unfair prejudice.

== Overview ==
News columnists use the phrase frequently. Examples include the Los Angeles Times, Forbes and Wired.

It may have been borrowed from the legal phrase "without threat or menace", which is one of many fixed phrases combining two synonyms, such as "let or hindrance" and "cease and desist."

Early satirical uses of "threat or menace" are in Harvard Lampoon, National Lampoon, and The Amazing Spider-Man.

A misconception is that there was an anti-drug film in the late 1950s/early 1960s called Marijuana: Threat or Menace. However this seems to actually be part of the 1999 documentary Grass—done as a satire of anti-marijuana films.

== In the Lampoon ==
In 1968 the Harvard Lampoon published a parody of Life Magazine, which included a story called "Flying Saucers: Threat or Menace".

In July 1971 the National Lampoon's cover story was "Pornography; Threat or Menace?"

== In Spider-Man ==
In the Marvel Comics universe, publisher J. Jonah Jameson frequently denounces Spider-Man in his newspaper the Daily Bugle. In The Amazing Spider-Man Annual #15, published in 1981, written by Denny O'Neil and drawn by Frank Miller, the Bugle carries the headline "Spider-Man: Threat or Menace?"
