= Floruit =

Period during which a person was active

Floruit (/ˈflɔːr.u.ɪt/ FLOR-oo-it; usually abbreviated fl. or occasionally flor.; from Latin for 'flourished') denotes a date or period during which a person was known to have been alive or active. In English, the unabbreviated word may also be used as a noun indicating the time when someone flourished.

== Etymology and use ==
Latin: flōruit is the third-person singular perfect active indicative of the Latin verb flōreō, flōrēre "to bloom, flower, or flourish", from the noun flōs, flōris, "flower".

Broadly, the term is employed in reference to the peak of activity for a person or movement. More specifically, it often is used in genealogy and historical writing when a person's birth or death dates are unknown, but some other evidence exists that indicates when they were alive. For example, if there are wills attested by John Jones in 1204 and 1229, as well as a record of his marriage in 1197, a record concerning him might be written as "John Jones (fl. 1197–1229)", even though Jones was born before 1197 and died possibly after 1229.

The term is often used in art history when dating the career of an artist. In this context, it denotes the period of the individual's known artistic activity, which would generally be after they had received their training and, for example, had begun signing work or being mentioned in contracts.

In some cases, it can be replaced by the words "active between [date] and [date]", depending on context and if space or style permits.

== See also ==
- Reign (r., Latin rexit)
- Tempore (temp.)
- Family tree
