= Polyptoton =

Stylistic device

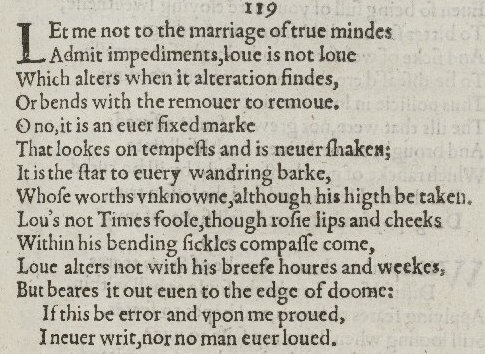
In Sonnet 116, William Shakespeare polyptotonically writes: "Love is not love / Which alters when it alteration finds, / Or bends with the remover to remove."

Polyptoton /ˌpɒlɪpˈtoʊtɒn/ is the stylistic scheme in which different words derived from the same root (such as "strong" and "strength"). The device is also referred to as paregmenon; it is sometimes synonymous with adnomination or traductio but often they are considered distinct.

An example of polyptoton is "Dull sublunary lovers' love" where the noun, "lovers," and verb, "love," (both deriving from the same root). In Ted Hughes's poem 'An Otter', the eponymous mammal is said to 'outfish fish', using the verb 'to fish' and the noun 'fish' to emphasise the otter's extreme adaptation to the water.

A related stylistic device is antanaclasis, in which the same word is repeated, but each time with a different sense. Another related term is figura etymologica.

== Definition ==
Polyptoton is the use of words derived from the same root with different inflections. Most commonly, polyptoton occurs between a noun-verb or possessive constructions.

Puttenham, in his The Arte of English Poesie, provides the following example of a polyptoton (of which he calls a traductio):

Thou weenest (Note: To hold as an opinion; suppose, believe) thy wit nought worth if other weet (Note: To know) it not
As wel as thou thy selfe, but a thing well I wot,
Who so in earnest weenes, he doth in mine aduise,
Shew himselfe witlesse, or more wittie than wise.

Puttenham reflects how this "rime this word wit is translated into weete, weene, wotte, witlesse, witty & wise"

While some definitions of polyptotons require proximity, others allow for an alternative way to use the device in which the polyptoton is developed over the course of a larger work. For example, in Frankenstein, Mary Shelley combines polyptoton with periphrastic naming (the technique of referring to someone using several indirect names). The creature in Frankenstein is referred to by many terms including "wretch," which Shelley first called the creature. Throughout the novel, various inflections of this word are used, such as "wretchedly" and "wretchedness." According to Duyfhuizen, the gradual development of polyptoton in Frankenstein is significant because it symbolizes the intricacies of one's own identity; more generally, polyptoton can be used to show development over extended periods in a work.

== Related devices ==
The following devices are typically distinguished from polyptotons but may be similar, confusing, or have overlap in definition:

=== Adnomination ===
Adnomination or adnominato is a rhetorical device, similar to a polyptoton, in which two words with different meanings sound similar. A hyponym of this device is a polyptoton (as words of the same root typically have similar sounds); another subset is a paronomasia (or a pun). For example, the phrase "He is nobody from nowhere and he knows nothing" repeats the root "no-."

=== Antanaclasis ===
Antanaclasis is a type of pun which involves the repetition of a word in two different senses; for example: "Learn a craft so that when you grow older you will not have to earn your living by craft;" note that although the word's meaning— like in a polyptoton— changes, the actual inflection of the word does not.

=== Figura etymologica ===
Figura etymologica refers to process in which words of similar etymology are brought in close syntactical connection. It is arguable whether figura etymologica includes polyptotons as some definitions include different inflections as derived from the same etymology while others do not.

== In inflected languages ==
In languages with inflection systems, such as Latin, polyptoton is the repetition of a word in different grammatical cases. For example, the Latin declension of the Roman deity Jupiter, or "Iuppiter" in various cases as follows: "Iuppiter" (nominative and vocative), "Iovem" (accusative), "Iovis" (genitive), "Iovi" (dative), and "Iove" (ablative).

Puttenham verbose translation (see above) is of the following Latin phrase: "Scire tuum nihil est nisi te scire, hoc sciat alter." This phrase roughly translates to "Your knowledge (Scire tuum) is nothing unless another knows (sciat) that you know (te scire);" note how the verb "scire" (to know) is being used in three different contexts: (1) as a noun, "knowledge;" (2) in the subjunctive, "unless others know;" (3) in the infinitive, know.

== Rhetorical use ==
As a type of repetition, polyptoton can be used for emphasis. Moreover, the change of inflections can reflect something changing state. The identical roots could also be used to connect two separate clauses or sections of the text. The following is an excerpt from Shakespeare's Sonnet 116:

Let me not to the marriage of true minds
Admit impediments. Love is not love
Which alters when it alteration finds,
Or bends with the remover to remove

Note the progression in the third line as the verb form, "alters," transitions into the noun form, "alteration;" the additionally polyptoton connects the two ideas: love altering and its alteration. There is similar contrasting and transitioning with "remover" and "remove." It is important to recognize that "Love is not love" is not an example of polyptoton and is simply a paradox.

Stylistically, polyptotons may be used to maintain rhythm, augment vividity of phrase, and increase memorability

In combination with verbal active and passive voices, it points out the idea of a latent reciprocity; an example of this is Matthew 7:1: "Judge not, that ye be not judged"

The use of polyptoton can support the language's rhythm as well as enable other rhetorical devices (such as alliteration).

== Examples ==
- "If you’re going to talk the talk, you’ve got to walk the walk'"
- "Give us this day our daily bread and forgive us our trespasses as we forgive them that trespass against us" — Matthew 6:11–12
- "Who shall watch the watchmen themselves?" (Quis custodiet ipsos custodes?) — Juvenal
- "Better often loaded than overloaded" — 37th Durham Proverb
- "Thou art of blood, joy not to make things bleed." — Sir Philip Sidney
- "The Greeks are strong, and skillful to their strength / Fierce to their skill, and to their fierceness valiant" — William Shakespeare, Troilus and Cressida, act 1, act 1
- "With eager feeding food doth choke the feeder" — Shakespeare, Richard II, act 2, scene 1
- "If it were so, it was a grievous fault, / And grievously hath Caesar answer'd it" — Shakespeare, Julius Caesar, act 3, scene 1
- "Is this a dagger that I see before me, / The handle towards my hand?" — Shakespeare, Macbeth, act 2, scene 1
- "Let me not to the marriage of true minds / Admit impediments. Love is not love / Which alters when it alteration finds, / Or bends with the remover to remove" — Shakespeare, Sonnet 116 ("Love is not love" is not polyptoton but simply a paradox)
- "Dull sublunary lovers' love" — John Donne, "A Valediction: Forbidding Mourning"
- "The greatest weakness of all weaknesses is to fear too much to appear weak." — Jacques-Bénigne Bossuet
- "But me no Buts— Be gone, Sir" — Susanna Centlivre, The Busie body
- "People complain of the despotism of princes; they ought to complain of the despotism of man. We are all born despots." — Joseph de Maistre, Against Rousseau
- "Do not listen to the reasoners; there has been too much reasoning in France, and reasoning has banished reason." — Joseph de Maistre, Considerations on France, criticizing the Cult of Reason during the French Revolution
- "Strike as I struck the foe! Strike as I would / Have struck those tyrants!" — Byron, Marino Faliero
- "Deep into that darkness peering / Long I stood there wondering, fearing / Doubting, dreaming dreams no mortal ever dared to dream before." — Edgar Allan Poe, The Raven
- "To be ignorant of one’s ignorance is the malady of the ignorant." — Amos Bronson Alcott
- "Diamond me no diamonds, prize me no prizes…" — Alfred, Lord Tennyson, Lancelot and Elaine
- "Absolute power corrupts absolutely." — Lord Acton
- "The expropriators are expropriated." — Karl Marx, Das Kapital
- "If we lose our sanity, we can but howl the lugubrious howl of idiots, the howl of the utterly lost howling their nowhereness." — D. H. Lawrence
- "It is the same with all the powerful of to-day; it is the same, for instance, with the high-placed and high-paid official. Not only is the judge not judicial, but the arbiter is not even arbitrary" — G.K. Chesterton, The Man on Top; Chesterton was known for frequently employing polyptoton to create paradox
- "So they go on in strange paradox, decided only to be undecided, resolved to be irresolute, adamant for drift, solid for fluidity, all-powerful to be impotent." — Churchill, 1936, speaking about the Chamberlain government; Churchill frequented polyptoton in many of his other speeches as well
- "Love is an irresistible desire to be irresistibly desired." — Robert Frost
- "There is no end of it, the voiceless wailing / No end to the withering of withered flowers / To the movement of pain that is painless and motionless / To the drift of the sea and the drifting wreckage / The bone’s prayer to Death its God. Only the hardly, barely prayable / Prayer of the one Annunciation." — T. S. Eliot, The Dry Salvages
- "The healthy man does not torture others—generally it is the tortured who turn into torturers." — Carl Jung
- "Not as a call to battle, though embattled we are." — John F. Kennedy, Inaugural Address, 1961
- "Please Please Me" — McCartney–Lennon
- "I am a disciple of discipline!" — David Goggins
- "The young are generally full of revolt, and are often pretty revolting about it." — Mignon McLaughlin
- "Can’t explain all the feelings that you’re making me feel." — The Darkness, I Believe in a Thing Called Love
- "What was done to me was monstrous. And they created a monster." — V in V for Vendetta
- "Secrets aren't secret. They're just hidden treasures, waiting to be exploited." — Stephen White, Dry Ice

== Genesis ==
The form is relatively common in Latin Christian poetry and prose in a construction called the superlative genitive, in phrases such as sanctum sanctorum ("holy of holies"), and found its way into languages such as Old English, which naturally preferred the prevalent alliteration that is part and parcel of polyptoton—in fact, polyptoton is "much more prevalent in Old English verse than in Latin verse." The specific superlative genitive in Old English, however, occurs only in Latinate Christian poems, not in secular poetry.

== See also ==
- Antanaclasis
- Cognate object
- Figura etymologica
- Legal doublet

== Sources ==
- Corbett, Edward P.J. Classical Rhetoric for the Modern Student. Oxford University Press, New York, 1971.
- Ward Farnsworth (2011). Farnsworth's Classical English Rhetoric. David R. Godine Publisher. pp. 63–73. ISBN 978-1-56792-385-8.
- Toswell, M. J. “Polyptoton in Old English Texts.” Early English Poetic Culture and Meter: The Influence of G. R. Russom, edited by M. J. Toswell and Lindy Brady, pp. 111–130. Medieval Institute Publications, Kalamazoo, 2016. JSTOR, www.jstor.org/stable/j.ctvvnccj.11.
