= Creative license =

Creative license can refer to

- Artistic license, also known as dramatic license
- Creative Commons licenses, a family of copyright licenses
