= Cognate (disambiguation) =

Cognate (Latin: cognatus, "related by birth") may mean:

- Cognates, words that have a common etymological origin
  - False cognates, words that appear to be cognates, but are not
  - Cognate object, a verb's object that is etymologically related to the verb
- Cognate (kinship), person who shares a common ancestor
- Cognate linkage, a kinematic linkage that generates the same coupler curve as another linkage of a different geometry
- Cognate interaction, in immunology denotes the specific, contact-dependent interaction between two cells.

== See also ==
- Connation, in plants, the fusion of organs of the same type
