= Parisosis =

In rhetoric, parisosis occurs when clauses have very similar lengths, as measured by syllables. It is sometimes taken as equivalent to isocolon.

An example of parisosis is: I came, I saw, I conquered.
