= Eschatocol =

Final section of a legal or public document

An eschatocol, or closing protocol, is the final section of a legal or public document, which may include a formulaic sentence of appreciation; the attestation of those responsible for the document, which may be the author, writer, countersigner, principal parties involved, and witnesses to the enactment or the subscription; or both. It also expresses the context of the documentation of the action described therein, i. e., enunciation of the means of validation and indication of who is responsible to document the act; and the final formulae.

Common in European medieval charters, they have been relegated to notarial acts, governmental acts, diplomatic treaties, certificates, and other formal documents.

== Contents ==
Eschatocols usually contain a:

- Clause of corroboration that expresses the specific means by which the document is to be or was validated and guaranteed as to its authenticity, which means may be a:
  - Jurat, i.e., the oath of witnesses that the contents of the document were sworn to and that the witnesses witnessed its signing;
  - Testimonium clause expressing the identities of the signatories and the time and place at which they signed it, e.g., "Sworn to and subscribed before me this 8th day of October, 2009, in the City of Dayton";
  - Attestation clause attesting to the subscription on the document of a signature of attestation, e.g., "THUS DONE AND SIGNED ...";
  - Self-proof clause, typically present only in wills and consisting of affidavits of the testator and the witnesses that the document was duly executed, which affidavits permit the will to be legally proven without further testimony as to its authenticity;
- Dating clause that expresses the time and place of execution by means of stating the:
  - Venue, also denominated the "topical date", i.e., the location of the signing of the document; and
  - (Chronological) date, i.e., the day, month, and year of the signing of the document;
- Subscription, i.e., the signature block, specifically an:
  - Attestation clause bearing the signature of the party, witness, or authenticator; and the
  - Qualification of signature, being a description of the function or office that the signatory exercised in so signing.

In notarial writings, the eschatocol is specifically a long form of notarial authentication, i.e., the notarization proper, and takes the form of the final clause of acts in public form or of the certificate at the end of acts in private form, typically to certify the document for use in foreign states. The words of an eschatocol are very formulaic and vary depending on the nature of the notarial act. At least in English, much of what was previously several sentences is often condensed into one.

== Examples ==
For acts in public form, typical eschatocols read as follows:

- "THUS DONE AND PASSED in the City of (city) aforesaid on the day, month, and year first above written and in the presence of the Witnesses who have hereunto subscribed their names with said Appearer before me, Notary, after due reading of the whole." (Louisiana, United States)
- "THUS DONE, READ AND SIGNED before me, Notary, in the City and State aforesaid on the day of the date hereinabove set forth." (Louisiana, United States)
- "Thus done and signed at (city) on the (day) day of (month) in the year (year) in the presence of the undersigned witnesses." (South Africa)
- "THUS THE APPEARERS STATE AND DECLARE and after I, Notary, had read over the instrument which I did with tacit agreement of the appearers, the latter ratified the contents hereof, as to all of which certify on this (ordinal day) day of (month) (year)." (England, United Kingdom)
- "Thus done, declared, and protested in due form of law, at the office of me, the said notary, at (location), the day and year first before written." (England, United Kingdom)
- "Thus done and protested, in the city of San Francisco, this fifth day of May, in the year of our Lord one thousand eight hundred and fifty-nine. In testimony whereof, as well as said appearers, as I, the said notary, have subscribed these presents, and I have also caused my seal of office to be hereunto affixed, the day and year last above written." (San Francisco, California, United States)
- In testimony whereof, I, John Tyler, PRESIDENT OF THE UNITED STATES OF AMERICA, have caused these Letters to be made PATENT, and the SEAL of the GENERAL LAND OFFICE to be hereunto affixed. Given under my hand, at the CITY OF WASHINGTON, the third day of March in the year of Lord one thousand eight hundred forty three and of the INDEPENDENCE OF THE UNITED STATES the sixty-seventh. (Washington, D.C., United States)
- "Thus done and passed at London aforesaid in the presence of Captain John Tailor of London, merchant, and Mr. Nicholas Corsellis also of London, merchant, as witnesses hereunto required. In Testimony of which, I, the Notary aforesaid, have hereunto set my hand and seal of office this 15th day of November, One thousand seven hundred and thirty nine." (London, England, United Kingdom)

For those in private form, the following are typical:

- “IN WITNESS WHEREOF these presents are subscribed [executed] as follows: (and narrate who when and where the execution took place [Scotland, UK]
- "IN FAITH AND TESTIMONY WHEREOF, I have hereto set and subscribed my name and affixed my seal of office at London this (ordinal day) day of (month), (year)." (London, England, United Kingdom)
- "IN TESTIMONY WHEREOF, I have hereunto subscribed my name and affixed my seal Notarial at Ottawa this (ordinal day) day of (month), (year)." (Ottawa, Canada)
- "SWORN TO AND SUBSCRIBED before me, the undersigned authority, this (ordinal day) day of (month), (year). IN WITNESS WHEREOF, I have hereunto set my hand and official seal."
- "Sworn before me, a solicitor/commissioner for oaths, on this (number) day of (month) (year), and I know the deponent. (Ireland)

== See also ==
- Act (document)
- Diplomatics
- Formulary (model documents)
- Treaty
- Constitution
- Preamble
