= Bad boy archetype =

Stock character; a roguish macho

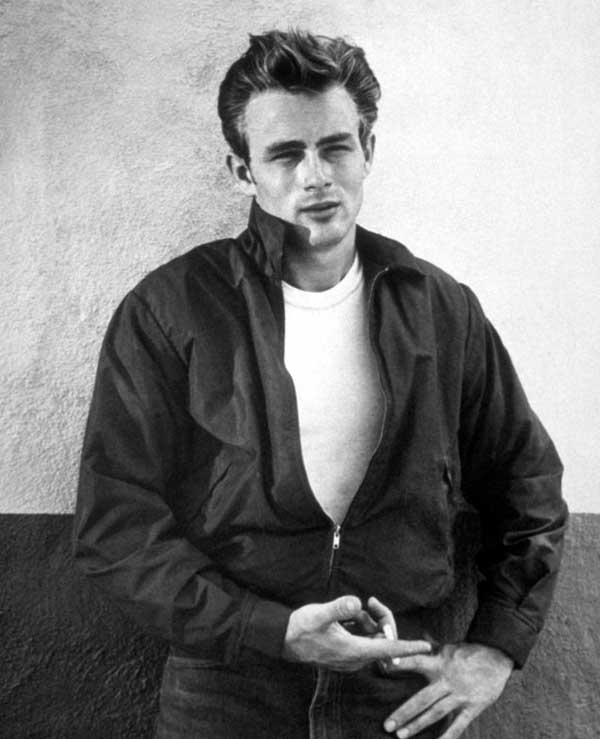
James Dean's character in Rebel Without a Cause

The bad boy is a cultural archetype that is variously defined and often used synonymously with the historic terms rake or cad: a male who behaves badly, especially within societal norms.

In films and other narratives, a bad boy is a type of antihero, sometimes a trickster. Such characters reject authority and traditional moral standards, following their own unique code of ethics that can unsettle those around them. Despite their often questionable or near-criminal habits, they are frequently depicted in a way that makes them relatable or even likable. "Bad boys typically bring a lot of fire, defiance and eroticism to the story, along with a sense of danger".

Bad boy characters came to the fore with the counterculture of the 1960s. An influential example is Paul Newman's character in Cool Hand Luke (1967). Jim Stark, James Dean's character in Rebel Without a Cause, is also considered an example of the bad boy archetype, although he has a strong moral compass beneath the rebellion.

An article in The Independent compared "bad boys" with men who had a particular combination of personality traits, sometimes referred to as the "dark triad", and reported that a study found that such men were likely to have a greater number of sexual affairs.

When having a criminal connotation, the "bad boys" archetype was popularized by the American TV show Cops, which premiered in 1989 using the song "Bad Boys" by Inner Circle as its opening theme. In the U.S., the criminal "bad boys" archetype may be more likely to be placed on Black and Hispanic youth and men.

== See also ==
- Black sheep
- Boy next door (stock character)
- Chad (slang)
- Dark triad
- Hybristophilia
- Juvenile delinquency
- Nice guy
- Playboy (lifestyle)
- Tall, dark and handsome
- Toxic masculinity
