= Sticks and Stones =

Nursery rhyme

"Sticks and Stones" is an English-language children's rhyme. The rhyme is used as a defense against name-calling and verbal bullying, intended to increase resiliency, avoid physical retaliation, and/or to remain calm and indifferent. The full rhyme is usually a variant of:

Sticks and stones may break my bones
But words will never hurt me.

The first three words of the rhyme are an example of an irreversible binomial.

== Earliest appearances ==
Alexander William Kinglake in his Eothen (written 1830, published in London, John Ollivier, 1844) used "golden sticks and stones".

An article by F.R. Horner in Liverpool's Northern Times on July 23, 1857, included the phrase (as quoted text):

Sticks and stones (says the schoolboy’s rhyme) may break men’s bones, but bad names will not hurt me.

An article in The Coleraine Chronicle and North of Ireland Advertiser on January 18, 1862 included the phrase (also as quoted text):

Sticks and stones break one’s bones, but names will never hurt one.

It appeared in The Christian Recorder, a publication of the African Methodist Episcopal Church, on March 22, 1862, where it was presented as an "old adage" in this form:

Sticks and stones will break my bones, but words will never harm me.

In a speech given by E.H. Heywood in Boston, Massachusetts, on November 16, 1862, published in The Liberator on January 2, 1863, the speaker quotes a "little Irish girl" who "dissolved the quarrel" of a group of children who were about to come to blows by saying:

Sticks and stones may break my bones, But names can never hurt me.

An article in The Tiverton Gazette and East Devon Herald on March 13, 1866, references "the old school rhyme":

Sticks and stones will break our bones But calling names, wont hurt us.

The phrase also appeared in 1872, where it is presented as advice in Tappy's Chicks: and Other Links Between Nature and Human Nature, by Mrs. George Cupples. The version used in that work runs:

Sticks and stones may break my bones But names will never harm me.

== In popular music ==
"Sticks and Stones" has been used as the title for many albums and songs, and the rhyme's lyrics have also appeared in many songs, either in its usual form or with altered lyrics.

A version was featured in the Who's 1981 song, "The Quiet One", in which the vocals were performed by bassist John Entwistle, where he mentioned this term from another source he picked up and sang this term twice where he changed "your" from the first set to "my" in the second set.

Sticks and stones may break my bones
But names will never down you

Another version was featured in the Divine Comedy's 2004 song "Sticks and Stones" from the album Absent Friends, in which the vocals were performed by Neil Hannon.

Sticks and stones may break my body
But words can tear me apart

A version was featured in American rapper and singer Juice WRLD's song "Hurt Me" from the album Goodbye & Good Riddance.

Sticks and stones may break my bones
But the drugs won't hurt me

A version was featured in American singer-songwriter Madonna's song "Like It or Not" from the album Confessions on a Dance Floor.

Sticks and stones may break my bones
But your names will never hurt

A version was featured in Pete Doherty's rock band Babyshambles's song "Sticks and Stones" from the album Down in Albion.

Sticks and stones may break my bones
Oh but your words they really hurt me

A version was featured in the Pierces's song "Sticks and Stones" from their 2007 album Thirteen Tales of Love and Revenge.

Sticks and stones will break your bones
And leave you lying in the mud
But you get scared when we're alone
Like I might suck your blood

Tom Waits uses the quote in his song "On The Nickel"

Sticks and stones will break my bones
But I always will be true
And when your mama is dead and gone
I'll sing this lullaby just for you

A variation was employed in English alternative rock band The Sundays' song "Hideous Towns" from their album Reading, Writing and Arithmetic.

And sticks and stones may break my bones
But words will just finish me off, yeah, near enough

Joyner Lucas used the same phrase of words as a song title on his recent album "Not Now I'm Busy"

Other songs which have used or interpolated the rhyme include "Titanium" by David Guetta, "S&M" by Rihanna, "Fireball" by Pitbull, "Part of Me" by Katy Perry, "You Need to Calm Down" by Taylor Swift, "Pocketful of Sunshine" by Natasha Bedingfield, and "What About Us" by Pink.

== Trivia ==
- Sirach 28:17 apparently makes a diametrically opposite statement: "The blow of a whip raises a welt, but a blow of the tongue crushes the bones." (RSV)

== See also ==
- Psychological Resilience
