= Abraham and Isaac =

Abraham and Isaac may refer to:

- Binding of Isaac, a story in the Abrahamic religions in which God orders Abraham to sacrifice his son Isaac
- The Brome play of Abraham and Isaac, a fifteenth-century play of unknown authorship
- Abraham and Isaac (Goodman play), a 1935 drama by Paul Goodman
- Abraham and Isaac (Titian), a c. 1544 painting by Titian
- Abraham and Isaac (Stravinsky), a 1963 sacred ballad for baritone and orchestra by Igor Stravinsky
- Abraham and Isaac, a 1952 musical composition by Benjamin Britten, included among his Five Canticles (Canticle II)

== See also ==
- Sacrifice of Abraham (disambiguation)
- Sacrifice of Isaac (disambiguation)
