= S&M (song) =

2011 single by Rihanna

Single by Rihanna

from the album Loud
- Released: January 23, 2011
- Recorded: 2010
- Studio: Roc the Mic (New York City); Westlake Recording (Los Angeles); The Bunker (Paris)
- Genre: Eurodance; hi-NRG
- Length: 4:03
- Label: Def Jam; SRP
- Songwriters: Mikkel S. Eriksen; Tor Erik Hermansen; Sandy Wilhelm; Esther Dean; Britney Spears (remix only)
- Producers: Stargate; Sandy Vee

Rihanna singles chronology
"All of the Lights" (2010)	"S&M" (2011)	"Man Down" (2011)

Britney Spears singles chronology
"Till the World Ends" (2011)	"S&M" (remix) (2011)	"I Wanna Go" (2011)

Music video
- "S&M" on YouTube

"S&M" is a song by the Barbadian singer Rihanna from her fifth album Loud (2010). The song was released on January 23, 2011, as the fourth single from the album. American songwriter Ester Dean wrote "S&M" in collaboration with the producers Stargate and Sandy Vee. Backed by bass beats, a keyboard and guitars, it is an uptempo Hi-NRG and Eurodance track with lyrics about sexual intercourse, sadomasochism, bondage, and fetishes.

Critical response to "S&M" was mixed; some critics praised its sound and composition, while others criticized its overtly sexual lyrics. After it reached number 2 on the US Billboard Hot 100 chart, a remix featuring Britney Spears was released. When combined with sales of the solo version, it became Rihanna's tenth and Spears' fifth number 1 single on the chart. It has been certified sextuple Platinum by the Recording Industry Association of America (RIAA) and in Australia. "S&M" peaked at number 1 in six other countries while peaking within the top ten in twenty-two additional countries.

To promote "S&M", Rihanna performed a shortened version at the 2011 Brit Awards and sang the remix with Spears at the 2011 Billboard Music Awards. Melina Matsoukas directed the song's music video, which was, in part, Rihanna's response to disparaging critics. It portrays softcore sadomasochist acts and fetishes. The music video was banned in many countries and restricted to nighttime television in others. Critics complimented Rihanna's sensuality and the vibrant colors. Photographer David LaChapelle filed a lawsuit alleging that the video incorporates ideas from his photographs. Rihanna settled the case for an undisclosed sum of money.

== Concept and development ==
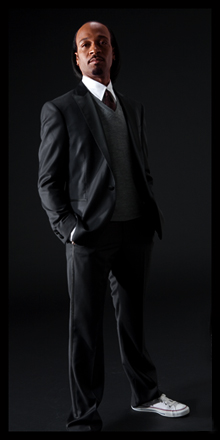
Rihanna's vocals on "S&M" were recorded and produced by Kuk Harrell.

"S&M" was written by Ester Dean in collaboration with the song's producers, Stargate and Sandy Vee. Dean explained its conception and the sexually suggestive lyrics to Gail Mitchell of Billboard: "The first thing that came to me was 'Come on, come on.' I'm thinking, 'I don't know what in the hell this is about to be.' And I remembered I'd seen something that said, 'Sticks and stones may break my bones.' Then came 'But chains and whips excite me.' When people have a great track that speaks to me, it feels like it already has a story in it". Dean states that she originally wrote the song for Britney Spears. Rihanna told Rolling Stone about her interest in bondage and other sadomasochism activities, themes central to "S&M": "I like to take charge, but I love to be submissive ... being submissive in the bedroom is really fun. You get to be a little lady, to have somebody be macho and in charge."

"S&M" was recorded during Rihanna's Last Girl on Earth tour: the instrumental parts for the song were recorded by Eriksen and Miles Walker at Roc the Mic Studios in New York City and the Westlake Recording Studios in Los Angeles, and by Vee at The Bunker Studios in Paris. Rihanna's vocals were recorded by Kuk Harrell and were produced by Harrell, Josh Gudwin and Marcos Tovar; Bobby Campbell assisted in the singer's vocal recording. Veronika Bozeman provided additional vocal production. The song was mixed by Vee at The Bunker Studios and by Phil Tan at The Ninja Beat Club in Atlanta, Georgia; additional and assistant engineering was carried out by Damien Lewis. All instrumental production was completed by Eriksen, Hermansen and Vee.

== Composition and lyrical interpretation ==
"S&M" is an uptempo hi-NRG-Eurodance song that lasts four minutes and three seconds. The song is composed in the key of E-flat minor using common time and a moderate dance tempo of 128 beats per minute. Instrumentation is provided by synthesizers, a keyboard and a guitar. Chris Ryan of MTV described the song as a "steady-rocking dance track, with ominous, snarling keyboard sounds."

During the track, Rihanna's vocal range spans one octave, from the low note of B♭_{3} to the high note of D♭_{5}. Proposing illicit acts, she uses a "sexually aggressive tone" in her vocal performance. The lyrics are about sex, sadomasochism, bondage and BDSM fetishes, including the sexual fantasies and turn-ons of its protagonist. The song opens with the hook, "Na, na, na, c'mon". During the chorus the lyrics include, "'Cause I may be bad, but I'm perfectly good at it / Sex in the air, I don't care, I love the smell of it." The post-chorus features an interpolation from The Cure's 1982 song "Let's Go to Bed". In the song, Rihanna describes herself as "bad" and openly praises her own sexual prowess; lyrics include, "Sticks and stones may break my bones / But chains and whips excite me." Rihanna told Spin magazine that the lyrics are metaphoric. She said that she thought the song was mainly about having confidence in one's identity, and about being impervious to rumors and criticism. According to Jake Conway of Q Magazine at Yale, the lyrics are guilty of "divesting sex of emotion" and re-envisaging violence as fetish; he went on to say that Rihanna pays homage to the sexual acts in an empowered dance and club mood. Chris Ryan described the song as being about "dirty, naughty, illicit bedroom activities".

== Release and remixes ==
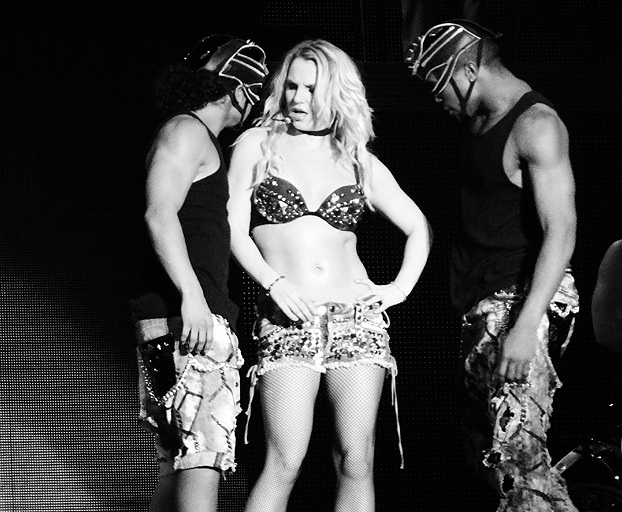
Britney Spears performing the remix of "S&M" on the Femme Fatale Tour in 2011

"S&M" was the fourth single from the album Loud to be released in the US and the third in other countries. It was sent to contemporary hit and rhythmic radio stations in the US on January 23, 2011, and to urban playlists on February 27, 2011. The single was released on iTunes Stores throughout Europe and South America on February 11, 2011. In Argentina, Brazil and certain territories throughout Europe, the song was released as an extended play (EP) on February 18, 2011; this consisted of the single version of "S&M" and two remixes by Audé and Samson. On February 28, 2011, a compilation was released worldwide as a digital package consisting of remixes by disc jockeys Audé, Samson and Joe Bermudez. "S&M" was released as a CD single in Germany on March 18, 2011. On April 11, 2011, the remix single featuring Britney Spears was made available to download worldwide. In the United Kingdom, "S&M" was deemed too explicit for daytime airplay; it was edited to remove references to sex, chains and whips, and was renamed "Come On" for BBC Radio 1.

A remix of "S&M" featuring rapper J. Cole was released on the internet on January 17, 2011. After the release of the song's album version, Rihanna asked her followers on Twitter about potential collaborators, of which Spears was the most popular choice. Twitter messages between the two artists caused speculation that they had recorded a remix of the song. The remix, featuring guest vocals and a verse written by Spears, was released on April 11, 2011. (Note: Spears' new lines are similar to the original lyrics: "Just one night full of sin/ Feel the pain on your skin/ Tough, I don't scream 'mercy'/ It's your turn to hurt me/ If I'm bad, tie me down/ Shut me up, gag and bound me/ 'Cuz the pain is my pleasure/ Nothing comes better".)

== Critical reception ==
"S&M" received mixed responses from music critics. Sal Cinquemani of Slant Magazine described "S&M" as an ode to sadomasochism that compares to Janet Jackson's The Velvet Rope. Conner felt that "S&M", as well as other Loud tracks "What's My Name?" and "Skin", were songs which allowed Rihanna to boast about how good she is in certain situations, as she did on Rated R. He chose the lyrics "I may be bad/ but I'm perfectly good at it... Chains and whips excite me" as an example of her vaunt. USA Today's Steve Jones opined that "Loud's pulsating opener, 'S&M,' makes it clear from the jump where [Rihanna is] headed as she acknowledges that 'chains and whips excite [her]'", while Leah Greenblatt of Entertainment Weekly called "S&M" an "explicitly carnal opener" with "late-night-Cinemax naughtiness".

Digital Spy's Nick Levine gave the song a rating of four stars out of five, and wrote that the song makes the listener as "up-for it" as Rihanna herself; he went on to say that "S&M" consists of "ear-frotting" hooks, synths and pounding beats. James Skinner of BBC Music wrote that Loud lacked the "chart-friendly moments" of Rated R and criticized the overtly sexual lyrics which he found "at odds with" the flirtatious appeal for which Rihanna was aiming. Skinner described the singer's vocal delivery as "forced" and criticized her for not projecting a "daring" or convincing sound on "S&M".

== Chart performance ==
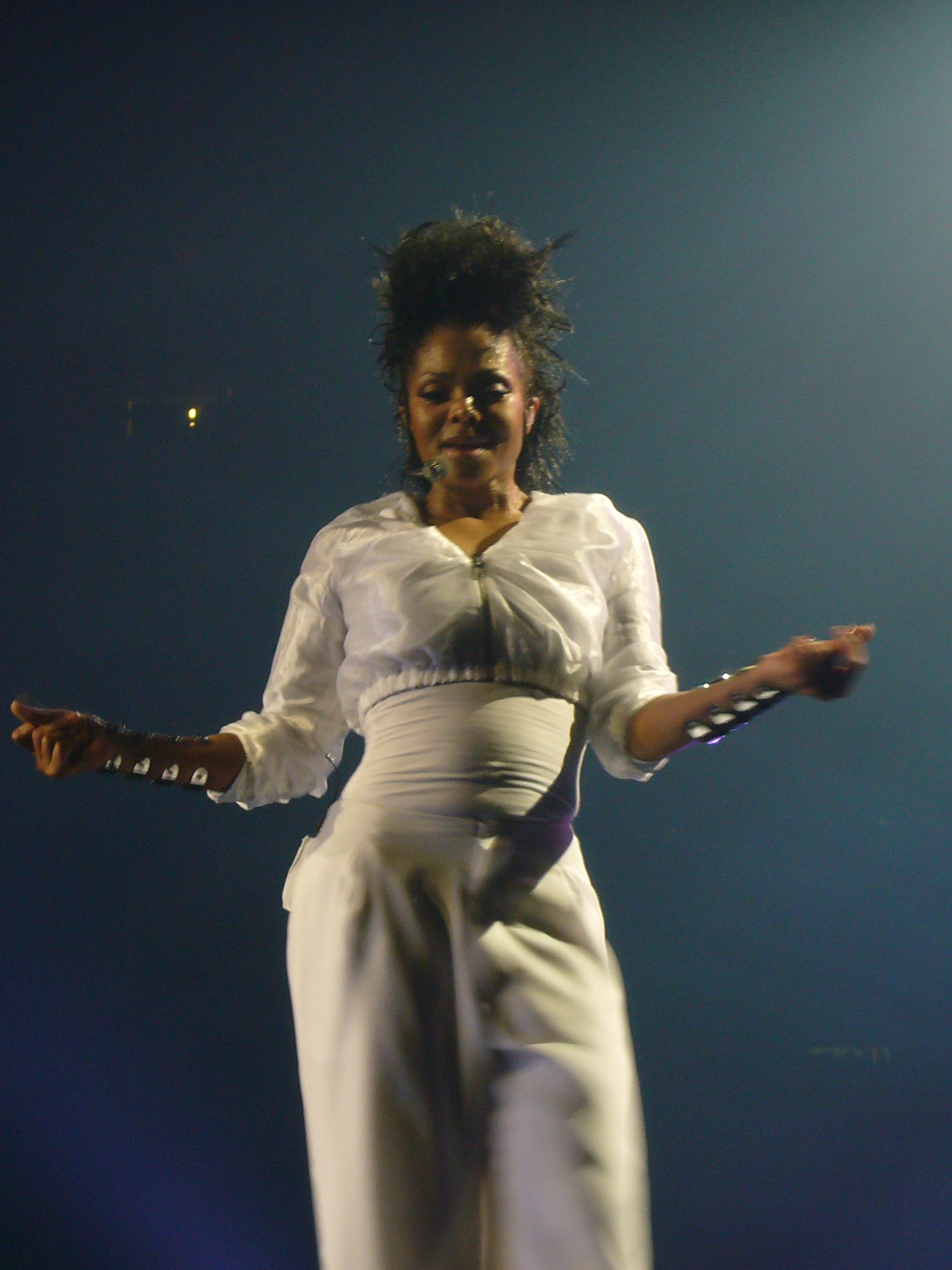
"S&M" became Rihanna's tenth number 1 single on the US Billboard Hot 100 and tied her in fourth place with Janet Jackson (pictured) for female soloists who have topped the chart.

"S&M" made its first chart appearance in the United Kingdom on November 15, 2010, at number 55. It peaked at number 3 on March 5, 2011, where it remained for three consecutive weeks. It was more successful on the UK R&B Chart, where it was number 1 for five consecutive weeks. The song was the second-biggest selling R&B or hip hop single of 2011 in the UK: by December that year, "S&M" had sold 643,000 copies in the UK and was certified quadruple Platinum by the BPI in February 2026. Elsewhere in Europe, "S&M" was a massive commercial success and peaked within the top three in many countries, including number 1 in Poland, number 2 in Denmark Germany, Sweden and Switzerland; number 3 in France, becoming her tenth top ten, and Spain, number 4 in Austria, Finland, and Spain, and number 7 in the Netherlands and number 8 in Czech Republic.

"S&M" debuted on the Australian Singles Chart at number 87 on November 29, 2010, upon the release of Loud. When it was released as a single, it returned to the singles chart at number 27 on January 30, 2011. The song peaked at number 1 on February 13, 2011, for five non-consecutive weeks. It has since been certified six times Platinum by the Australian Recording Industry Association, denoting shipments of over 420,000 copies of the single. The song debuted on the New Zealand Singles Chart at number 6 on February 7, 2011. It peaked at number 2 the following week for two consecutive weeks, and returned to its peak position again in its fifth week on the chart. "S&M" was subsequently certified Platinum by the Recording Industry Association of New Zealand, denoting sales of over 15,000 copies.

In the US, the song debuted at number 53 on the Billboard Hot 100 on December 4, 2010. On the week of February 23, 2011, "S&M" jumped from 31 to 8. After climbing up the chart, the song reached number 2 on March 30, 2011, and stayed for two consecutive weeks, behind Katy Perry's song "E.T.". Following the release of the official remix featuring Spears, the song reached the top of the chart, with the album version of "S&M" and the remix selling a combined total of 293,000 downloads. "S&M" became Rihanna's tenth US number 1 single on the chart, tying her with Janet Jackson in fourth place for female soloists who have topped that chart; with only four years, eleven months and two weeks between her first and tenth number 1 on the chart, Rihanna achieved the milestone faster than any other solo artist. It became Spears' fifth number 1 single on the Hot 100. "S&M" became Rihanna's eighth number 1 song on the Mainstream Top 40 chart and she became the artist with the most number 1 songs in the chart's nineteen-year history. The song was number 1 on the Dance Club Songs chart and number 33 on the Hot Latin Songs chart. It debuted at number 80 on the Hot R&B/Hip-Hop Songs in the February 26, 2011 issue of Billboard, and peaked at number 59. "S&M" peaked at number 24 on the Adult Pop Airplay chart, and at number 14 on the Latin Pop Songs chart. The song has since received a 6× Platinum certification by the Recording Industry Association of America (RIAA), for sales and streaming equivalent-units of 6 million, and has sold 3,837,000 digital copies in the US as of June 2015. "S&M" ranked at number 2 on Billboard's Dance Club Songs year-end chart, and number 15 on its Mainstream Top 40 year-end chart. In Canada, the song peaked at number 1 for the week of April 21, 2011.

== Music video ==
=== Background and synopsis ===
The director Melina Matsoukas filmed the music video for "S&M" in Los Angeles on January 15 and 16, 2011. Matsoukas explained Billboard that the video was inspired by Rihanna's "sadomasochist relationship with the press ... it isn't just about a bunch of whips and chains." On January 27, 2011, a behind-the-scenes clip was posted on Rihanna's YouTube channel, and the full music video premiered on Vevo on February 1, 2011.

As the video opens, Rihanna is arrested into a press conference, where she is covered with plastic wrap and taped to a wall. Microphones and gagged reporters surround her. In an outdoor scene, she wears a beige latex dress and leads a spoofed Perez Hilton around by a dog leash. Rihanna is then shown seated and surrounded by CCTV surveillance cameras; her chair begins to rotate, and she stands and begins to whip reporters, who are taped to the wall of the room. She then rolls on the floor, her hands and feet bound with rope. As the bridge of the song approaches, Rihanna wears a white two-piece latex and rabbit ears, while images of headlines are projected against her body. After the chorus, she appears in a newsroom. Reporters take photographs of her while she sprawls across a desk wearing a pink latex dress. Scenes of Rihanna and others in bondage gear are interspersed with images of Rihanna with frizzy curls while wearing a feather boa and a midriff-baring tube top with "censored" printed across it. The video then alternates between past scenes and images in which Rihanna eats a banana, strawberries and cream, and jeweled ice cream while wearing a heart-shaped eye patch. In the last scene, she lays on a newsroom desk, with a smiley face emblem over one eye and a Rolling Stones tongue logo over her mouth, along with a woman's orgasm sound. Drag queens Willam Belli, Detox Icunt, and Morgan McMichaels appear in the video.

=== Reception and ban ===
The music video was generally well received. A journalist for The Huffington Post wrote, "Rihanna is perfectly good at being bad – and this video proves it", while a reviewer for OK! called the video "red-hot, kinky and totally tongue-in-cheek". Willa Paskin of New York similarly described it as a "goofy" take on the S&M-themed music videos typical of Madonna and Lady Gaga, while Matthew Perpetua of Rolling Stone described the video as a "visual onslaught of candy-colored kinkiness" that viewers would enjoy despite its bright colors and sexually suggestive activities. Brad Wete of Entertainment Weekly stated that Rihanna delivered the risque video he was expecting based on the song's lyrical content, and Jason Lipshutz of Billboard praised the video's "exquisite set pieces that offer a twisted take on hardcore sexuality".

The video was immediately banned in eleven countries due to its overtly sexual content. It was flagged and age-restricted on YouTube for having mature content, although this restriction has since been lifted. On May 2, 2011, the French Superior Audiovisual Council, after having received several complaints from viewers over the broadcasting of the video during the day due to its content, banned the music video from being broadcast before 10 p.m. along with Tonight (I'm Lovin' You) by Enrique Iglesias on all music channels and then was only broadcast the night without warning or with warning Not advised to kids under 10 years old (in French: déconseillé aux moins de 10 ans) or Not advised to kids under 12 years old (déconseillé aux moins de 12 ans) (depending on the channels) because of many sexual and sadomasochistic scenes. Rihanna responded to the news via Twitter, writing, "They watched 'Umbrella' ... I was full nude". An unrestricted version of the video was later uploaded to Rihanna's official website. Melina Matsoukas responded to the news in an interview with MTV News, stating: "When I go out to make something, I kind of go out with the intention to get it banned – [well] not to get it banned ... but to make something provocative ... it's making an effect and people are having a dialogue about it, so, to me, that's successful."

=== Copyright infringement lawsuits ===
Rihanna, in a scene from the video. The "pink room" scene was the subject of a US copyright infringement case

The video was involved in further controversy when photographer David LaChapelle sued Rihanna, Island Def Jam and related parties for copyright infringement. The lawsuit included claims of trade dress infringement under the Lanham Act, unfair competition under New York state law and unjust enrichment, all of which were later dismissed. Federal Judge Shira A. Scheindlin of the Southern District of New York denied Rihanna's motion to dismiss the copyright violation allegations, noting similarities between the works that a trier of fact such as a jury should decide whether they were substantial enough to be infringing:

Both works feature: hot-pink and white striped walls; two single-hung windows in the middle of the back wall; windows with glossy hot-pink casings and interior framework, with opaque panes exhibiting a half-vector pattern of stripes against a yellow background; a solid hot-pink ceiling; hot-pink baseboards; a hot-pink couch under the windows; women wearing frizzy red wigs; a woman posed on top of a piece of furniture; black tape wrapped around a man; and a generally frantic mood ... [Both works are] well-lit and intensely saturated, with all of the details in sharp focus and almost no shadows.

Rihanna and LaChapelle settled the case out of court for an undisclosed sum. Afterwards, he said the lawsuit was "not personal, it's strictly business", and that "musicians commonly pay to sample music or use someone's beats and there should be no difference when sampling an artist's visuals." In June 2011, German photographer Philipp Paulus sued Rihanna and her record labels, alleging further copyright violations with regard to a scene in the music video where Rihanna wears an expansive dress and is taped to the wall with a plastic sheet in front of her. According to Paulus, Rihanna and Matsoukas appropriated the image from his photographic series Paperworld.

== Live performances and covers ==
Rihanna first performed "S&M" at the Brit Awards on February 15, 2011, as part of a medley which incorporated two of her previous singles from Loud, "Only Girl (In the World)" and "What's My Name?". Rihanna had planned to perform "S&M" only, to coincide with its release as a single in the United Kingdom, but she was instructed by the Brit Awards corporation to "tone down the sexual references in the song's lyrics". The singer was reported to be angered at being requested to change her act and that she was asked to consider performing a different song instead.

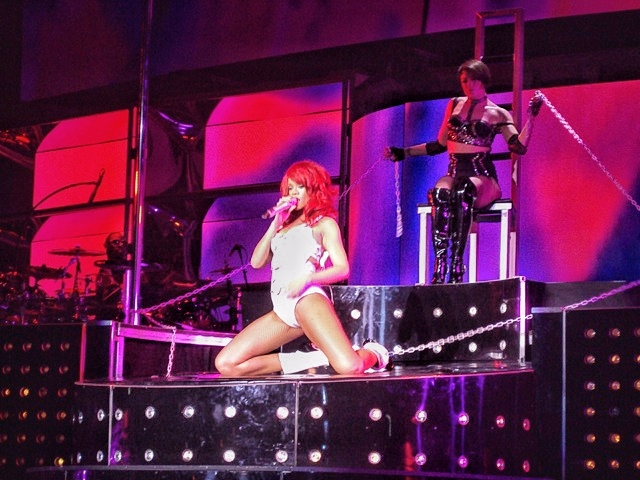
Rihanna performing "S&M" on the Loud Tour in summer 2011, a performance similar to the one from the 2011 Billboard Music Awards

Rihanna opened the 2011 Billboard Music Awards with a performance of the "S&M" remix with Spears on May 22, 2011, at the MGM Grand Garden Arena in Las Vegas. Billboard magazine declared the performance as one of the 15 Awesome Performances at the Billboard Music Awards. Rihanna performed "S&M" on May 27, 2011, on NBC's Today show's "Summer Concert Series", along with "Only Girl (in the World)", "What's My Name?" and "California King Bed". She gave an interview about the album and about her controversial performance at the Billboard Music Awards with Spears. When Rihanna was asked if she was surprised at the controversial reaction the performance prompted, she responded:

It was cool. Nothing popped out. We didn't make out. I mean, I didn't really hear [that it was controversial], but I went up to Twitter to see what my fans thought about it and they were really enjoyed seeing [me and Britney Spears] up there together, so I mean, there will be some people who will think that that was too sexy but you're always gonna find that, you know. People will always talk whether you're doing bad or good. You just have to do you."

The song was included on the set list of the Loud Tour, which began with the stage decorated as a stylized S&M set. The singer performed Prince's "Darling Nikki" with three semi-nude female dancers whom she spanked, groped and pretended to smack with a cane. "Darling Nikki" then transitioned into "S&M" and she took off her white tuxedo, revealing a white bondage corset and handcuffs. "S&M" was featured on the set list of Spears' Femme Fatale Tour (2011), as part of a medley with "...Baby One More Time". Rihanna performed "S&M" at Radio 1's Hackney Weekend on May 24, 2012, as the third song on the set list. The song was included on most of Rihanna's 777 Tour in November 2012; a seven-date and seven-day-long promotional tour in support of the release of her seventh studio album, Unapologetic.

In 2011, "S&M" was featured at the beginning of the seventeenth episode of the American police procedural drama TV series, Hawaii Five-0. Lee Latchford-Evans of the British group Steps covered the song as part of a medley with Maroon 5 and Christina Aguilera's song "Moves like Jagger" in his solo section of The Ultimate Tour (2012). In the 2012 musical comedy film Pitch Perfect, "S&M" was sung a cappella by the song's co-writer Ester Dean, accompanied by Alexis Knapp, Anna Kendrick, Rebel Wilson, Anna Camp and Brittany Snow. The ensemble's performance of the song appears on the film's soundtrack as part of a medley, "Riff Off". "Riff Off" was released as a single in 2012 and reached number 86 on the US Billboard Hot 100 chart. The soundtrack also became the number 1 album on the US Top Soundtracks.

== Formats and track listings ==
- Digital download
1. "S&M" – 4:04
- Digital download (EP)
1. "S&M" – 4:03
2. "S&M" (Dave Audé club) – 7:27
3. "S&M" (Sidney Samson club) – 6:49
- Digital download (remixes)
1. "S&M" (Dave Audé radio) – 3:50
2. "S&M" (Joe Bermudez chico radio) – 3:49
3. "S&M" (Sidney Samson radio) – 3:19
4. "S&M" (Dave Audé club) – 7:27
5. "S&M" (Joe Bermudez chico club) – 5:17
6. "S&M" (Sidney Samson club) – 6:49
7. "S&M" (Dave Audé dub) – 6:29
8. "S&M" (Joe Bermudez chico dub) – 5:17
9. "S&M" (Sidney Samson dub) – 6:50
- CD
1. "S&M" – 4:04
2. "S&M" (Sidney Samson radio remix) – 3:18
- Digital download (remix)
1. "S&M" (remix; featuring Britney Spears) – 4:17

== Credits and personnel ==
Credits adapted from the liner notes of Loud, Def Jam Recordings, SRP Records.

Management

- ASCAP/BMI
- Stargate and Miles Walker both appear on behalf of 45th & 3rd Music LLC
- Stargate's management: Tim Blacksmith and Danny D.
- Sandy Vee appears on behalf of Empire Artist Management
- Kuk Harrell appears on behalf of Suga Wuga Music, Inc.

Recording locations

- Music recording – Roc the Mic Studios (New York); Westlake Recording Studios (Los Angeles); The Bunker Studios (Paris)
- Mixing – The Bunker Studios (Paris); The Ninja Beat Club (Atlanta)

Personnel

- Songwriting – Mikkel S. Eriksen, Tor Erik Hermansen, Sandy Wilhelm, Ester Dean, Britney Spears (remix only)
- Production – Stargate, Sandy Vee
- Vocal production and recording – Kuk Harrell, Josh Gudwin, Marcos Tovar
- Assistant recording – Bobby Campbell
- Additional vocal production – Veronika Bozeman
- Instruments – Mikkel S. Eriksen, Tor Erik Hermansen, Sandy Vee
- Music recording – Mikkel S. Eriksen, Miles Walker, Sandy Vee
- Mixing – Sandy Vee, Phil Tan
- Additional engineering – Damien Lewis

== Charts ==
=== Weekly charts ===
2011 weekly chart performance
Chart (2011)	Peak position
Australia (ARIA)	1
Austria (Ö3 Austria Top 40)	4
Belgium (Ultratop 50 Flanders)	3
Belgium (Ultratop 50 Wallonia)	4
Brazil (Billboard Brasil Hot 100)	25
Brazil Hot Pop Songs	8
Canada Hot 100 (Billboard)	1
CIS Airplay (TopHit)	5
Croatia International Airplay (HRT)	3
Czech Republic Airplay (ČNS IFPI)	8
Denmark (Tracklisten)	2
Euro Digital Song Sales (Billboard)	4
Euro Digital Tracks (Billboard) Britney Spears remix	13
Finland (Suomen virallinen lista)	4
France (SNEP)	3
Germany (GfK)	2
Germany Airplay (BVMI)	1
Greece Digital Songs (Billboard)	4
Hungary (Rádiós Top 40)	1
Ireland (IRMA)	3
Israel International Airplay (Media Forest)	1
Italy (FIMI)	6
Japan Hot 100 (Billboard)	8
Luxembourg (Billboard)	1
Mexico (Billboard Mexican Airplay)	12
Mexico Anglo Airplay (Monitor Latino)	10
Netherlands (Dutch Top 40)	8
Netherlands (Single Top 100)	7
New Zealand (Recorded Music NZ)	2
Norway (VG-lista)	2
Poland Airplay (ZPAV)	1
Portugal (Billboard)	6
Romania Airplay (Media Forest)	3
Russia Airplay (TopHit)	7
Scottish Singles Sales (Official Charts)	3
Slovakia Airplay (ČNS IFPI)	4
South Korea (Circle) (remix featuring Britney Spears)	78
South Korea International (Circle) (original)	49
Spain (Promusicae)	3
Sweden (Sverigetopplistan)	2
Switzerland (Schweizer Hitparade)	2
UK Singles (Official Charts)	3
UK Hip Hop/R&B (Official Charts)	1
Ukraine Airplay (TopHit)	47
US Billboard Hot 100	1
US Adult Pop Airplay (Billboard)	24
US Dance Club Songs (Billboard)	1
US Hot Latin Songs (Billboard)	33
US Hot R&B/Hip-Hop Songs (Billboard)	59
US Pop Airplay (Billboard)	1
US Rhythmic Airplay (Billboard)	2

2023 weekly chart performance
Chart (2023)	Peak position
Global 200 (Billboard)	132
US Digital Song Sales (Billboard)	44
US Hot Dance/Electronic Songs (Billboard)	9

2025–2026 weekly chart performance
Chart (2025–2026)	Peak position
Czech Republic Singles Digital (ČNS IFPI)	53
Greece International (IFPI)	39
Poland (Polish Streaming Top 100)	76
Slovakia Singles Digital (ČNS IFPI)	45

=== Year-end charts ===
2011 year-end chart performance
Chart (2011)	Position
Australia (ARIA)	11
Australia Hip-Hop/R&B (ARIA)	2
Austria (Ö3 Austria Top 40)	17
Belgian (Ultratop 50 Flanders)	14
Belgian (Ultratop 50 Wallonia)	12
Brazil (Crowley Broadcast Analysis) (remix featuring Britney Spears)	38
Canada Hot 100 (Billboard)	20
CIS (TopHit)	16
Croatia International Airplay (HRT)	21
Denmark (Tracklisten)	25
France (SNEP)	14
Germany (GfK)	26
Greece (IFPI)	58
Hungary (Dance Top 40)	17
Hungary (Rádiós Top 40)	23
Ireland (IRMA)	13
Israel (Media Forest)	22
Italy (Musica e dischi)	59
Netherlands (Dutch Top 40)	49
Netherlands (Single Top 100)	39
New Zealand (Recorded Music NZ)	18
Poland Dance Top 50 (ZPAV)	12
Romania (Romanian Top 100)	60
Russia Airplay (TopHit)	23
South Korea Foreign (Circle) (original)	156
South Korea Foreign (Circle) (remix featuring Britney Spears)	19
Spain (PROMUSICAE)	22
Sweden (Sverigetopplistan)	15
Switzerland (Schweizer Hitparade)	25
UK Singles (Official Charts)	12
UK Hip Hop/R&B (Official Charts)	2
Ukraine Airplay (TopHit)	79
US Billboard Hot 100	12
US Dance Club Songs (Billboard)	2
US Pop Airplay (Billboard)	15
US Rhythmic Airplay (Billboard)	15

2012 year-end chart performance
Chart (2012)	Position
South Korea Foreign (Circle) (remix featuring Britney Spears)	197

2023 year-end chart performance
Chart (2023)	Position
US Hot Dance/Electronic Songs (Billboard)	75

2024 year-end chart performance
Chart (2024)	Position
Hungary (Rádiós Top 40)	100

2025 year-end chart performance
Chart (2025)	Position
Hungary (Rádiós Top 40)	85

== Certifications and sales ==
Certifications and sales
Region	Certification	Certified units/sales
Australia (ARIA)	12× Platinum	840,000^{‡}
Belgium (BRMA)	Platinum	30,000^{*}
Brazil (Pro-Música Brasil)	Diamond	250,000^{‡}
Denmark (IFPI Danmark)	3× Platinum	270,000^{‡}
Finland (Musiikkituottajat)	Gold	5,000
France	—	124,500
Germany (BVMI)	2× Platinum	1,200,000^{‡}
Italy (FIMI)	Platinum	30,000^{*}
New Zealand (RMNZ)	5× Platinum	150,000^{‡}
South Korea (Gaon)	—	116,783
Spain (Promusicae)	Platinum	60,000^{‡}
Switzerland (IFPI Switzerland)	Platinum	30,000^{^}
United Kingdom (BPI)	4× Platinum	2,400,000^{‡}
United States (RIAA)	6× Platinum	6,000,000^{‡}
Streaming
Greece (IFPI Greece)	2× Platinum	4,000,000^{†}
^{*} Sales figures based on certification alone.^{^} Shipments figures based on certification alone.^{‡} Sales+streaming figures based on certification alone.^{†} Streaming-only figures based on certification alone.

Certifications and sales for the remix
Region	Certification	Certified units/sales
Brazil (Pro-Música Brasil)	Gold	30,000^{‡}
South Korea (Note: Sales from 2011 and 2012)	—	593,867
Spain (Promusicae)	Gold	20,000^{‡}
Sweden (GLF)	3× Platinum	120,000^{‡}
United States (RIAA)	Gold	500,000^{‡}
^{‡} Sales+streaming figures based on certification alone.

== Release history ==
Release history
Region	Date	Format(s)	Version(s)	Label	Ref.
United States	January 23, 2011	Contemporary hit radio; rhythmic contemporary radio	Original	Def Jam	
Various	February 11, 2011	Digital download	Original	Def Jam	
Various	February 18, 2011	Digital download	Original; Dave Audé club; Sidney Samson club	Def Jam	
United States	February 27, 2011	Urban contemporary radio	Original	Def Jam	
Various	February 28, 2011	Digital download	Remixes	Def Jam	
Germany	March 18, 2011	CD	Original; Sidney Samson radio remix	Universal	
Italy	March 18, 2011	Radio airplay	Original	Universal	
Various	April 11, 2011	Digital download	Remix featuring Britney Spears	Def Jam	

== See also ==
- List of number-one singles of 2011 (Australia)
- List of Canadian Hot 100 number-one singles of 2011
- List of number-one singles of 2011 (Poland)
- List of UK R&B Singles Chart number ones of 2011
- List of Billboard Hot 100 number ones of 2011
- List of Radio Songs number ones of the 2010s
- List of number-one dance airplay hits of 2011 (U.S.)
- List of Billboard Dance Club Songs number ones of 2011
- List of number-one digital songs of 2011 (U.S.)
- List of Billboard Mainstream Top 40 number-one songs of 2011
- List of Billboard Hot 100 top-ten singles in 2011
- List of highest-certified singles in Australia
