= Isocolon =

Figure of speech

Eugène Delacroix's Liberty Leading the People evokes the French revolutionary spirit captured in the tricolon which is the national motto of France: "liberté, egalité, fraternité."

Isocolon is a rhetorical scheme in which parallel elements, such as words, phrases, or sentences, possess approximately the same number of words or syllables. As in any form of parallelism, the pairs or series must enumerate like things to achieve symmetry. The scheme is called bicolon, tricolon, or tetracolon depending on whether they are two, three, or four parallel elements.

== Etymology ==
The term, a compound of ἴσος ísos 'equal' and κῶλον kôlon 'member, clause' was used in the classical Greek rhetorical literature:

...εἶδος δὲ τοῦ παρομοίου τὸ ἰσόκωλον, ἐπὰν ἴσας ἔχῃ τὰ κῶλα τὰς συλλαβάς...
Under the heading of symmetry of members comes equality of members, which occurs when the members contain an equal number of syllables...

— pseudo-Demetrius of Phalerum, Περὶ ἑρμηνείας (On Style)

The Greek plural is 'isocola', but 'isocolons' is also used in English.

== Rhetorical use ==
Isocola are typically categorized by the number of units they have; it may be referred to as a bicolon, tricolon, and tetracolon which have two, three, and four elements respectively. Additionally, a tetracolon may be referred to as a quatrain.

While an isocolon may have the exact same number of syllables, the length of the sounds of the clauses generally need to only approximately balance each other. An example providing in Rhetorica Ad Herennium follows:

The father was meeting death in battle; the son was planning marriage at his home. These omens wrote grievous disasters

Notice the parallelism found in each clause as well as the last clauses having different number of syllables. (Note: Rhetorica ad Herennium is written in Latin, a language that has syllable weight. Still, in both the translation and the original, the lines have different syllable length.) The strictness of the definition of isocola is variable such as the extent to which the syllables of the units need to match. Additionally the prosody of the units may or may not match.

Isocola are often used to add balance, symmetry, and flow to a text. Often, advertisers and politicians will use an isocolon (especially a bicolon) for its memorability and persuasiveness in slogans and speeches; the device can provide additional credibility and veridicality to a claim without logical merit for said validation. Additionally, isocola can be used to add emphasis.

The trinity found in tricola are often found to be especially effective rhetorically, said to give an effect of wholeness or completeness. In contrast, having only two elements may have the effect of creating a contrast or comparison; for example, in the bicolon "mice and men" may imply a comparison of small and big, whether intentional or not. Puttenham suggests that the number of elements of a isocolon (Note: Puttenham refers to the device as a "Parison, or the Figure of euen," though it is the same as an isocolon) should not exceed four.

Mark Forsyth suggests that tricola are the most effective when the final element is the longest in length. For instance, in Mark Antony's "Friends, romans, countrymen" from Shakespeare's Julius Caesar, each element increases in number syllables. By Forsyth's definition, tricola are not constricted by number of words or syllable lengths, so other sets of three clauses (such as "life, liberty, and the pursuit of happiness") would also apply to this rule.

An isocolon may be used humorously where the punchline hinges on the final element diverging from the pattern. For example, take the following quote by Dorothy Parker: "I require three things in a man: he must be handsome, ruthless and stupid."

According to Randy Allen Harris, the similar prosody and syntax in isocola— such as "spare the rod, spoil the child—" leverage the formal alignment of endophoric iconicity (the resemblance of signifiers to one another) to emphasize the conceptual alignment. Harris provides the following phrase, commonly attributed to Benjamin Franklin, as an example:

"We must hang together or we will certainly hang separately"

The isocolonic syntax (as well as other sublexical repetitions (Note: 'Sublexical repetitions' refers to figures of repetition dealing with units below the meaning of words (lexical) such as rhyming, consonance, assonance, etc.)) develop a relationship between the "signans-signans resemblances evoke signatum-signatum affiliations. (Note: 'Signans' (pl. 'signatia') refers to the physical structure of the language while 'signatum' (pl. 'signata') refers to the mental concept or assigned meaning of said signan.)" In other words, the isocolonic relationship between the structure and syntax of the clauses affects the relationship between the meanings of said clauses.

== Special types of isocola ==
A tricolon that comprises parts in increasing size, magnitude or intensity is called a tricolon crescens, or an ascending tricolon. An example of a tricolon crescens is found in Edgar Allan Poe's King Pest: "Out burst a deluge of liquor so fierce – so impetuous – so overwhelming – that the room was flooded from wall to wall." Inversely, a tricolon diminuens is a tricolon crescens that descends instead of ascending.

Repeating the same thing multiple times is a special case of an isocolon, as a way of saying that only one thing is important, and it is very important. In about 1500, when Louis XII asked Giangiacopo Trivulzio what was necessary to win the war against Ludovico Sforza, Trivulzio answered: "Three things, Sire, Money, money, money!" In the 20th century, the cliché "Location, location, location" was said to enumerate the three most important attributes of real property. This phrase appears in print in Chicago as early as 1926, but is frequently and incorrectly credited to the British real estate magnate Harold Samuel. British Prime Minister Tony Blair set out his priorities for office in 1997 with "Education, education, education".

A special type of collocation known as an irreversible binomial is a bicolon that is both short and so well known that it becomes a fixed expression. Not all irreversible binomials are bicola or tricola, however. Irreversible binomials generally consist of only a few words at most. Examples of irreversible binomials include "macaroni and cheese" or "tic-tac-toe" (note that it would be abnormal to say "cheese and macaroni" or "toe-tac-tic").

== Examples ==
=== Bicola ===
- "Roses are red. Violets are blue" — children's rhyme
- "Thy kingdom come, thy will be done" — Christian prayer
- "Ask not what your country can do for you; ask what you can do for your country" — John F. Kennedy, his inaugural address

==== In the Bible ====
In Biblical poetry it is standard to see a pair of adjacent lines of poetry in which the second echoes the meaning of the first. This can be considered a bicolon. An example is found in Psalm 113:1-8 (Psalm 114 Hebrew):

When Israel went out of Egypt, * the house of Jacob from a barbarous people:
Judea made his sanctuary, * Israel his dominion.
The sea saw and fled: * Jordan was turned back.
The mountains skipped like rams, * and the hills like the lambs of the flock.
What ailed thee, O thou sea, that thou didst flee: * and thou, O Jordan, that thou wast turned back?
Ye mountains, that ye skipped like rams, * and ye hills, like lambs of the flock?
At the presence of the Lord the earth was moved, * at the presence of the God of Jacob:
Who turned the rock into pools of water, * and the stony hill into fountains of waters.

=== Tricola ===
- "Veni, vidi, vici" ("I came, I saw, I conquered") — attributed to Julius Caesar
- "Tell me and I forget. Teach me and I remember. Involve me and I learn." — Benjamin Franklin
- "But in a larger sense we cannot dedicate, we cannot consecrate, we cannot hallow this ground" — Abraham Lincoln, Gettysburg Address
- "I foamed — I raved — I swore! I swung the chair upon which I had been sitting, and grated it upon the boards, but the noise arose over all and continually increased" — Edgar Allan Poe, "The Tell-Tale Heart"
- "With malice toward none, with charity toward all, with firmness in the right" — Abraham Lincoln, his second inaugural address
- "It is a war in which the whole British Empire and Commonwealth of Nations is engaged without distinction of race, creed or party" — Winston Churchill

=== Tetracola ===
- "I’ll give my jewels for a set of beads, / My gorgeous palace for a hermitage,/ My gay apparel for an almsman’s gown,/ My figured goblets for a dish of wood" — William Shakespeare, Richard II
- "As Caesar loved me, I weep for him. As he / was fortunate, I rejoice at it. As he was valiant, / I honor him. But, as he was ambitious, I slew him. / There is tears for his love, joy for his fortune, honor / for his valor, and death for his ambition." — Shakespeare, Julius Caesar
- "It was raw mortar, and then it was terra cotta, and then it seemed like bronze, and now it is a living thing" — Gabriele D'Annunzio

=== Irreversible Binomial ===
- smoke and mirrors
- alive and kicking
- cloak and dagger
- command and control
- each and every
- part and parcel
- lie, cheat, or steal
- name it and claim it
- rank and file
- signed, sealed, and delivered
- tic-tac-toe
- finders, keepers; losers, weepers
- carpe diem, carpe noctem, carpe vitam
- in vino veritas, in aqua sanitas
- brain and brawn
- meat and potatoes
- rape and pillage
- divide and conquer
- tall, dark, and handsome
- pins and needles
- brains and beauty
- rock and roll
- spick and span
- chalk and cheese

== See also ==
- Hendiatris
- Figure of speech
- Rule of three (writing)
- Triad (disambiguation)
- Epizeuxis
