= Artistic license =

Deliberate distortion of rules or convention for aesthetic reasons

Artistic license (and more general or contextually-specific, derivative terms such as creative license, poetic license, historical license, dramatic license, and narrative license) refers to deviation from fact or form for artistic purposes. It can include the alteration of grammar or language, or the rewording of pre-existing text.

== History ==
The artistic license may also refer to the ability of an artist to apply smaller distortions, such as a poet ignoring some of the minor requirements of grammar for poetic effect. For example, Mark Antony's "Friends, Romans, Countrymen, lend me your ears" from Shakespeare's Julius Caesar would technically require the word "and" before "countrymen", but the conjunction "and" is omitted to preserve the rhythm of iambic pentameter (the resulting conjunction is called an asyndetic tricolon). Conversely, on the next line, the end of "I come to bury Caesar, not to praise him" has an extra syllable because omitting the word "him" would make the sentence unclear, but adding a syllable at the end would not disrupt the meter. Both of these are examples of artistic license.

Another example of artistic license is the way in which stylized images of an object (for instance in a painting or an animated movie) are different from their real life counterparts, but are still intended to be interpreted by the viewer as representing the same thing. This can mean the omission of details, or the simplification of shapes and color shades, even to the point that the image is nothing more than a pictogram. It can also mean the addition of non-existing details, or exaggeration of shapes and colours, as in fantasy art or a caricature.

Certain stylizations have become fixed conventions in art; an agreement between artist and viewer that is understood and undebatable. A striking example is how in simple cartoon drawings' monochromatic white parts on a dark colored surface are immediately recognized by most viewers to represent the reflection of light on a smooth or wet surface.

In summary, artistic license is:

- Entirely at the artist's discretion
- Intended to be tolerated by the viewer (cf. "willing suspension of disbelief")
- Useful for filling in gaps, whether they be factual, compositional, historical or other gaps
- Used consciously or unconsciously, intentionally or unintentionally (or even in tandem).

== Dramatic license ==
Artistic license is often referred to as dramatic license when it involves the glamorization of real-world occupations for the sake of exciting television or cinematic experience. For example, CSI: Crime Scene Investigation and other police procedural programs typically omit completely the more mundane aspects of the occupation such as paperwork, reports, administrative duties and other daily "business-oriented" aspects which in reality often constitute the majority of police work. They will also present other duties with much more action, suspense or drama than would be experienced in reality. The same is also true for many military-oriented adventure stories which often show high-ranking characters being allowed to continuously enter dangerous situations when in reality, they would usually be restricted to command-oriented and administrative duties.

== Controversy and criticism ==
Artistic license often provokes controversy by offending those who resent the reinterpretation of cherished beliefs or previous works. Artists often respond to these criticisms by pointing out that their work was not intended to be a verbatim portrayal of something previous and should be judged only on artistic merit. Artistic license is a generally accepted practice, particularly when the result is widely acclaimed. William Shakespeare's historical plays, for example, are gross distortions of historical fact but are nevertheless lauded as outstanding literary works.

Critical voices are sometimes raised when artistic license is applied to cinematic and other depictions of real historical events. While slight manipulation for dramatic effect of chronology and character traits are generally accepted, some critics feel that depictions that present a significantly altered reality are irresponsible, particularly because many viewers and readers do not know the actual events and may thus take the dramatized depiction to be true to reality. Examples of films and television series criticized for excessive use of dramatic license include Disney's Pocahontas, Mel Gibson's Braveheart, Oliver Stone's Alexander, the HBO series Rome, 20th Century Fox's The Greatest Showman and Showtime's The Tudors.

Writers adapting a work for another medium (e.g., a film screenplay from a book) often make significant changes, additions to, or omissions from the original plot in the book, on the grounds that these changes were necessary to make a good film. These changes are sometimes to the dismay of fans of the original work.
