= Free and clear =

Term of law referring to ownership without legal encumbrances

In property law, the term free and clear refers to ownership without legal encumbrances, such as a lien or mortgage. For example: a person owns a house free and clear if he has paid off the mortgage and no creditor has filed a lien against it.

Lately there has been a resurgence in interest for free and clear properties despite being an investment form that has been prevalent from early on. Investing in free and clear properties removes the need for a bank loan entirely. Over 35% of all properties in the United States are owned free and clear with no outstanding mortgages or liens.

== See also ==
- Land title
- Legal doublet
