= Death and taxes (idiom) =

Phrase referencing Benjamin Franklin

"Death and taxes" is a phrase commonly referencing a famous quotation written by American statesman Benjamin Franklin:

Our new Constitution is now established, and has an appearance that promises permanency; but in this world nothing can be said to be certain, except death and taxes.

— Franklin, in a letter to Jean-Baptiste Le Roy, 1789

Although Franklin is not the progenitor of the phrase, his usage is the most famous, especially in the United States. Earlier versions from the 18th century include a line in Daniel Defoe's The Political History of the Devil (1726), and a quotation from The Cobbler of Preston by Christopher Bullock (1716), which is the earliest known iteration.

You lye, you are not sure; for I say, Woman, 'tis impossible to be sure of any thing but Death and Taxes

— Toby Guzzle, in Christopher Bullock, The Cobbler of Preston, p. 21

== Analysis ==
Seth Lloyd, writing in Nature, grouped the two with the second law of thermodynamics and said of them:

All three are processes in which useful or accessible forms of some quantity, such as energy or money, are transformed into useless, inaccessible forms of the same quantity. That is not to say that these three processes don't have fringe benefits: taxes pay for roads and schools; the second law of thermodynamics drives cars, computers and metabolism; and death, at the very least, opens up tenured faculty positions.

== See also ==
- Irreversible binomial, a pair or group of words used together in fixed order
