= Figura etymologica =

Rhetorical figure

Figura etymologica is a rhetorical figure in which words with the same etymological derivation are used in the same passage. To count as a figura etymologica, it is necessary that the two words be genuinely different words and not just different inflections of the same word. For example, the sentence Once I loved, but I love no more is not a figura etymologica since although love and loved are obviously etymologically related, they are really just inflections of the same word. That makes this sentence a polyptoton.

Examples in modern English are the phrases "might and main" (both of which are derived from the Proto-Indo-European root megʰ-) and "chai tea", in which both come from words for tea (cha and te) in different Chinese dialects.

The figura etymologica has both a narrower and a broader definition. In the narrower definition, it is restricted to the use of the accusative with cognate verbs (for example, live a good life, sing a long song, die a quiet death). In the Western medieval tradition, it is often expressed in phrases like to sail a sailing, to run a running, or even to propose a proposal. In modern linguistics, this same construction goes by the name of "cognate object construction" (COC).

In the broader definition, the figura etymologica refers to just about any sort of repetition of cognate words relatively close to each other.

== See also ==
- Antanaclasis
- Cognate object
- Hendiadys
- Legal doublet
- Merism
- Pleonasm (the use of more words than necessary to express an idea)
- Polyptoton (a stylistic scheme in which words derived from the same root are repeated)
