= Sacrifice of Isaac (Andrea del Sarto) =

Paintings by Andrea del Sarto

The Sacrifice of Isaac
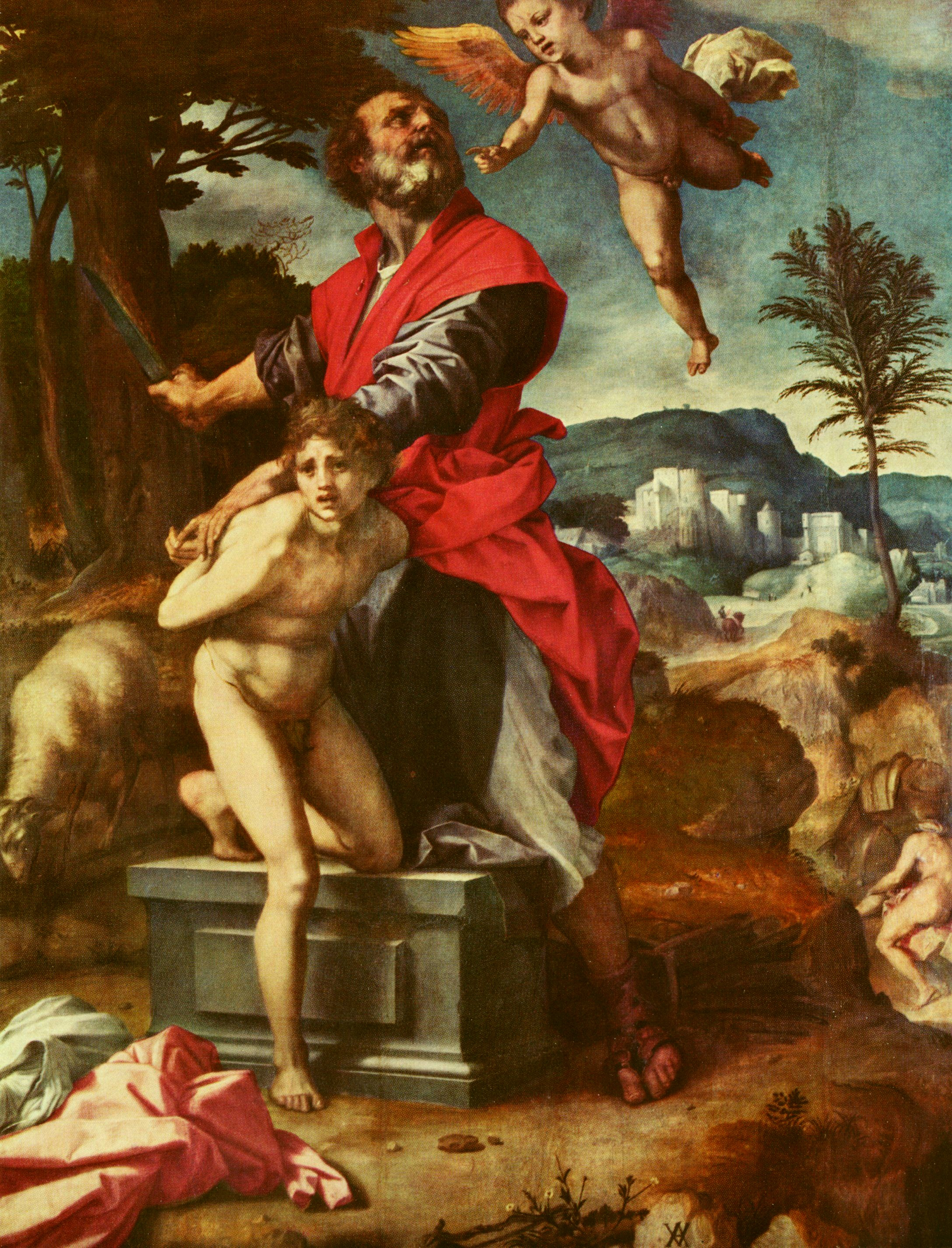
- Year: 1527 (Julian)
- Dimensions: 213 cm (84 in) × 159 cm (63 in)
- Location: Gemäldegalerie Alte Meister
- Collection: Staatliche Kunstsammlungen Dresden
- Accession no.: Gal.-Nr. 77

Sacrifice of Isaac is a work by the Italian Renaissance painter Andrea del Sarto, existing in three versions at the Gemäldegalerie Alte Meister in Dresden (213 x 159 cm; 1527–1529), the Cleveland Museum of Art (178 x 138 cm) and the Museo del Prado (98 x 69 cm; c.1527–1530).

== History ==
The Dresden version was commissioned in 1527 by Giovanni Battista Della Palla as a gift for Francis I of France, who around ten years earlier had hosted the artist at the Palace of Fontainebleau. Della Palla was imprisoned before the work could be completed and just before the artist's death, after which three versions were made, as recorded in Giorgio Vasari's Lives of the Artists, with different dimensions and levels of finish. The work now in Cleveland was probably a test-piece left incomplete, whilst the Dresden version (the largest and most finished) was possibly intended for Francis but was instead seized by Alfonso d'Avalos, marchese del Vasto, who had his monogram added on the rock in the foreground. The Dresden version was in the Este collection in Modena, from which it was sold in 1746 in the Dresden Sale.

Some argue that the version owned by the Marchese was in fact the smallest of the three, the one now in Madrid, which is identical to the Dresden version and thus probably slightly later than it. The Madrid version is known to have been acquired by Charles, Prince of Asturias, later Charles IV of Spain, and appears in the written record for the first time in a 1779 inventory of the relatively informal royal residence built for the prince, the Casita del Príncipe in the grounds of the Escorial Monastery. It was later recorded at the Royal Palace of Aranjuez in 1814, before the Spanish royal collections were transferred to the Prado.

== Gallery ==
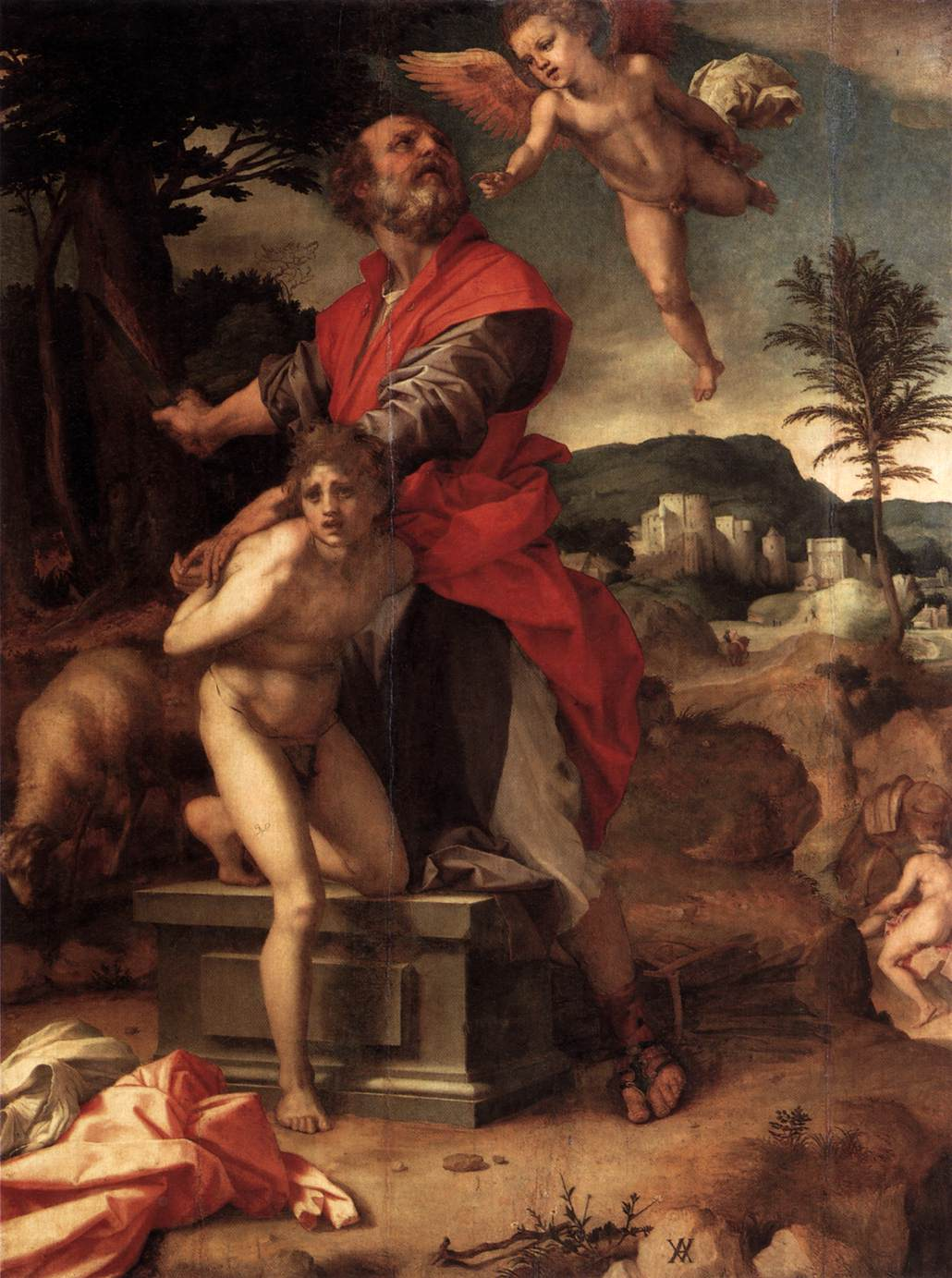
Dresden version

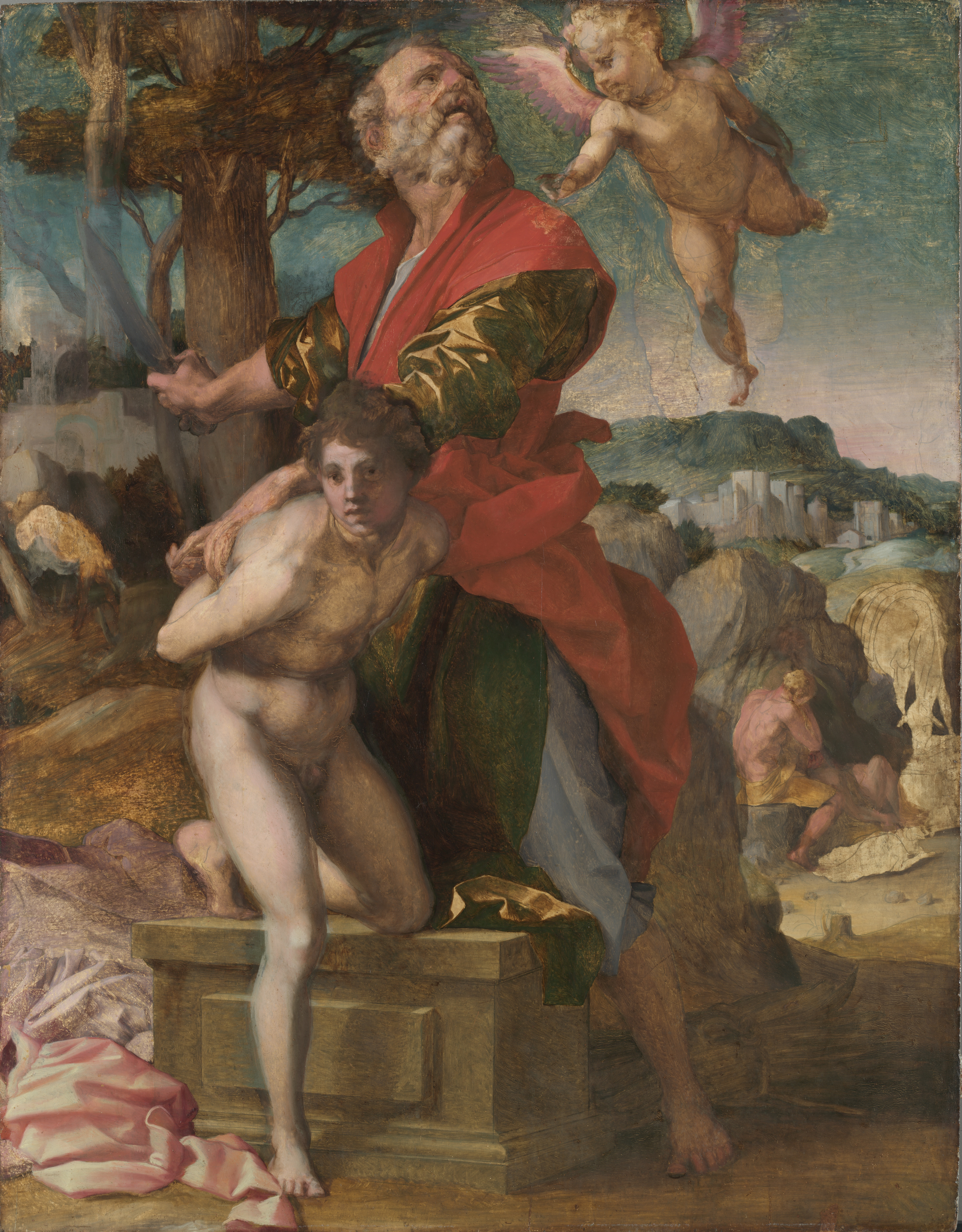
Cleveland version

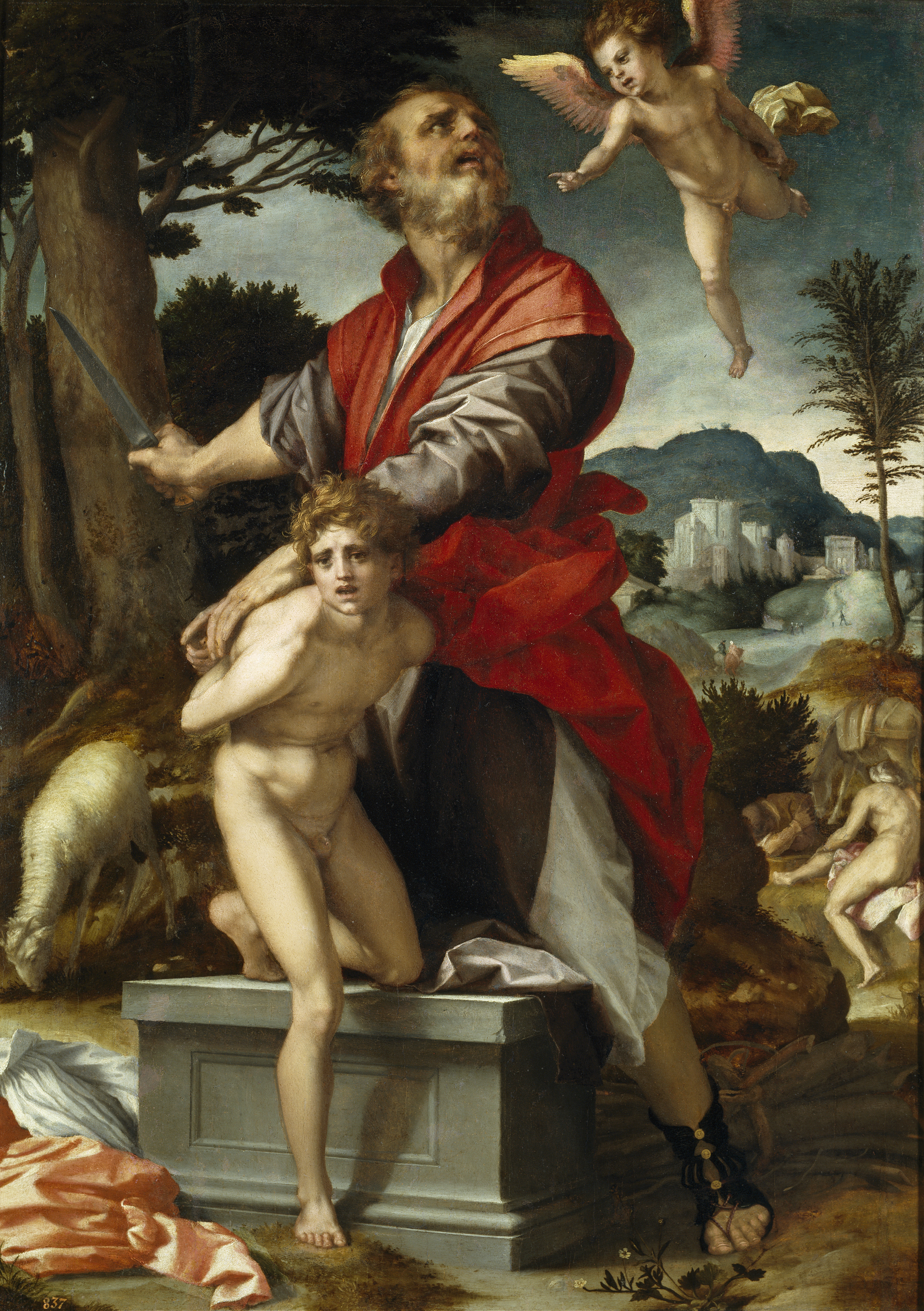
Prado version
