= Bump and run =

Bump and Run may refer to

- Bump and run coverage, a defensive strategy in American football
- Bump and run (auto racing)
- Bump and run (golf)
