= Cognate object =

In linguistics, a cognate object (also known as a cognate accusative or an internal accusative) is a verb's object which is etymologically related to the verb. More specifically, the verb is one that is ordinarily intransitive (lacking any object), and the cognate object is simply the verb's noun form. For example, in the sentence He slept a troubled sleep, sleep is the cognate object of the verb slept. This construction also has a passive form. The passive is A troubled sleep was slept by him. Cognate objects exist in many languages, including various unrelated ones, including Ancient Greek, Arabic, Chichewa, English, German, Hebrew, Icelandic, Japanese, Korean, Latin, and Russian.

== Examples ==
In English, the construction can occur with a number of intransitive verbs, which then become transitive:

- He slept a troubled sleep. (He slept, and his sleep was troubled.)
- He laughed a bitter laugh. (He laughed bitterly.)
- He dreamed a strange dream. (He dreamed, and his dream was strange.)
- He walked their walk and talked their talk. (He walked and talked as they did.)
- He smiled a charming smile. (He smiled, and his smile was charming.)
- He danced a cheerful dance. (He danced, and his dance was cheerful.)
- He died a painful death. (He died painfully.)

In some of these cases, the cognate object allows for a simpler construction. In others, it may be chosen for idiomatic or rhetorical reasons. In general, the cognate object's modifiers are in some sense modifying the verb: for example, He slept a troubled sleep tells how he slept. Semantically, many of these verbs denote modes of nonverbal expression (laugh, smile) and bodily actions or motions (dance, walk, sleep), specifically including what Levin calls "waltz verbs," those that are zero-related (identical) to the names of dances.

== See also ==
- Antanaclasis
- Figura etymologica
- Hendiadys
- Legal doublet
- Merism
- Pleonasm (the use of more words than necessary to express an idea)
- Polyptoton (a stylistic scheme in which words derived from the same root are repeated)
