= Past, Present, Future =

Past, Present, Future or Past, Present and Future may refer to:

== Books ==
- Islam: Past, Present and Future, a book by Hans Küng
- Past, Present and Future, a book series by Nat Schachner
- Past, Present and Future (1987), a book by Isaac Asimov

== Music ==
=== Albums ===
- Past, Present, Future, a 1995 album by Morgana Lefay
- Past, Present, Future (Tiki Taane album), 2007
- Past:Present:Future, a 2006 two-part EP series by Chipz
- Past, Present and Future (Al Stewart album), 1973
- Past, Present & Future (Rob Zombie album), 2003
- Past, Present, & Future, an album by Aron Burton
- Trilogy: Past Present Future, by Frank Sinatra, 1980
- Trinity (Past, Present and Future), by Slum Village, 2002
- HIStory: Past, Present and Future, Book I, by Michael Jackson, 1995
- Pa La Calle: Pasado, Presente y Futuro, a 2010 mixtape by Zion & Lennox
- The Past, the Present, the Future (Mark 'Oh album), 2009
- Past Present Future, by Manu Dibango, 2011
- The Past, the Present, the Future (Jodeci album), 2015\
- Past // Present // Future, by Meet Me at the Altar, 2023

=== Songs ===
- "Past, Present, and Future", a song by Abby Travis
- "Past, Present and Future", a song by Agnetha Fältskog from My Colouring Book
- "Past, Present and Future", a song by Allen Kwela
- "Past, Present, & Future", a song by Aron Burton
- "Past, Present and Future", a song by Grant Green from The Final Comedown
- "Past Present and Future", a song by Marianne Faithfull from Horses and High Heels
- "Past Present and Future", a song by Ronnie Self
- "Past, Present and Future", a song by the Shangri-Las
- "Past Present and Future", a song by Sibongile Khumalo
- "My Past, My Present and My Future", a song by Russ Columbo
- "Sound Image of the Past, Present and Future", a song by Muhal Richard Abrams from Family Talk
- "Visions of the Past, Present and Future", a song by White Hills
- "You're My Past, Present, and Future", a song by Joe Venuti

== Television ==
- "Past, Present, and Future" (NCIS), a 2013 episode
- "Lost: Past, Present & Future", a season 4 clip-show recapping the first three seasons of the television series Lost

== See also ==
- Grammatical tense
- "The Past, Present and Future", a 63-minute recording by Thích Nhất Hạnh
- Ghost of Christmas Past, Ghost of Christmas Present and Ghost of Christmas Future, fictional characters in English novel A Christmas Carol, by Charles Dickens
- Time
