= Legal doublet =

Irreversible binomial in legalese jargon

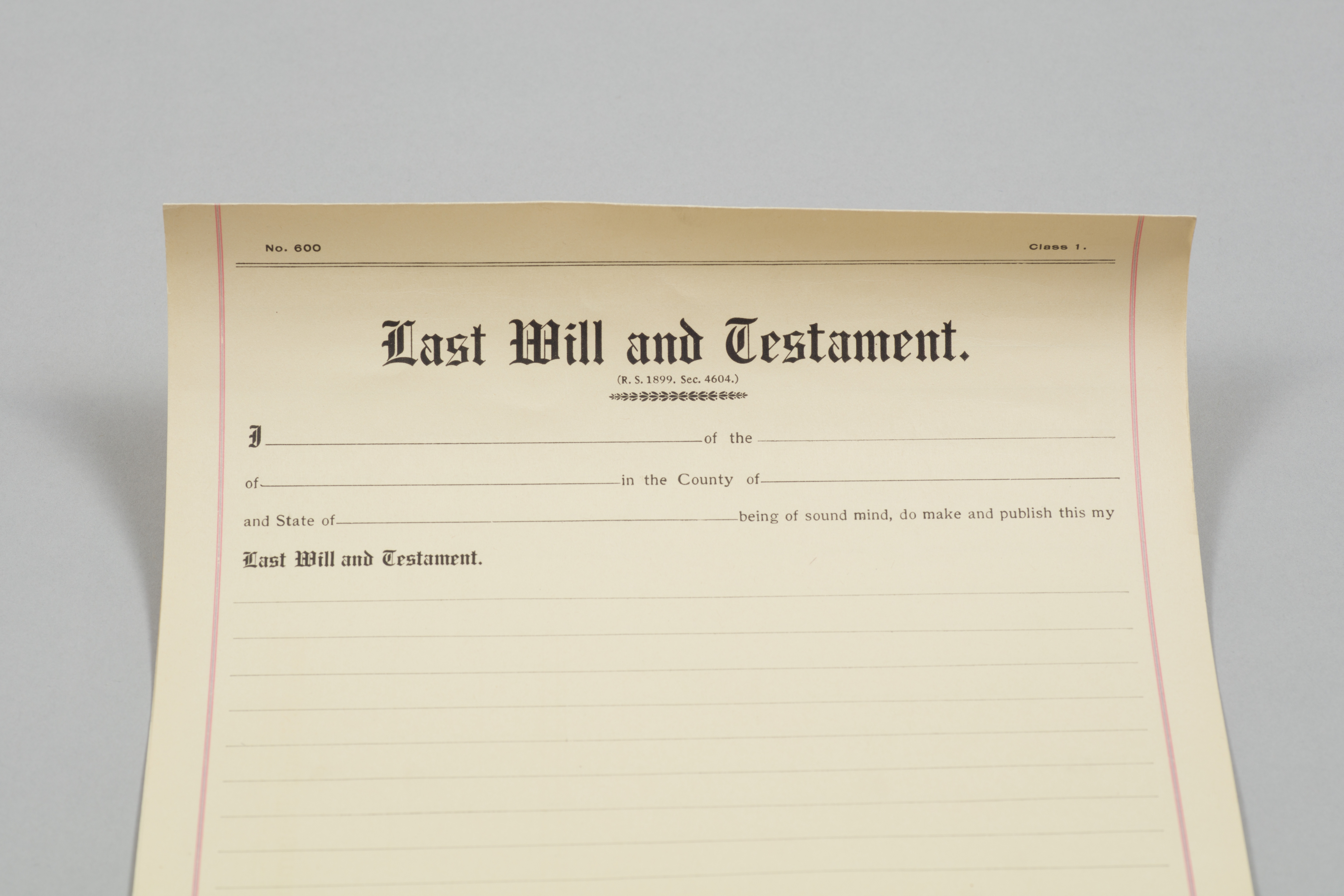
Forms using the legal doublet “will and testament”

A legal doublet is a standardized phrase used frequently in English legal language consisting of two or more words that are irreversible binomials and frequently synonyms, usually connected by and, such as cease and desist.

The doubling—and sometimes even tripling—often originates in the transition from use of one language for legal purposes to another. Situations include in Britain, where a native English term is joined to a Latin or Law French term, and in Romance-speaking countries, where a Latin term is joined to the vernacular. To ensure understanding, the terms from both languages were retained and used together. This reflected the interactions between Germanic and Roman law following the decline of the Roman Empire. These phrases are often pleonasms and form irreversible binomials. The order of the words cannot be reversed, as it would be seen as particularly unusual to ask someone to desist and cease or to have property owned clear and free rather than the standard free and clear term.

A legal doublet gives the name to the United States House Committee on Ways and Means

In other cases the two components have differences which are subtle, appreciable only to lawyers, or obsolete. For example, ways and means, referring to methods and resources respectively, are differentiable, in the same way that tools and materials, or equipment and funds, are differentiable—but the difference between them is often practically irrelevant to the contexts in which the irreversible binomial ways and means is used today in non-legal contexts as a mere cliché.

Doublets may also have arisen or persisted because the solicitors and clerks who drew up conveyances and other documents were paid by the word, which tended to encourage verbosity.

Their habitual use has been decried by some legal scholars as "redundant" and "superfluous" in modern legal briefs.

== List of common legal doublets ==
- accord and satisfaction
- acknowledge and confess
- aid and abet
- all and sundry
- alter or change
- amity and commerce
- appropriate and proper
- arbitrary and capricious
- art and part
- as and when
- bind and obligate
- breaking and entering
- butts and bounds
- by and between
- can and will
- care and attention
- cease and desist
- confidence and supply
- covenant and agree
- cruel and unusual
- deem and consider
- demise and lease
- depose and say
- drunk and disorderly
- due and payable
- expressed or implied
- facts and circumstances
- final and conclusive
- fit and proper
- for all intents and purposes
- for and on behalf of
- foul and abusive language
- free and clear
- from now and henceforth
- full faith and credit
- furnish and supply
- goods and chattels
- have and hold
- heirs and successors
- high crimes and misdemeanors
- hue and cry
- indemnify and hold harmless
- infangthief and outfangthief
- information and belief
- keep and perform
- kind and nature
- law and order
- legal and valid
- let or hindrance
- lewd and lascivious conduct
- liens and encumbrances
- make and enter into
- marque and reprisal
- metes and bounds
- mind and memory
- mines and minerals
- null and void
- over and above
- oyer and terminer
- pains and penalties
- part and parcel
- perform and discharge
- plain and ordinary
- power and authority
- sac and soc
- renounce and abjure
- representations and warranties
- reside or be found
- rules and regulations
- sale or transfer
- signed and sealed
- sole and exclusive
- successors and assigns
- terms and conditions
- then and in that event
- toll and team
- true and correct
- use and wont
- waif and stray
- ways and means
- wear and tear
- will and testament

== List of common legal triplets ==
- arbitrary, capricious and unreasonable
- cancel, annul and set aside
- convey, transfer and set over
- give, devise and bequeath
- grant, bargain and sell
- name, constitute and appoint
- null, void and of no effect
- tamper with, damage, or destroy
- ordered, adjudged and decreed
- peace, amity and commerce
- remise, release and forever quit claim
- rest, residue and remainder
- right, title and interest
- signed, sealed and delivered
- to all intents, constructions and purposes
- way, shape or form

== See also ==
- Antanaclasis – Type of pun
- Cognate object
- Figura etymologica – Rhetorical figure
- Hendiadys – Conjunction for emphasis
- Legal English – English as used in legal matters
- Merism – Synecdochic figure of speech
- Polyptoton – Stylistic device
