= Movers and shakers =

Movers and Shakers may refer to:

- "movers and shakers", a phrase from the 1874 poem "Ode" by Arthur O'Shaughnessy; origin of the idiom
- Movers & Shakers (film), a 1985 American comedy film
- Movers & Shakers (TV series), a 1997–2012 Indian talk show hosted by Shekhar Suman
