= Horseshoes and Handgrenades =

"Close only counts in horseshoes and hand grenades" is a common idiom.

Horseshoes and Handgrenades may refer to:

- Horseshoes & Handgrenades (Disciple album), 2010
- Horseshoes and Hand Grenades (Chris Mars album), 1992
- "Horseshoes and Handgrenades", a song by Green Day from their 2009 album 21st Century Breakdown
