= Adnomination =

Repetition of words with the same root word

Adnomination is the repetition of words with the same root word.

== Example ==
News is what somebody, somewhere wants to suppress; all the rest is advertising.

— Journalistic saying
