= Attestation clause =

In statutory law, a type of clause found in wills

In the statutory law of wills and trusts, an attestation clause is a clause that is typically appended to a will, often just below the place of the testator's signature. It is often of the form signed, sealed, published, and declared, a legal quadruplet.

== United States ==
In the United States, attestation clauses were formally introduced into probate law with the promulgation of the first version of the Model Probate Code in the 1940s. Statutes that authorize self-proved wills typically provide that a will that contains this language will be admitted to probate without affidavits from the attesting witnesses.

An attestation clause modeled on the Model Probate Code's language might provide:

We, the undersigned testator and the undersigned witnesses, respectively, whose names are signed to the attached or foregoing instrument declare:

(1) that the testator executed the instrument as the testator's will;
(2) that, in the presence of both witnesses, the testator signed or acknowledged the signature already made or directed another to sign for the testator in the testator's presence;
(3) that the testator executed the will as a free and voluntary act for the purposes expressed in it;
(4) that each of the witnesses, in the presence of the testator and of each other, signed the will as a witness;
(5) that the testator was of sound mind when the will was executed; and
(6) that to the best knowledge of each of the witnesses the testator was, at the time the will was executed, at least eighteen (18) years of age or was a member of the armed forces or of the merchant marine of the United States or its allies.

The validity and form of an attestation clause is usually a matter of U.S. state law, and will vary from state to state. Many states allow attestation clauses to be added as codicils to wills that were originally drafted without them.

== Other uses ==
Often synonymical with witness, an attestation "testifies to the accuracy or authenticity of something". Thomson Reuters define an attestation clause as where "a document has been executed in the presence of one or more witnesses (who attest the execution)".

== See also ==
- Affidavit
- Police oath
- Testator
- Testimony
