= Sacrifice of Abraham =

The Sacrifice of Abraham may be:

- Binding of Isaac
- Eid al-Adha
