= Signed Sealed Delivered =

Signed Sealed Delivered may refer to:

- "Signed Sealed and Delivered" (song), a 1948 song by Cowboy Copas later covered by James Brown
- Signed, Sealed & Delivered (album), a 1970 album by Stevie Wonder
  - "Signed, Sealed, Delivered I'm Yours", a 1970 song from the Stevie Wonder album
- Signed Sealed Delivered (album), a 2010 album by Craig David
- Signed, Sealed, Delivered (TV series), an American television series airing on the Hallmark Channel
- "Signed, Sealed, Delivered" (CSI: Vegas), a 2021 television episode
- Signed, Sealed & Delivered, a 2011 mixtape by K. Michelle
- "Signed, Sealed, Delivered", a storyline in the science fiction comedy webtoon series Live with Yourself!
