= Cloak and dagger =

Idiom describing activities of espionage and subversion

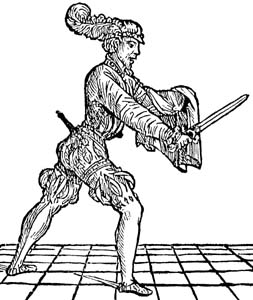
Achille Marozzo's 16th century manual of arms illustration of the Dagger and Cloak

"Cloak and dagger" was a fighting style common by the time of the Renaissance involving a knife hidden beneath a cloak. The term later came into use as a metaphor, referring to situations involving intrigue, secrecy, espionage, or mystery.

== Overview ==
The earliest written use of the phrase can be attributed to English poet Geoffrey Chaucer in "The Knight's Tale", published around 1400.

The metaphorical meaning of the phrase dates from the early 19th century. It is a translation from the French de cape et d'épée and Spanish de capa y espada ("of cloak and sword"). These phrases referred to a genre of swashbuckler drama in which the main characters wore these items. In 1840, Henry Wadsworth Longfellow wrote, "In the afternoon read La Dama Duende of Calderón – a very good comedy of 'cloak and sword'." Charles Dickens subsequently used the phrase "cloak and dagger" in his work Barnaby Rudge a year later as a sarcastic reference to this style of drama.

The imagery of the two items became associated with the archetypal spy or assassin: the cloak, worn to hide one's identity or remain hidden from view, and the dagger, a concealable and silent weapon.
