= Information and belief =

Legal term

In the law, especially in legal pleadings, the phrase information and belief identifies a statement that is made, not from firsthand knowledge, but "based on secondhand information that the declarant believes is true".

The phrase is often used in legal pleadings, declarations under penalty of perjury, and affidavits under oath. It is often used in a phrase similar to: "The plaintiff is informed and believes, and upon such information and belief alleges". This "protects the maker of the statement from claims of outright falsehood or perjury".
