= Tall, dark and handsome =

Phrase that refers to an appealing man

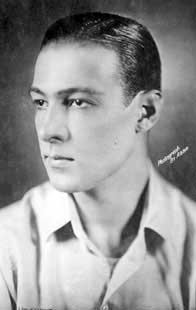
Rudolph Valentino in 1919. Valentino was a popular target of the term in early American film press.

"Tall, dark, and handsome" is a phrase that refers to an appealing man. It may have originated from romantic fiction produced circa 1910.

== History and interpretation ==
According to British lexicographer Eric Partridge, the phrase "tall, dark and handsome" originates from fiction novels produced in the early 20th century. The term was commonly used in Hollywood during the 1920s to describe Rudolph Valentino. As an idiom it is both lexically and sequentially fixed. Alan Axelrod writes that "tall, dark and handsome" is often assumed as a compliment, but notes that Eric Partridge wrote that it is actually a mild insult, given the term originates from cheap and cheesy novels from the 1910s; making it an ironic phrase.

== Studies ==
David Puts is an associate professor of anthropology at Pennsylvania State University who has studied the evolutionary bases of human sexuality. In 2017 he was asked if "tall, dark and handsome" is universally attractive in the human experience and he stated that not enough cross-cultural work had been conducted to be very confident in the concept's scientific validity.

In 2023, Don Doxsie wrote that "tall dark and handsome" is essentially a myth, and that the only attribute that is consistently desired is handsomeness. In India, "darkness" is basically erased from the phrase, as only tall, light and handsome men are considered attractive. According to Fluehr-Lobban, the phrase really emphasizes height, because a "short, dark and handsome" man would not be considered appealing.

== Examples ==
In the 2010s, Bollywood actors Ranveer Singh, Randeep Hooda, and Arjun Kapoor were described by the phrase in the Indian media.

Model David Gandy has often been called tall, dark and handsome in the media. The New Zealand Herald described further that "At 191 cm [6 ft 3 in], he's taller than most models and up close – with his dark, almost black hair and bronzed olive complexion – he's like a live version of Michelangelo's Statue of David."

== See also ==
- Average height around the world
- Bad boy archetype
- Height discrimination
- Latin lover
- Physical attractiveness
