= David and Goliath (Titian) =

Painting by Titian

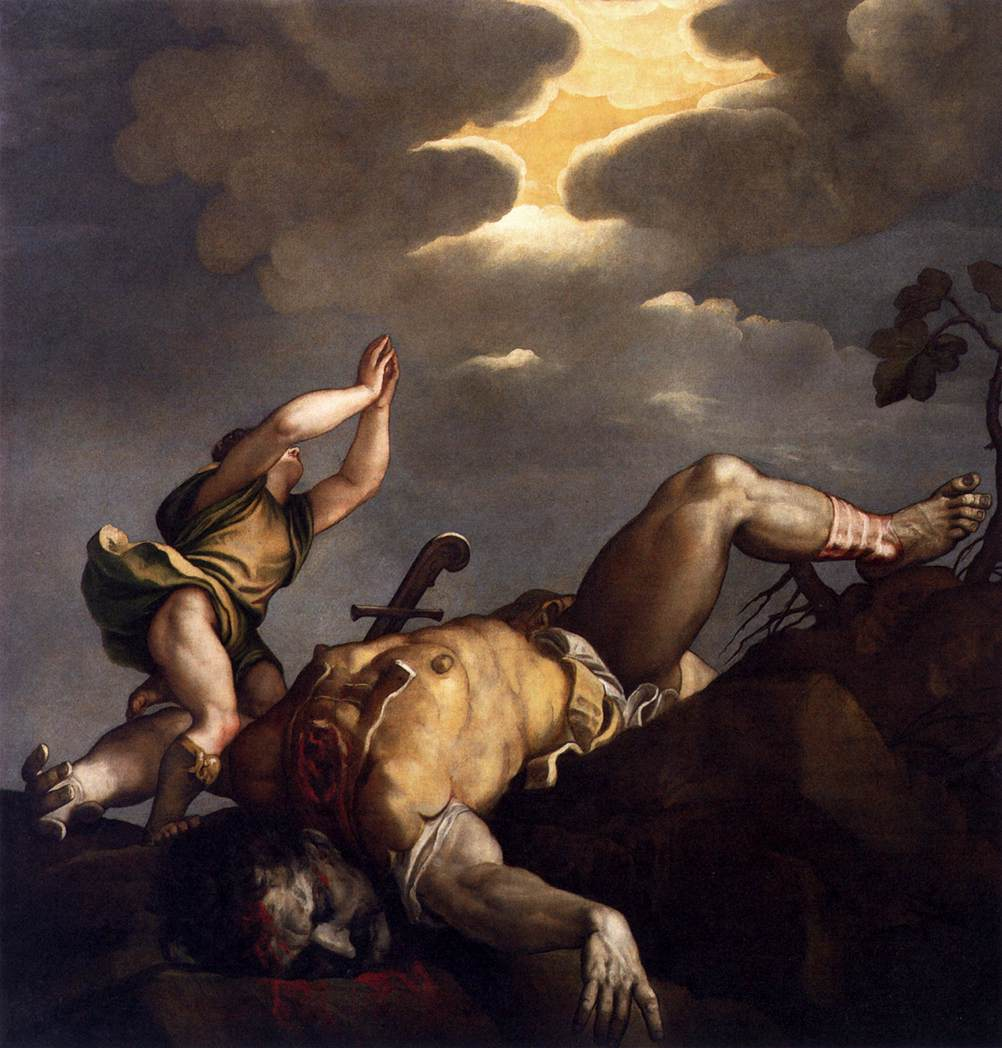
- Artist: Titian
- Year: c. 1542–1544
- Medium: oil on canvas
- Dimensions: 300 cm × 285 cm (120 in × 112 in)
- Location: Santa Maria della Salute; Venice

David and Goliath (Italian: Davide e Golia) is an oil painting by the Venetian painter Titian. It was made in about 1542–1544 for the church of Santo Spirito, but is now in the basilica of Santa Maria della Salute.

== Subject ==
The Philistines had come up to make war against Saul and, as the rival camps lay opposite each other, the warrior Goliath came forth day by day to challenge to single combat. Only David ventured to respond, and armed with a sling and pebbles he overcame Goliath. The Philistines, seeing their champion killed, lost heart and were easily put to flight. The giant's arms were placed in the sanctuary, and it was his famous sword which David took with him in his flight from Saul.

== History ==
It was about the beginning of the 1540s that Titian received commissions for a great number of pictures from the brothers of Santo Spirito, who possessed the work of his early career, the San Marco Enthroned. One altarpiece represented the Descent of the Holy Spirit, but having been damaged had to be restored later by Titian. The picture on the same subject, which is now in the Church of the Salute, belongs to another period in Titian's activity. The whole collection of art treasures from Santo Spirito was transported to the Church of the Salute in the seventeenth century, where they remain today.

In the ceiling of the sacristy of the Salute, above the altar, are three creations of this period (c. 1543–1544): Cain and Abel, Abraham and Isaac, and David and Goliath.

== Analysis ==
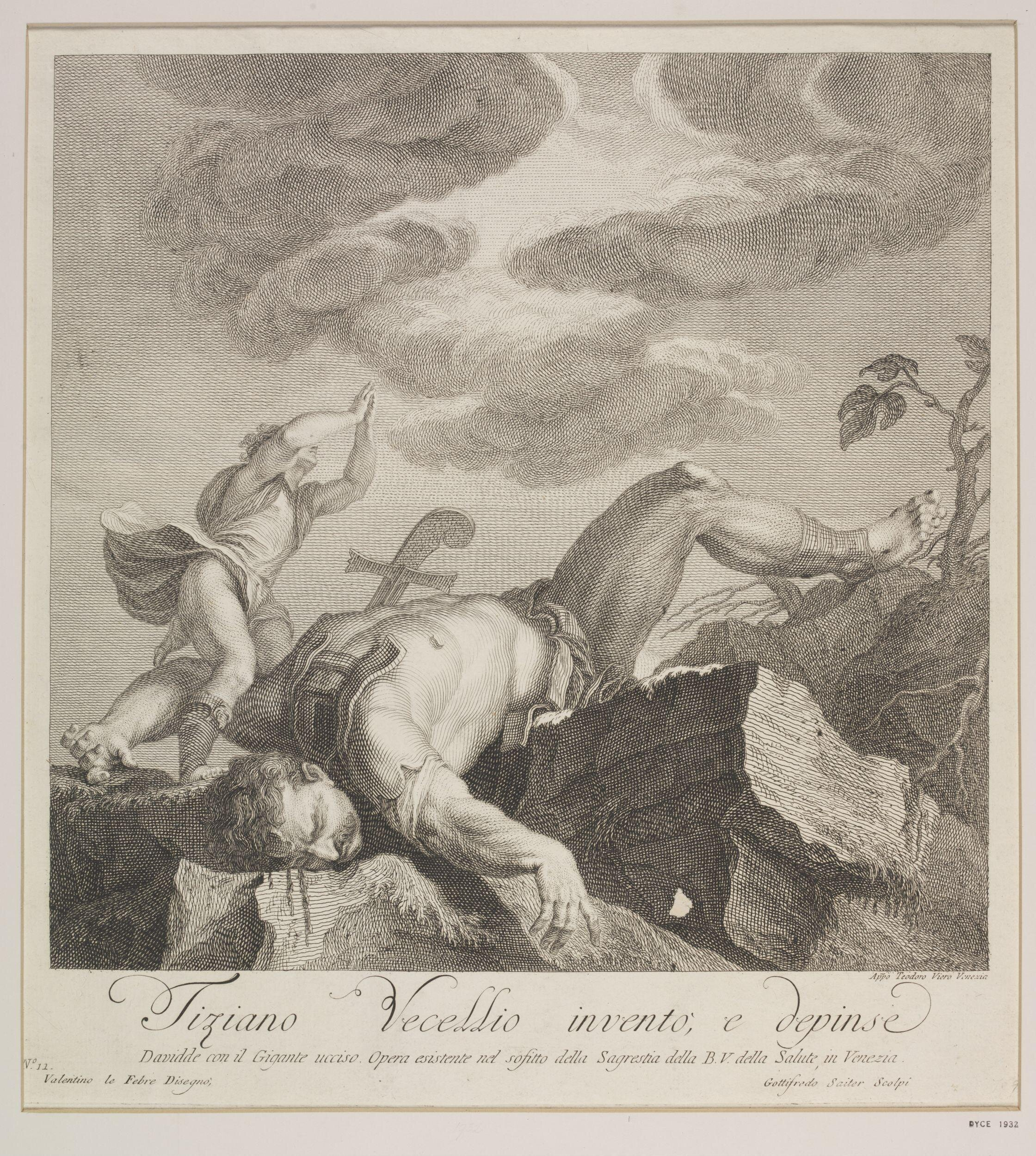
Print by Johann Gottfried Seutter (1725–1800)

Georg Gronau writes of these three pictures collectively:

We shall easily perceive the connection between these subjects; all are scenes fitted to display passionate movement, and in each there are only a few—two or three—figures. Talent and temperament alike urged the artist to choose these themes; his artistic insight prompted him to limit the number of the figures for the sake of simplicity of design—unless, indeed, his patrons had themselves suggested the subjects. The surroundings are almost the same in all three pictures—brown soil, rocky cliffs; we feel ourselves transported to mountain heights; above and behind the figures the sky is gloomy and heavy with clouds. From this background stand out in strong relief the colossal human forms, brownish-yellow in colour. Here we see a falling man still trying to defend himself feebly with one arm; over him about to renew the blow is Cain, with his foot on his victim. There we see the tall, erect form of Abraham in twofold action—his left- hand rests on the neck of the boy who is kneeling on the pile of wood, his right hand brandishes the sacrificial knife, and at the same time he turns right round to the angel who has stayed his movement, light across the whole of the third picture lies aslant the body of the giant; over him stands the boy David, who raises his arms in gratitude to Heaven; a ray of sunshine breaks through the heavy clouds.

For grandeur of conception Titian here—if anywhere—approaches Michelangelo. These human beings, with their great strength of muscle and their heroic action, are called into existence by his power as a draughtsman; but the scheme of colour is peculiar to himself; we notice how the predominating sombre tint puts together the strong local colours, and how the composition in colour contributes not less than the composition in line to produce a solid effect of powerful life. ... In the composition commemorating David's victory, the outstretched body of Goliath supplies the strongest mass of colour; the light from above seems almost solid as it touches the boy's upraised arms.

Additionally, art historian Madlyn Kahr notes that while many artists have depicted David beheading Goliath, raising his head in victory, or showing him with Goliath's gigantic head on the ground, Titian is the only one who portrays David praying after defeating the giant. Kahr argues that the key to interpreting this unprecedented scene in art lies in the importance of the sword in Titian's painting which David is dedicating to God in an act of consecration.

== See also ==
- List of works by Titian
- David and Goliath (Caravaggio)
- David and Goliath (Gentileschi)

== Sources ==
- Biadene, Susanna, ed. (1990). "Ceiling of the Church of Santo Spirito in Isola". Translated by Hecker, Sharon; Rylands, Philip; Wilkins, Elizabeth. In Titian: Prince of Painters. Italy: Prestel. pp. 255–56.
- Chisholm, Hugh, ed. (1911). "Goliath". Encyclopædia Britannica. Vol. 12 (11th ed.). Cambridge University Press. p. 225.
- Gronau, Georg (1904). Titian. London: Duckworth and Co; New York: Charles Scribner's Sons. pp. 123–25, 300.
- Kahr, Madlyn (1966). "Titian's Old Testament Cycle". Journal of the Warburg and Courtauld Institutes, 29: pp. 193–205.
- Ricketts, Charles (1910). Titian. London: Methuen & Co. Ltd. pp. 102, 103.
