= Abraham and Isaac (Titian) =

Painting by Titian

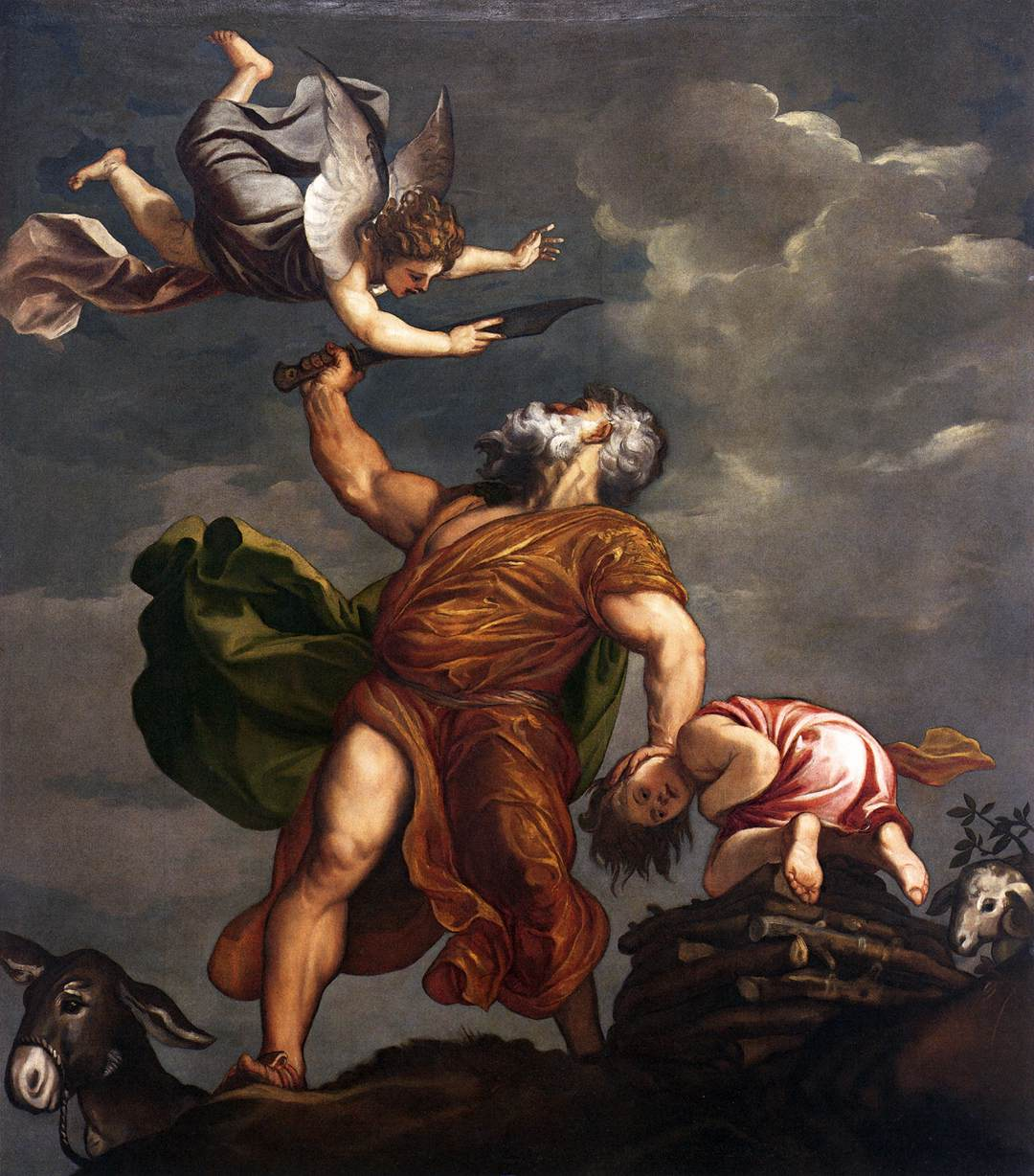
- Artist: Titian
- Year: c. 1542–1544
- Medium: oil on canvas
- Dimensions: 328 cm × 285 cm (129 in × 112 in)
- Location: Santa Maria della Salute; Venice

Abraham and Isaac, also known as the Sacrifice of Isaac (Italian: Sacrificio di Isacco), is an oil painting by the Venetian painter Titian. It was made in about 1543–1544 for the church of Santo Spirito, but is now in the basilica of Santa Maria della Salute.

== Subject ==
Abraham was commanded by God to offer up Isaac as a human sacrifice in the land of Moriah. Proceeding to obey, he was prevented by an angel as he was about to sacrifice his son, and slew a ram which he found on the spot. As a reward for his obedience he received another promise of a numerous seed and abundant prosperity.

== History ==
It was about the beginning of the 1540s that Titian received commissions for a great number of pictures from the brothers of the church of Santo Spirito, who possessed the work of his early career, the San Marco Enthroned. One altarpiece represented the Descent of the Holy Spirit, but having been damaged had to be restored later by Titian. The picture on the same subject, which is now in the Church of the Salute, belongs to another period in Titian's activity. The whole collection of art treasures from Santo Spirito was transported to the Church of the Salute in the seventeenth century, where they remain today.

In the ceiling of the sacristy of the Salute, above the altar, are three creations of this period (c. 1543–1544): Cain and Abel, Abraham and Isaac, and David and Goliath.

== Analysis ==
Georg Gronau writes of these three pictures collectively:

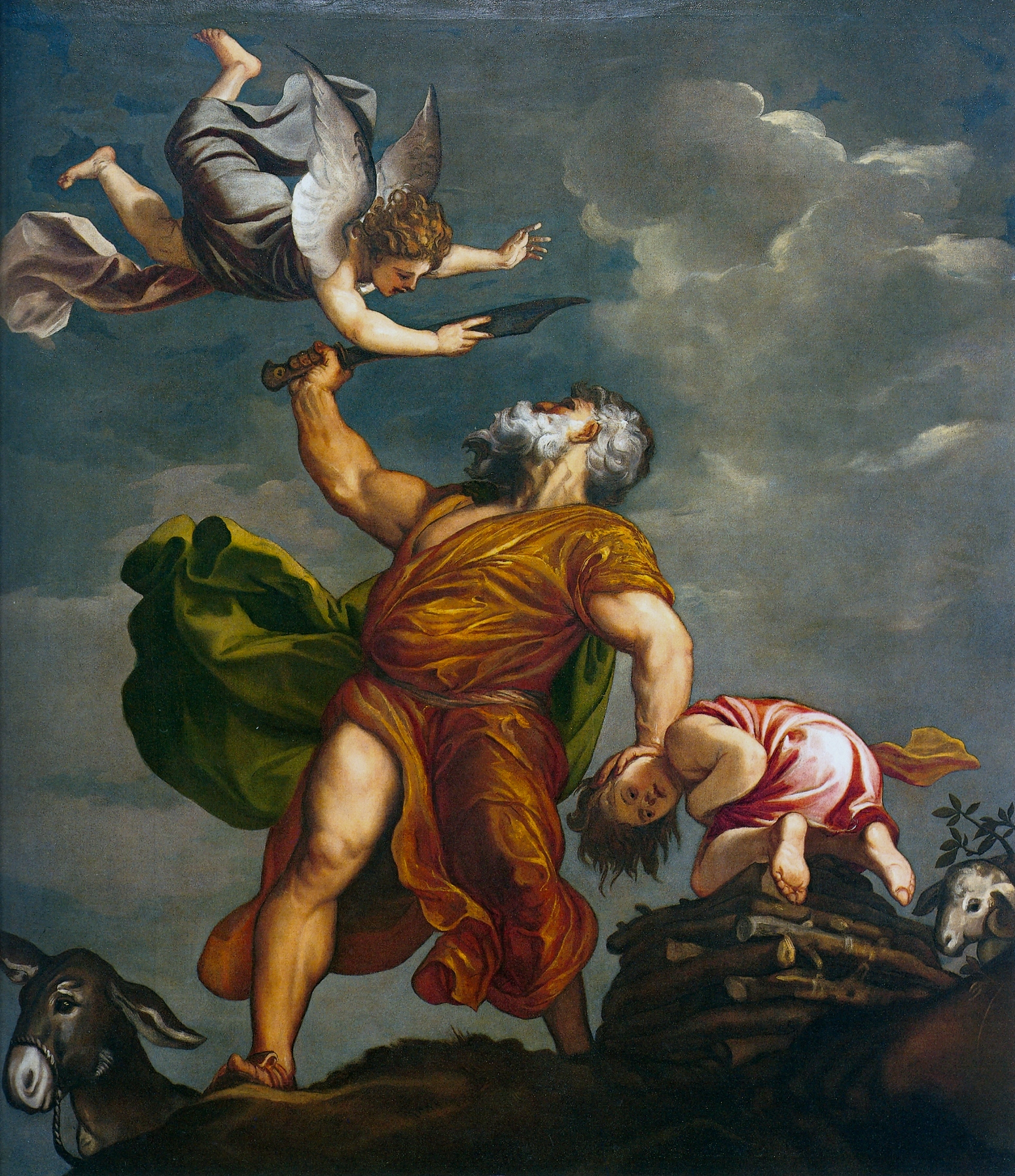
Sacrifice of Isaac (1542–1544)

We shall easily perceive the connection between these subjects; all are scenes fitted to display passionate movement, and in each there are only a few—two or three—figures. Talent and temperament alike urged the artist to choose these themes; his artistic insight prompted him to limit the number of the figures for the sake of simplicity of design—unless, indeed, his patrons had themselves suggested the subjects. The surroundings are almost the same in all three pictures—brown soil, rocky cliffs; we feel ourselves transported to mountain heights; above and behind the figures the sky is gloomy and heavy with clouds. From this background stand out in strong relief the colossal human forms, brownish-yellow in colour. Here we see a falling man still trying to defend himself feebly with one arm; over him about to renew the blow is Cain, with his foot on his victim. There we see the tall, erect form of Abraham in twofold action—his left- hand rests on the neck of the boy who is kneeling on the pile of wood, his right hand brandishes the sacrificial knife, and at the same time he turns right round to the angel who has stayed his movement, light across the whole of the third picture lies aslant the body of the giant; over him stands the boy David, who raises his arms in gratitude to Heaven; a ray of sunshine breaks through the heavy clouds.

For grandeur of conception Titian here—if anywhere—approaches Michelangelo. These human beings, with their great strength of muscle and their heroic action, are called into existence by his power as a draughtsman; but the scheme of colour is peculiar to himself; we notice how the predominating sombre tint puts together the strong local colours, and how the composition in colour contributes not less than the composition in line to produce a solid effect of powerful life. … [T]he "Sacrifice of Isaac"—the Divine reward of unquestioning faith—is brightened by changeful lights, which shine on the edges of the clouds and blend together the central point—Abraham's robe, of deep orange colour—with the reddish-violet to the right and the grey-blue in the left-hand comer.

== Gallery ==
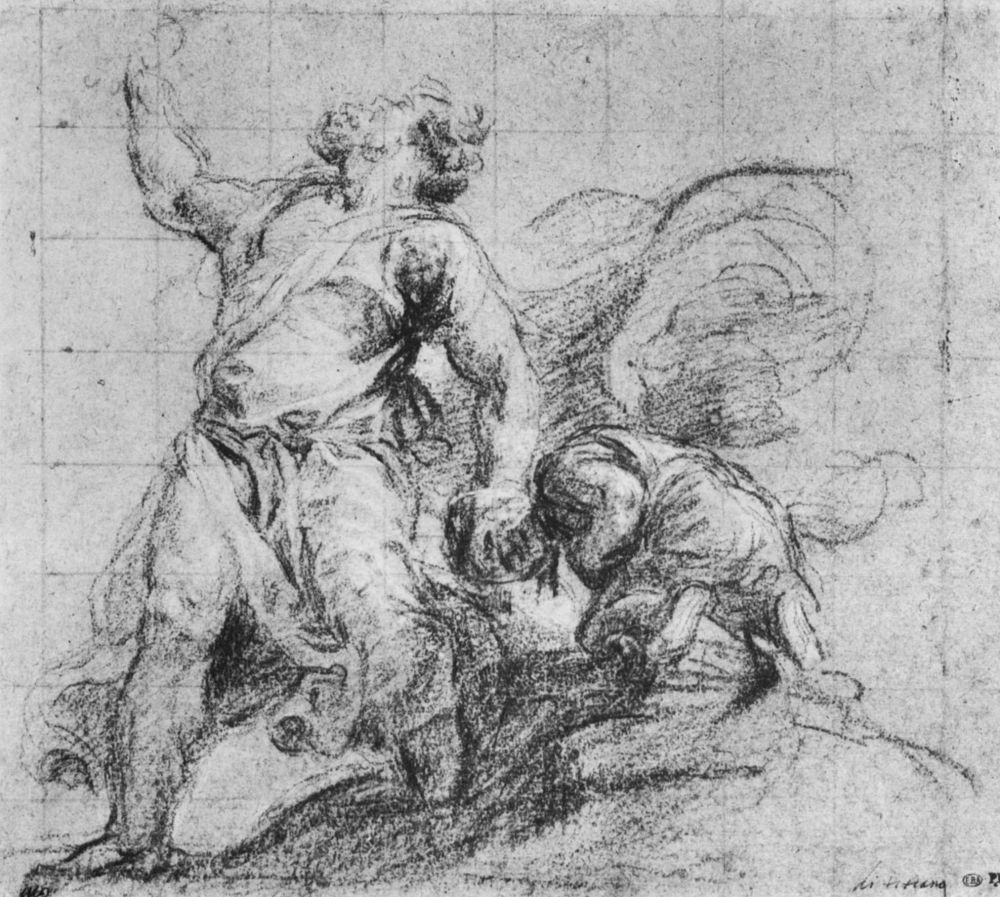
Chalk drawing by Titian (c. 1544)

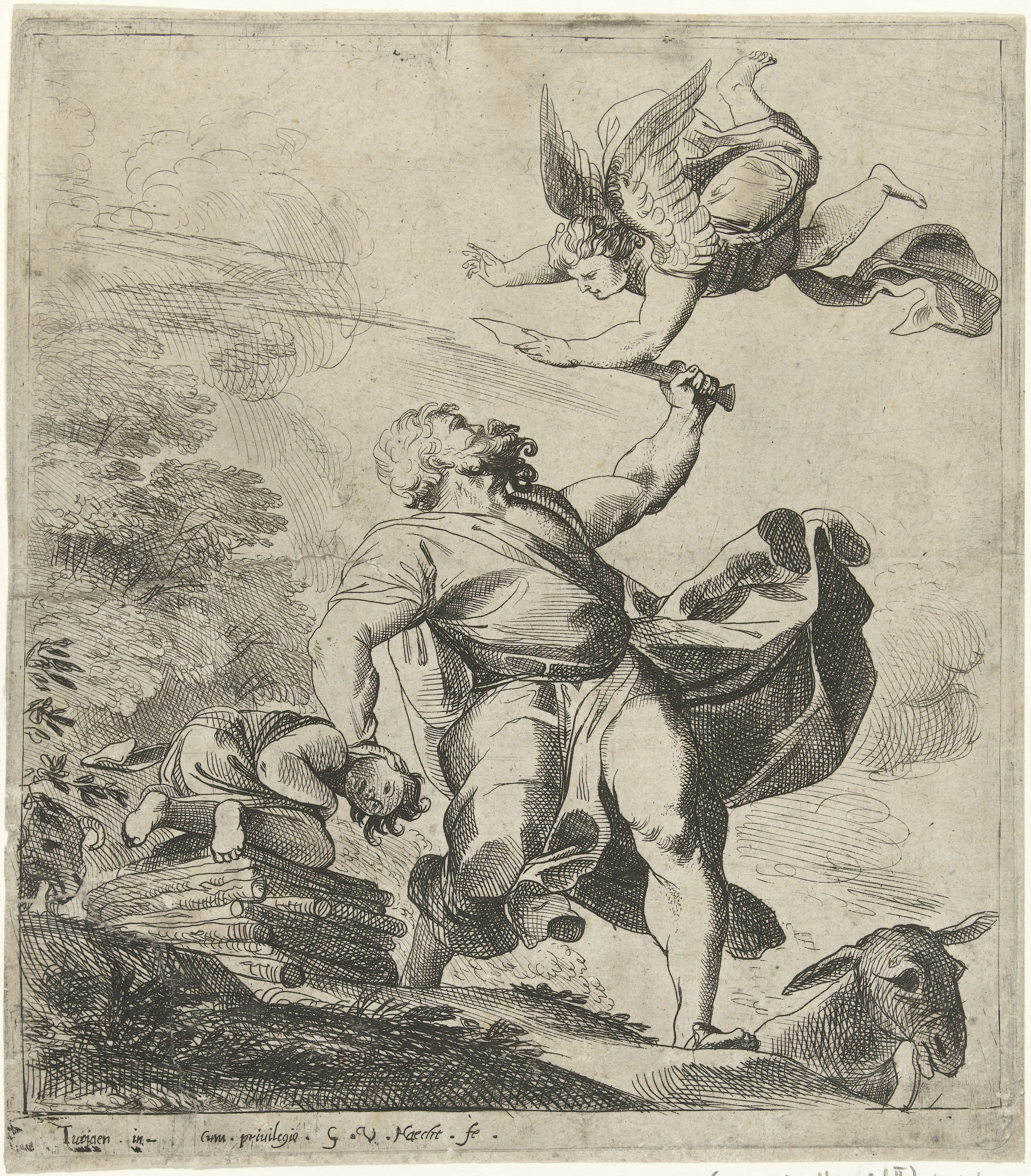
Print by Willem van Haecht II (1603–1637)

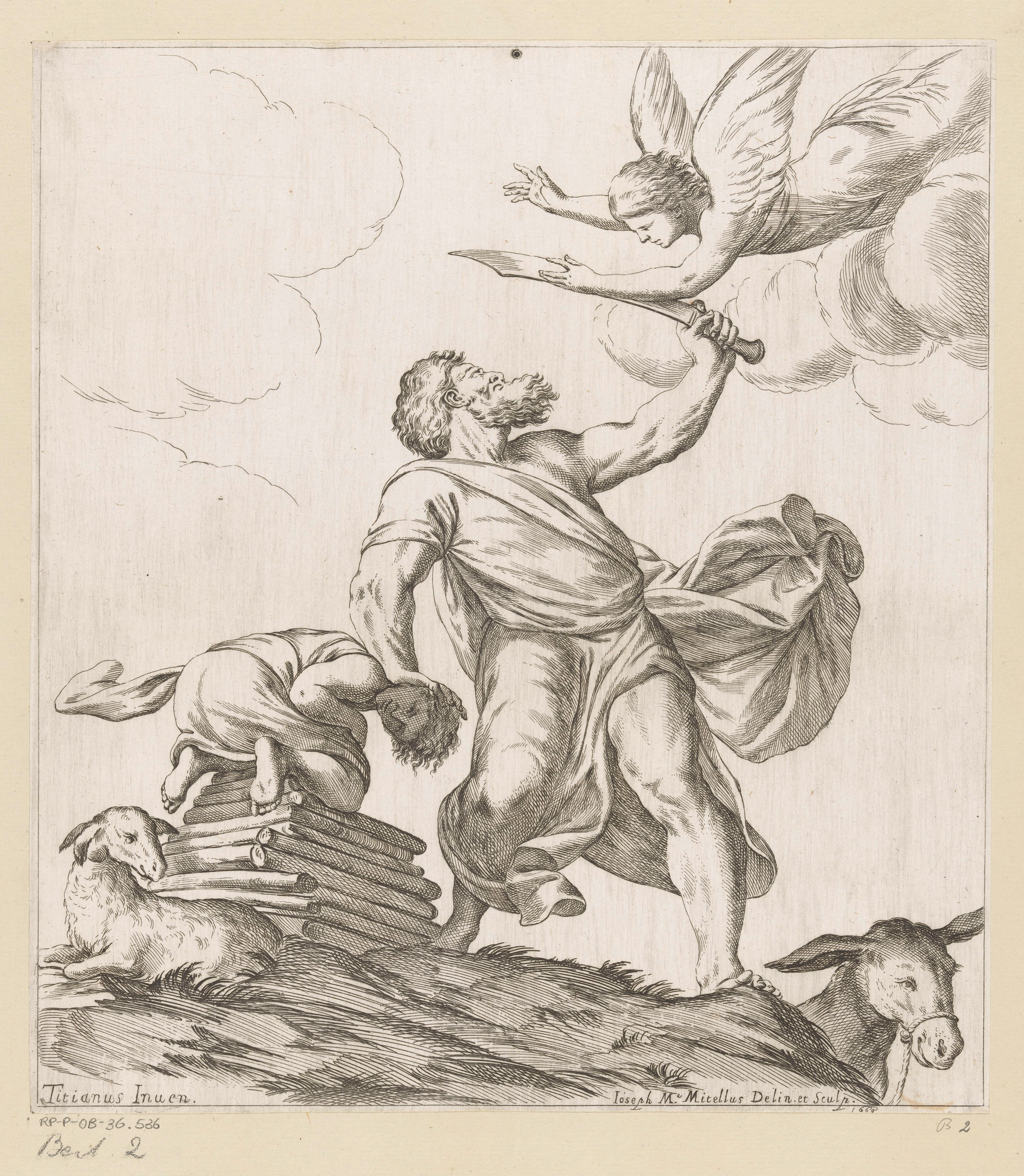
Print by Giuseppe Maria Mitelli (1668)

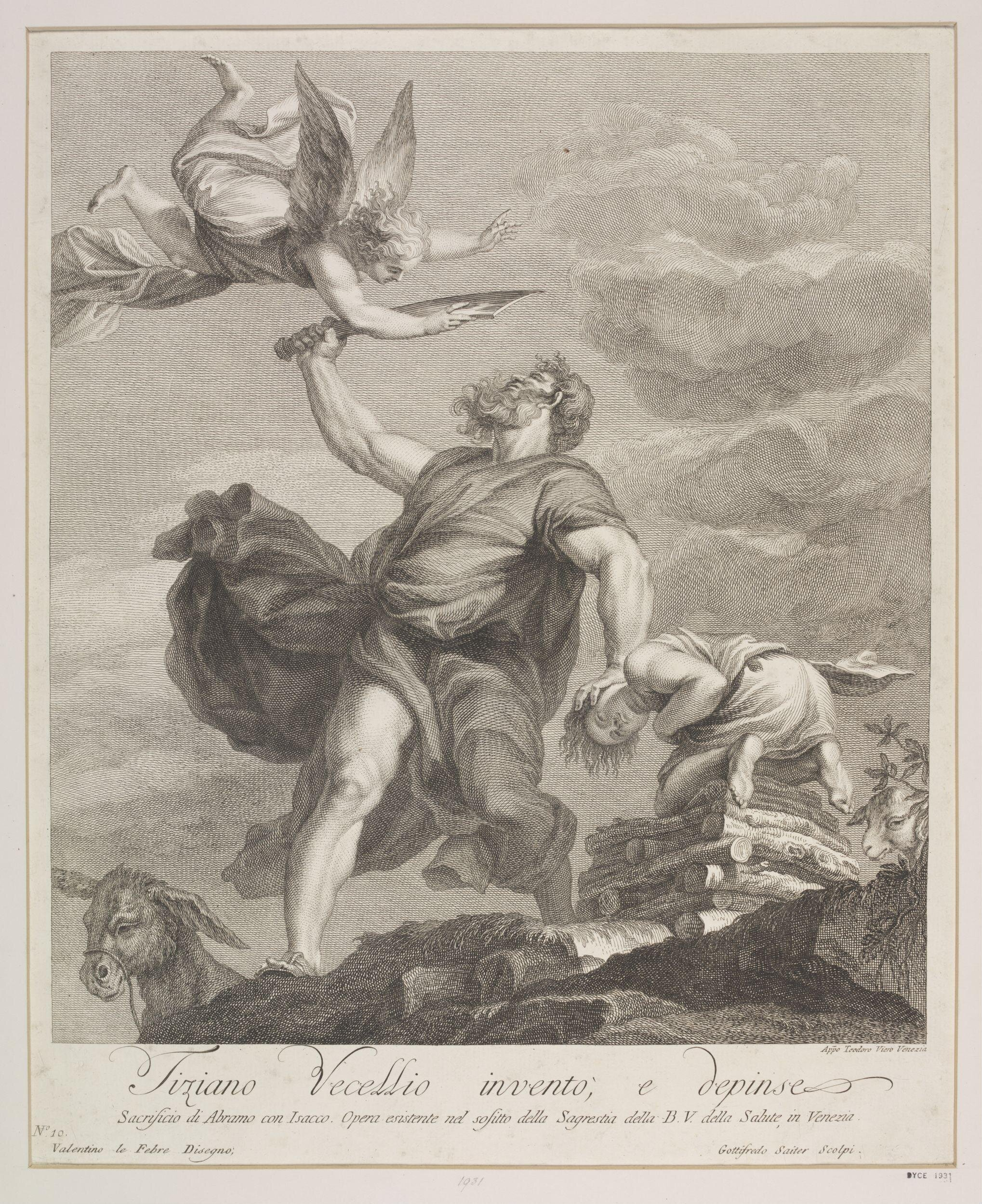
Print by Johann Gottfried Seutter (1725−1800)

== See also ==
- List of works by Titian
- Sacrifice of Isaac (disambiguation), for depictions of the same subject by other artists

== Sources ==
- Biadene, Susanna, ed. (1990). "Ceiling of the Church of Santo Spirito in Isola". Translated by Hecker, Sharon; Rylands, Philip; Wilkins, Elizabeth. In Titian: Prince of Painters. Italy: Prestel. pp. 255–58.
- Cook, Stanley Arthur (1911). "Abraham". In Chisholm, Hugh (ed.). Encyclopædia Britannica. Vol. 1 (11th ed.). Cambridge University Press. pp. 69–72.
- Gronau, Georg (1904). Titian. London: Duckworth and Co; New York: Charles Scribner's Sons. pp. 123–25, 300.
- Kahr, Madlyn (1966). "Titian's Old Testament Cycle". Journal of the Warburg and Courtauld Institutes, 29: pp. 193–205.
- Ricketts, Charles (1910). Titian. London: Methuen & Co. Ltd. pp. 102, 103.
