= Santa Maria della Salute =

Basilica di Santa Maria della Salute Basilica of Saint Mary of Health
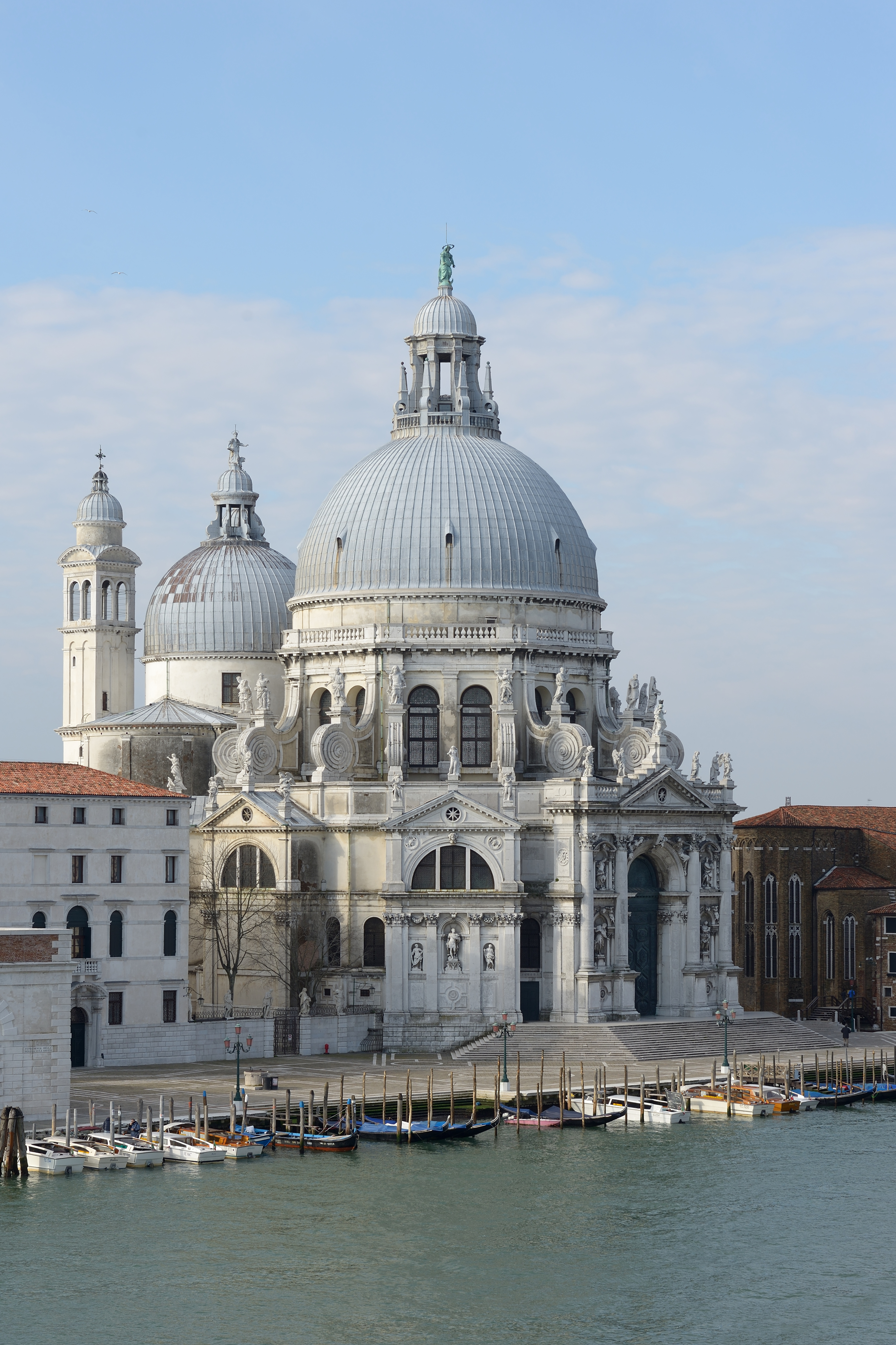
- Santa Maria della Salute at the Grand Canal
- Click the map for an interactive, fullscreen view.
- 45°25′51″N 12°20′04″E
- Location: Venice
- Country: Italy
- Denomination: Roman Catholic

History
- Status: Active
- Consecrated: 1681

Architecture
- Architect: Baldassare Longhena
- Architectural type: Church
- Style: Baroque
- Groundbreaking: 1631
- Completed: 1687

Specifications
- Length: 70 metres (230 ft)
- Width: 47 metres (154 ft)
- Materials: Istrian stone, marmorino

Administration
- Province: Archdiocese of Venice

Santa Maria della Salute (English: Saint Mary of Health; Venetian: Bazéłega de Santa Maria de ła Sałute), commonly known simply as La Salute (Italian: [la saˈluːte]), is a Roman Catholic church and minor basilica located at the Punta della Dogana in the Dorsoduro sestiere of the city of Venice, Italy.

It stands on the narrow finger of Punta della Dogana, between the Grand Canal and the Giudecca Canal, at the Bacino di San Marco, making the church visible when entering the Piazza San Marco from the water. The Salute is part of the parish of the Gesuati and is the most recent of the so-called plague churches.

In 1630, Venice experienced an unusually devastating outbreak of the plague. As a votive offering for the city's deliverance from the pestilence, the Republic of Venice vowed to build and dedicate a church to Our Lady of Health. The church was designed in the then fashionable Baroque style by Baldassare Longhena, who studied under the architect Vincenzo Scamozzi. Construction began in 1631. Most of the objects of art housed in the church bear references to the Black Death.

The dome of the Salute was an important addition to the Venice skyline and soon became emblematic of the city, appearing in artworks both by locals, such as Canaletto and Francesco Guardi, and visitors, such as J. M. W. Turner and John Singer Sargent.

== History ==
Beginning in the summer of 1630, a wave of the plague assaulted Venice, and until 1631 killed nearly a third of the population. In the city, 46,000 people died whilst in the lagoons the number was far higher, some 94,000. Repeated displays of the sacrament, as well as prayers and processions to churches dedicated to San Rocco and San Lorenzo Giustiniani had failed to stem the epidemic. Echoing the architectural response to a prior assault of the plague (1575–76), when Palladio was asked to design the Redentore church, the Venetian Senate on October 22, 1630, decreed that a new church would be built. It was not to be dedicated to a mere "plague" or patron saint, but to the Virgin Mary, who for many reasons was thought to be a protector of the Republic.

The end of the 1630 plague was attributed to the intercession of an icon of the Virgin Mary that was brought to Venice in 1670 by sea captain Francesco Morosini as a trophy following the peace terms obtained with the Turks in the war of Candia (present-day Crete). The icon was placed in its current position inside the basilica on 21 November, the patronal feast day.

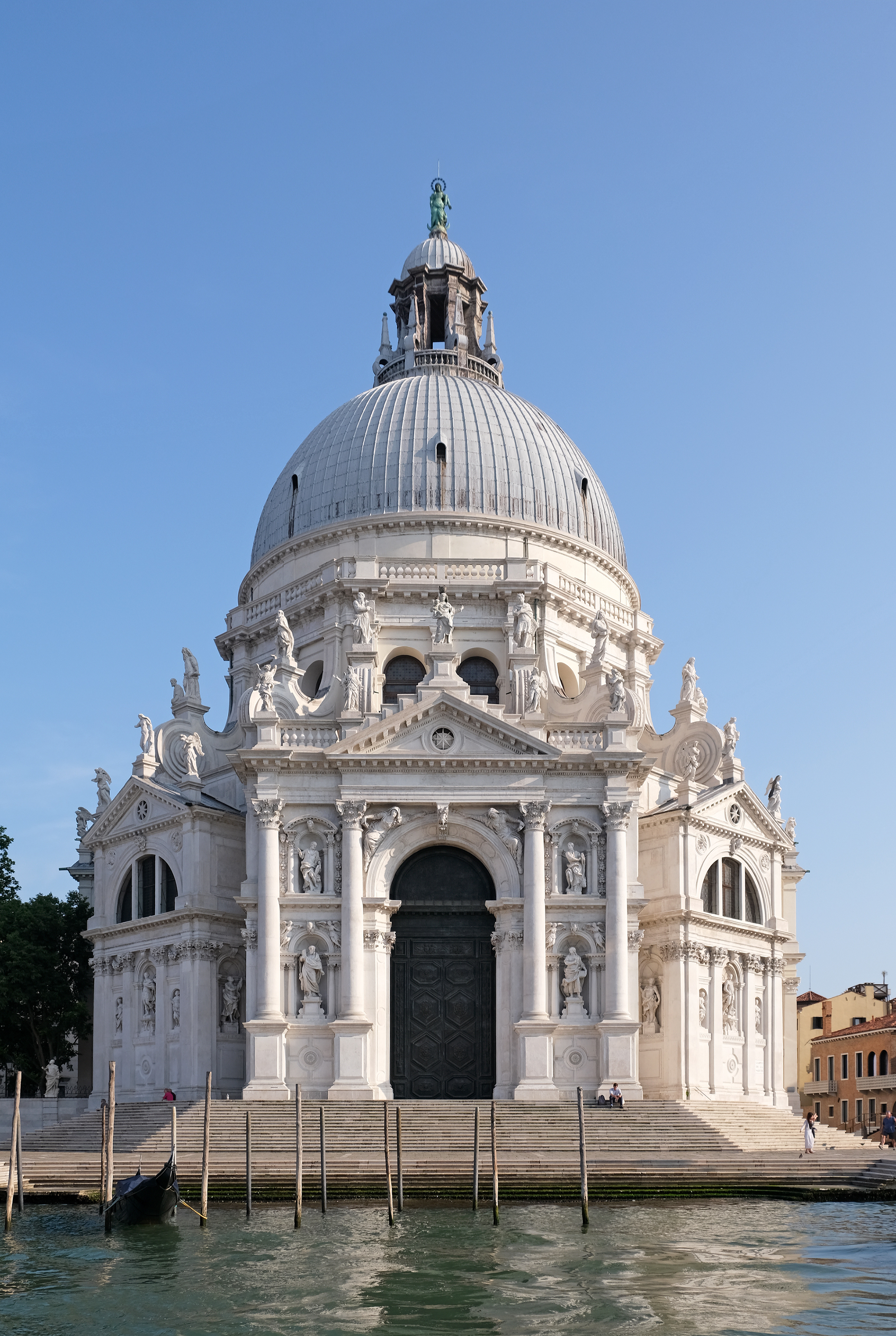
Santa Maria della Salute on the Grand Canal

Boat trip in the Grand Canal passing the Santa Maria della Salute

It was also decided that the Senate would visit the church each year. On November 21 the Feast of the Presentation of the Virgin — known as the Festa della Madonna della Salute — the city's officials parade from San Marco to the Salute, and a service in gratitude for deliverance from the plague is celebrated. This involved crossing the Grand Canal on a specially constructed pontoon bridge and is still a major event in Venice.

The desire to create a suitable monument at a place that allows for easy processional access from Piazza San Marco led senators to select the present site from among eight potential locations. The location was chosen partially due to its relationship to San Giorgio, San Marco, and Il Redentore, with which it forms an arc. The Salute, emblematic of the city's piety, stands adjacent to the rusticated single story customs house or Dogana da Mar, the emblem of its maritime commerce, and near the civic center of the city. A dispute with the patriarch, owner of the church and seminary at the site, was resolved, and razing of some of the buildings began by 1631. Likely, the diplomat Paolo Sarpi and Doge Nicolo Contarini shared the intent to link the church to an order less closely associated with the patriarchate. Ultimately the Somascan Fathers, an order founded near Bergamo by Venetian nobleman Jerome Emiliani, were invited to administer the church.

A competition was held to design the building. Of the 11 submissions (including designs by Alessandro Varotari, Matteo Ignoli, and Berteo Belli), only two were chosen for the final round. The architect Baldassare Longhena was selected to design the new church. It was finally completed in 1681, the year before Longhena's death. The other design to make it to the final round was by Antonio Smeraldi (il Fracao) and Zambattista Rubertini. Of the proposals still extant, Belli's and Smeraldi's original plans were conventional counter-reformation linear churches, resembling Palladio's Redentore and San Giorgio Maggiore, while Varotari's was a sketchy geometrical abstraction. Longhena's proposal was a concrete architectural plan, detailing the structure and costs. He wrote:

I have created a church in the form of a rotunda, a work of new invention, not built in Venice, a work very worthy and desired by many. This church, having the mystery of its dedication, being dedicated to the Blessed Virgin, made me think, with what little talent God has bestowed upon me of building the church in the ... shape of a crown.

Later in a memorandum, he wrote: "Firstly, it is a virgin work, never before seen, curious, worthy and beautiful, made in the form of a round monument that has never been seen, nor ever before invented, neither altogether, nor in part, in other churches in this most serene city, just as my competitor (il Fracao) has done for his own advantage, being poor in invention."

The Salute, while novel in many ways, still shows the influence of Palladian classicism and the domes of Venice. The Venetian Senate voted 66 in favor, 29 against with two abstentions to authorize the designs of the 26-year-old Longhena. While Longhena saw the structure as crown-like, the decorative circular building makes it seem more like a reliquary, a ciborium, and embroidered inverted chalice that shelters the city's piety.

== Exterior ==
The Salute is a vast, octagonal building with two domes and a pair of picturesque bell-towers at the back. Built on a platform made of 1,000,000 wooden piles, it is constructed of Istrian stone and marmorino (brick covered with marble dust). At the apex of the pediment stands a statue of the Virgin Mary who presides over the church which was erected in her honour. The façade is decorated with figures of Saint George, Saint Theodore, the Evangelists, the Prophets, and Judith with the head of Holofernes.

=== Façade ===
The main façade is richly decorated with statues of the four evangelists recently attributed to Tommaso Rues:

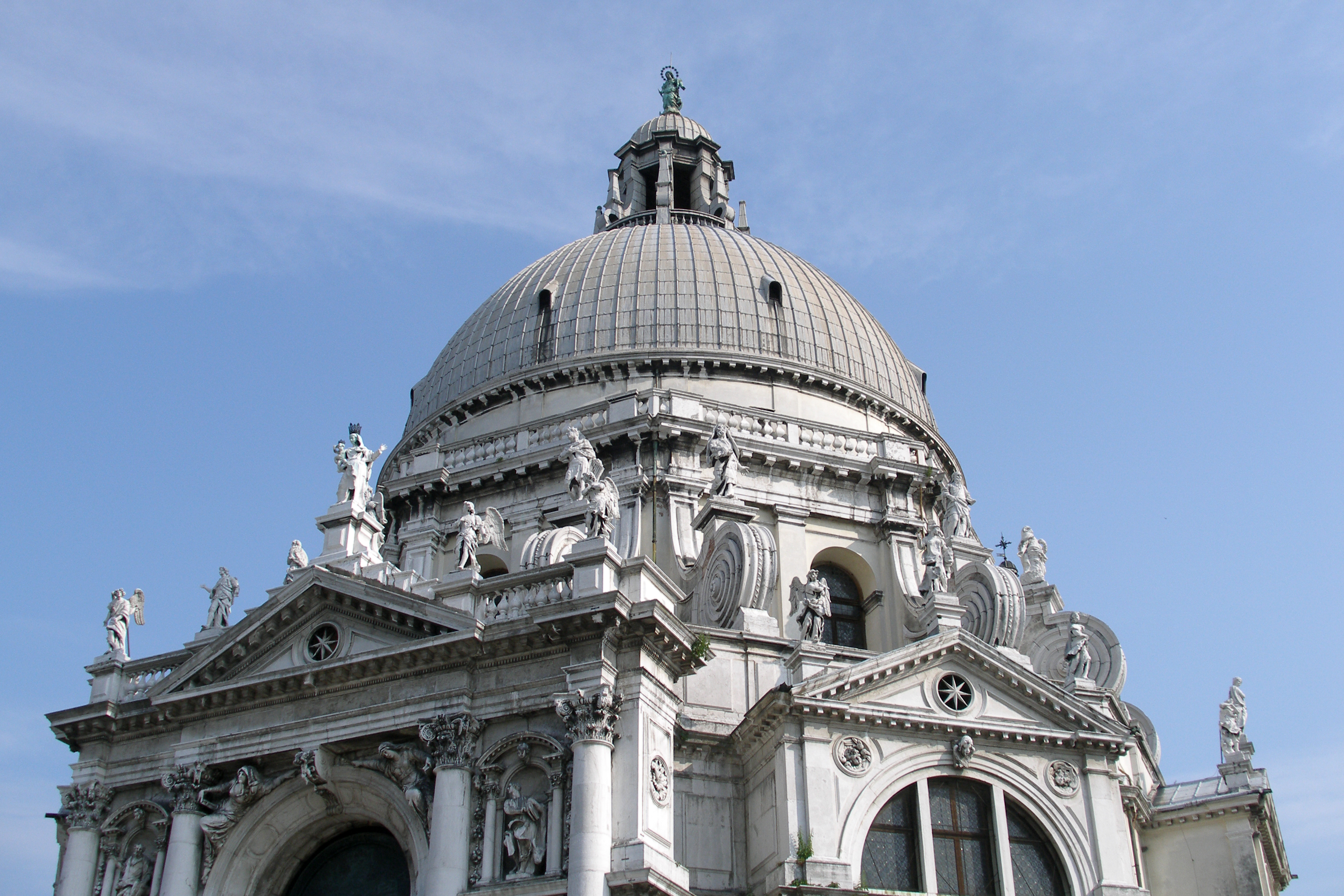
The great dome

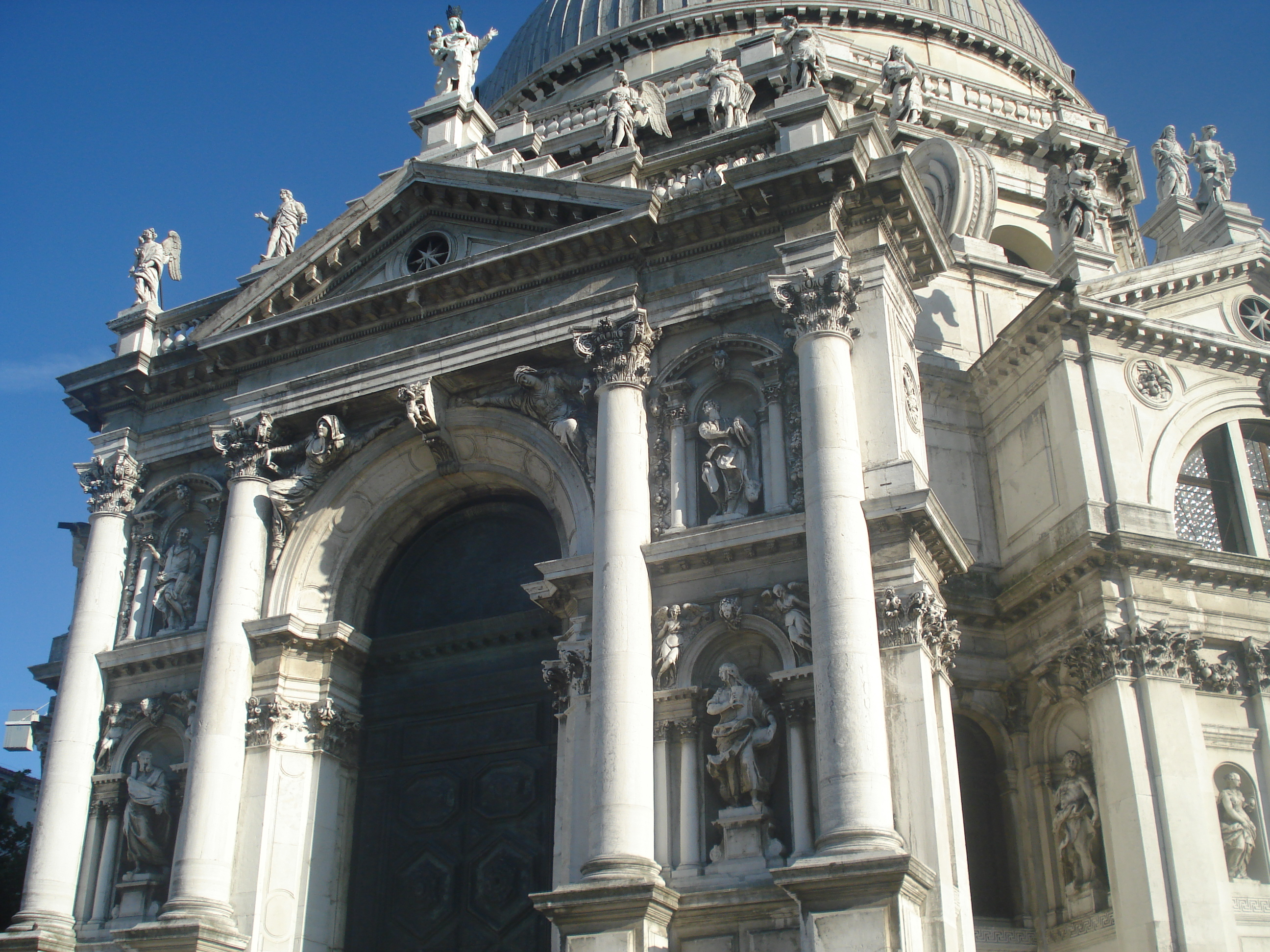
Main entrance

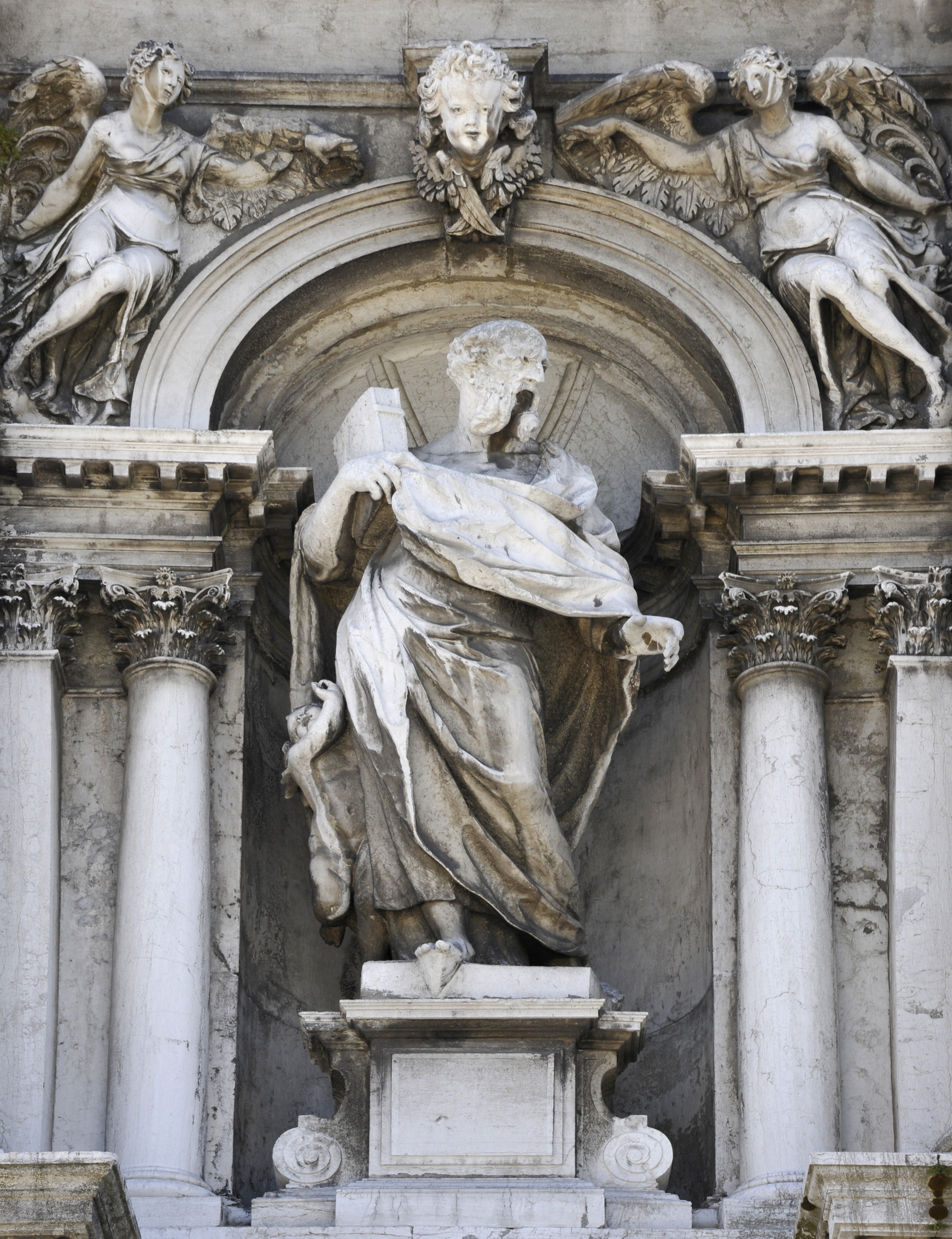
Matthew

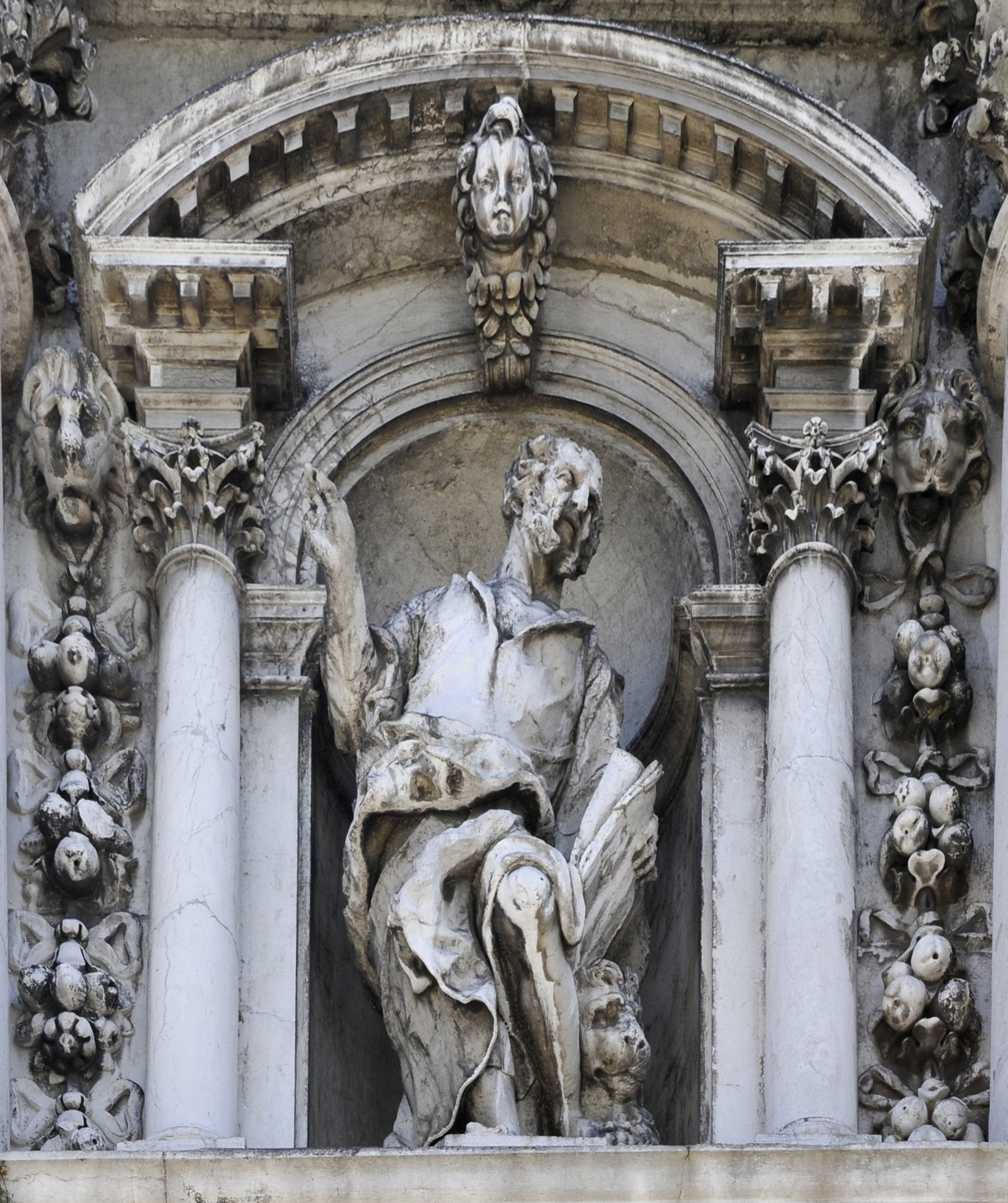
Mark

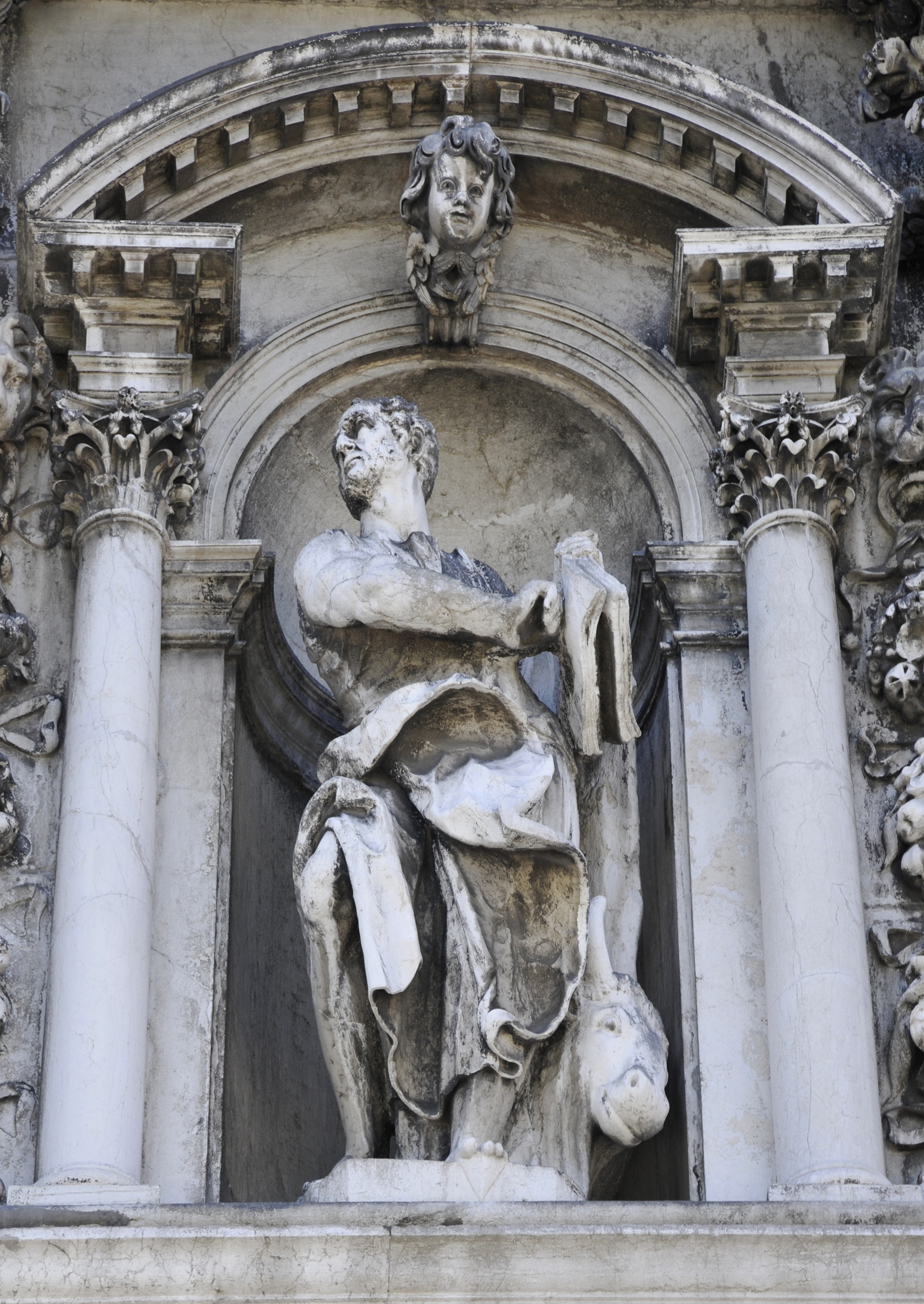
Luke

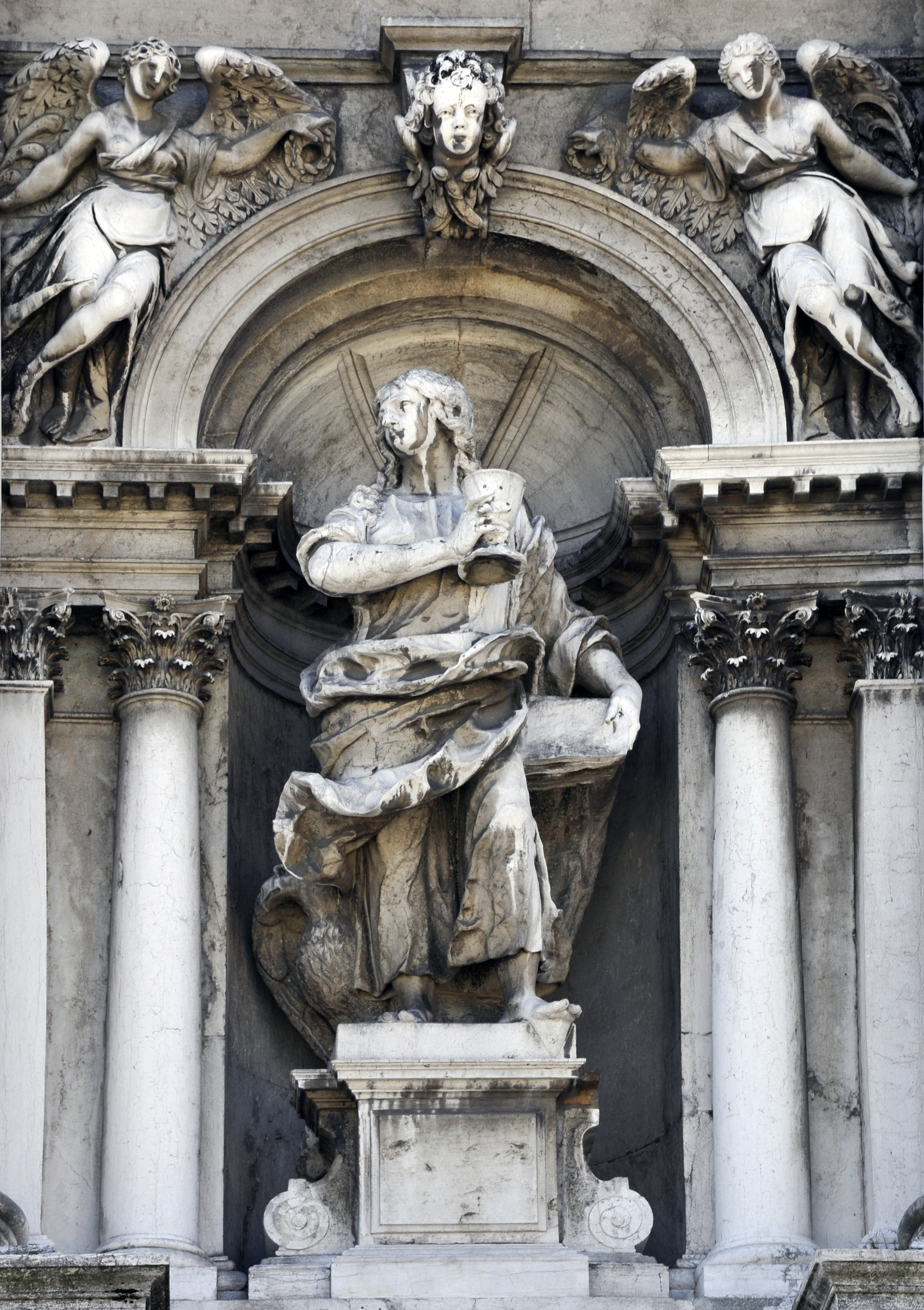
John

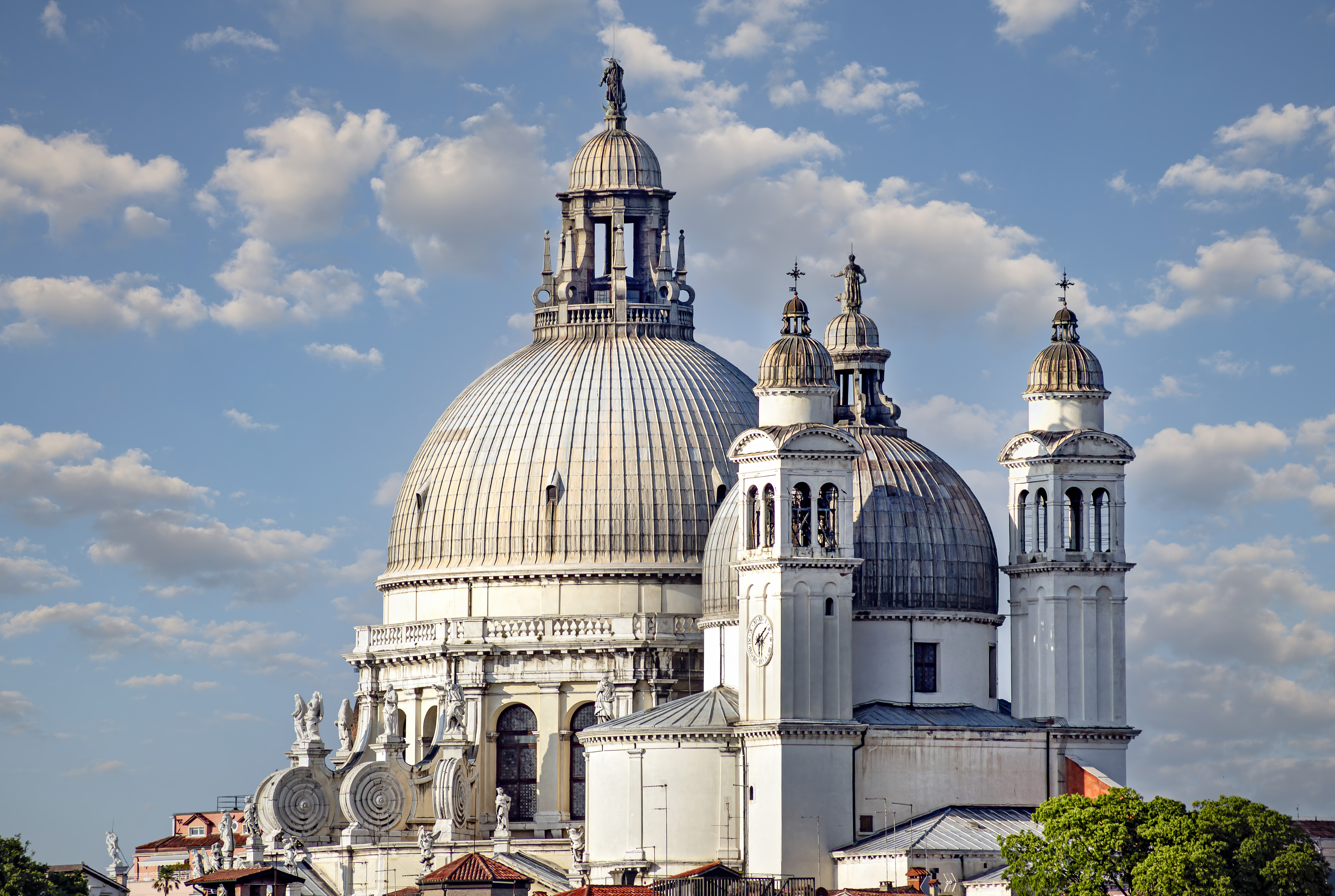
The two domes and the two bell towers

== Interior ==
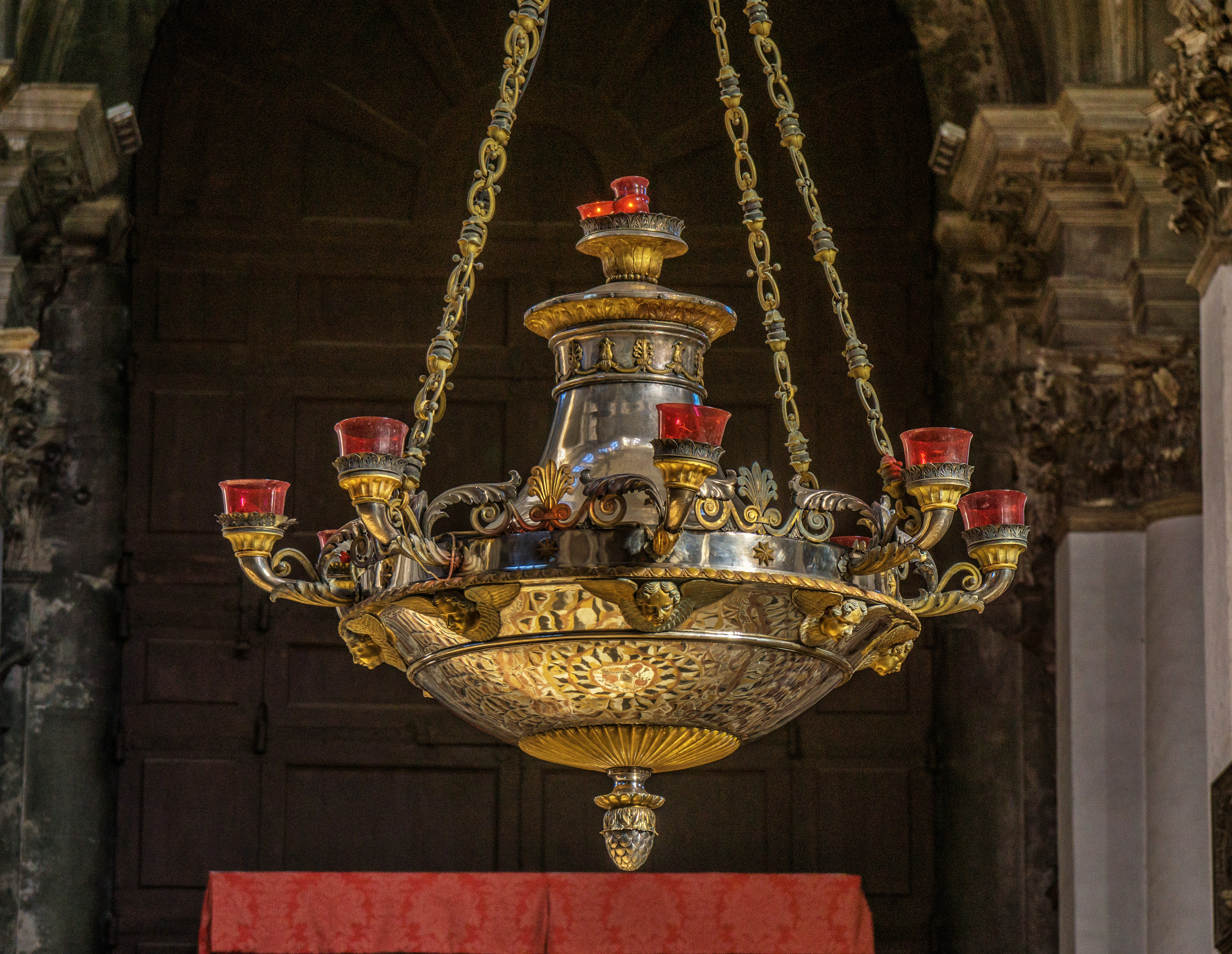
Santa Maria della Salute, hanging lantern

While its external decoration and location capture the eye, the internal design itself is quite remarkable. The octagonal church, while ringed by a classic vocabulary, hearkens to Byzantine designs such as the Basilica of San Vitale. The interior has its architectural elements demarcated by the coloration of the material, and the central nave with its ring of saints atop a balustrade is a novel design. It is full of Marian symbolism – the great dome represents her crown, the cavernous interior her womb, the eight sides the eight points on her symbolic star.

The interior is octagonal with eight radiating chapels on the outer row. The three altars to the right of the main entrance are decorated with scenes from the life of the Virgin Mary, patroness of the church, by Luca Giordano: The Presentation of Our Lady in the Temple, Assumption of Our Lady, and Nativity of Our Lady. The third altar to the left of the entrance hosts a painting by Titian titled The Descent of the Holy Spirit. The Baroque high altar arrangement, designed by Longhena himself, shelters an iconic Byzantine Madonna and Child of the 12th or 13th century, known as Panagia Mesopantitissa in Greek ("Madonna the mediator" or "Madonna the negotiator") and came from Candia in 1669 after the fall of the city to the Ottomans. The statuary group at the high altar, depicting The Queen of Heaven expelling the Plague (1670) is a theatrical Baroque masterpiece by the Flemish sculptor Josse de Corte. It originally held Alessandro Varotari's painting of the Virgin holding a church that the painter submitted with his architectural proposal.

Tintoretto painted "Marriage at Cana - 1561"., displayed in the great sacristy, which includes a self-portrait. The most represented artist included in the church is Titian, who painted St. Mark Enthroned with Saints Cosmas, Damian, Sebastian and Roch, the altarpiece of the sacristy, as well as ceiling paintings of David and Goliath, Abraham and Isaac and Cain and Abel, and eight tondi of the eight Doctors of the Church and the Evangelists, all in the great sacristy, and Pentecost in the nave.

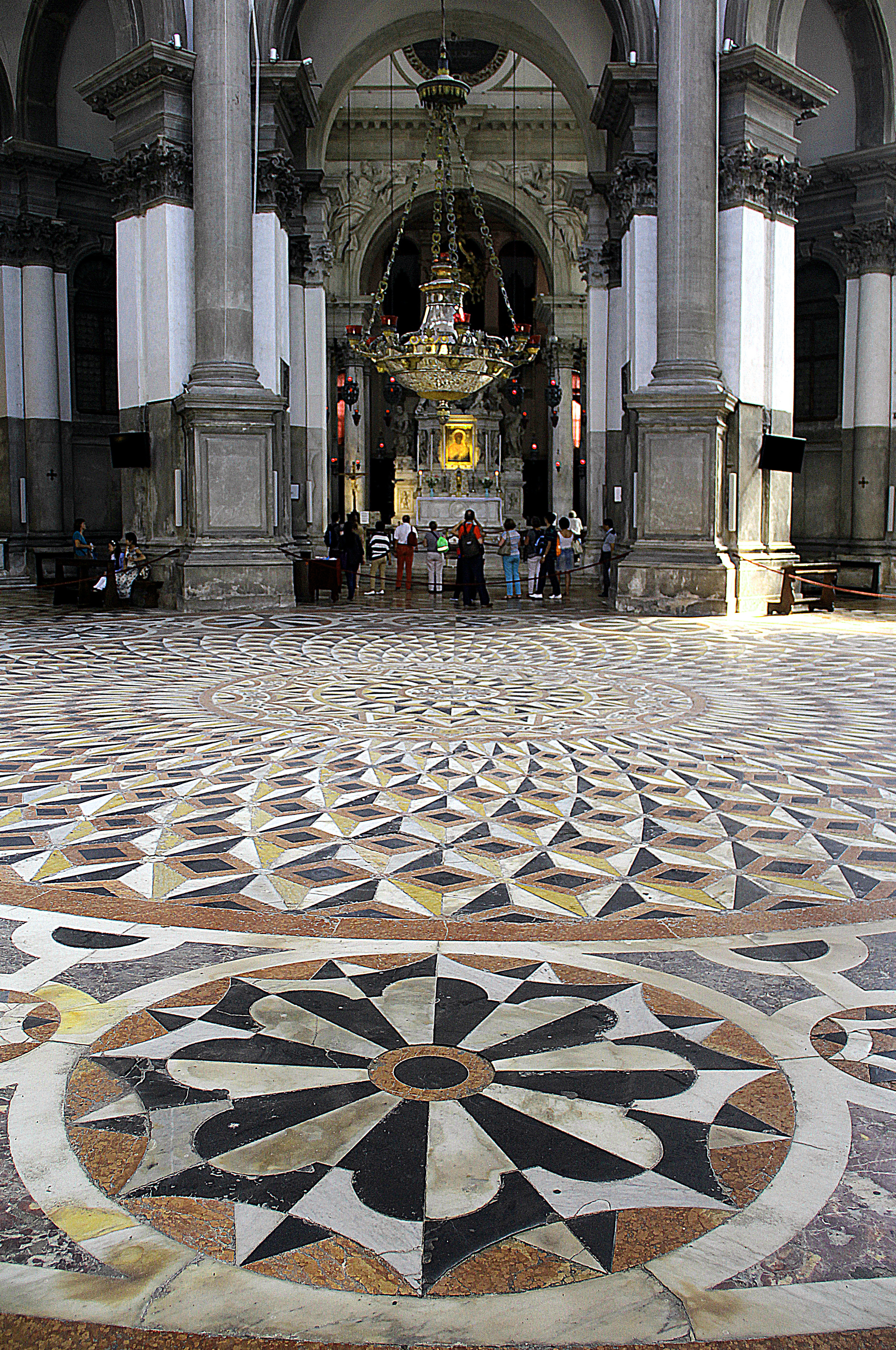
Pavement of the basilica

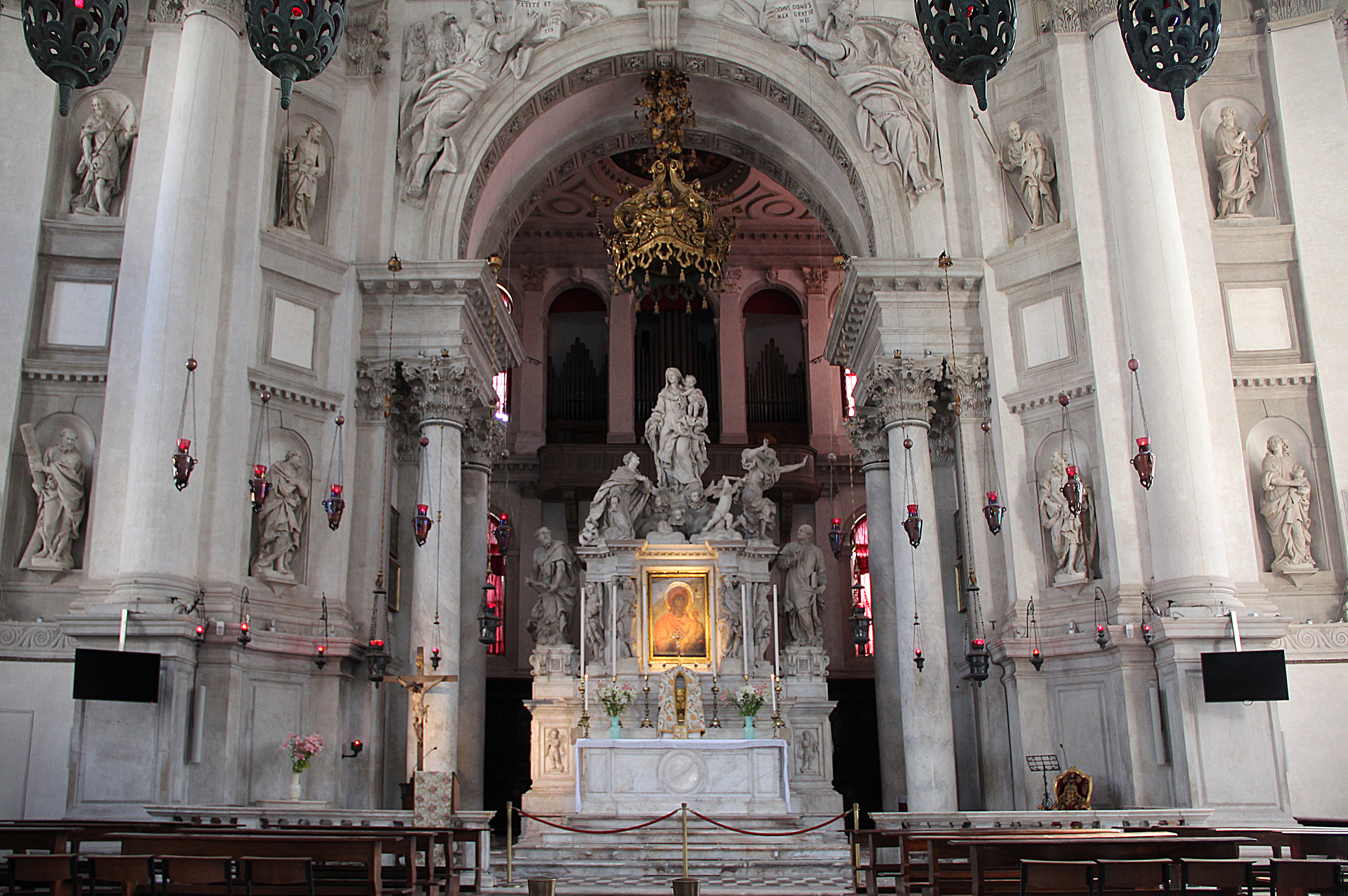
Interior facing towards the high altar

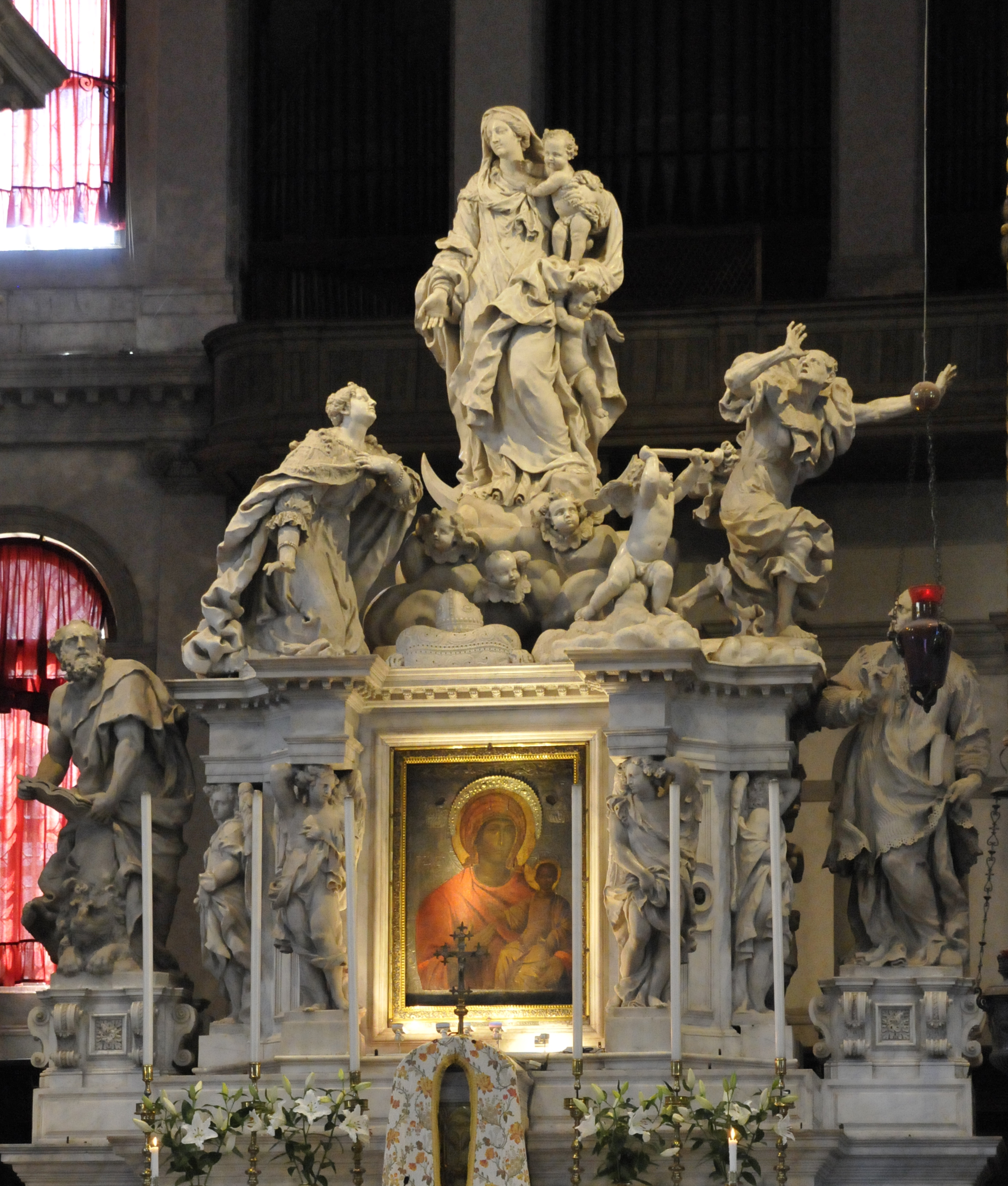
High altar with the holy icon of Panagia Mesopantitissa

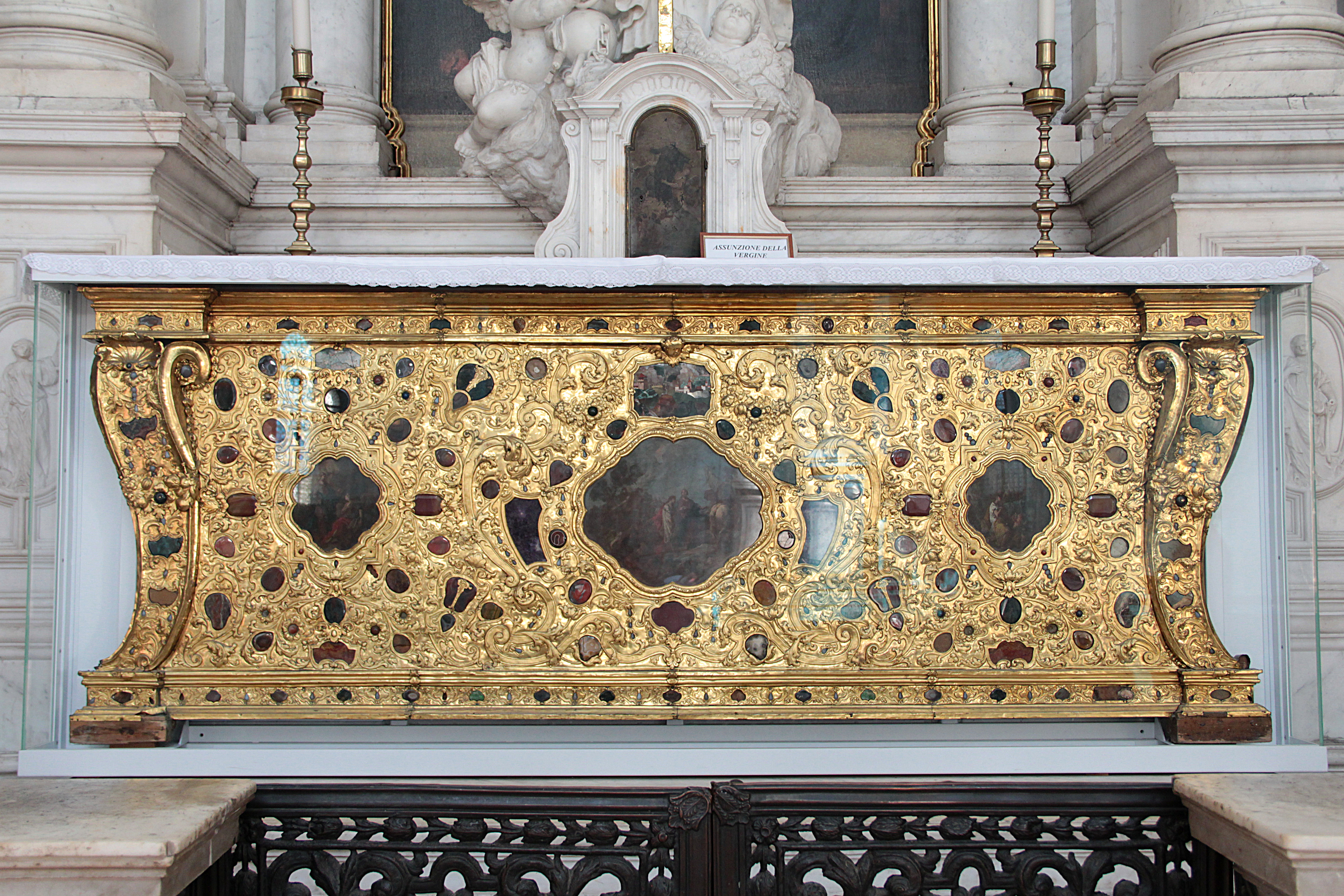
Altar of a radiant chapel

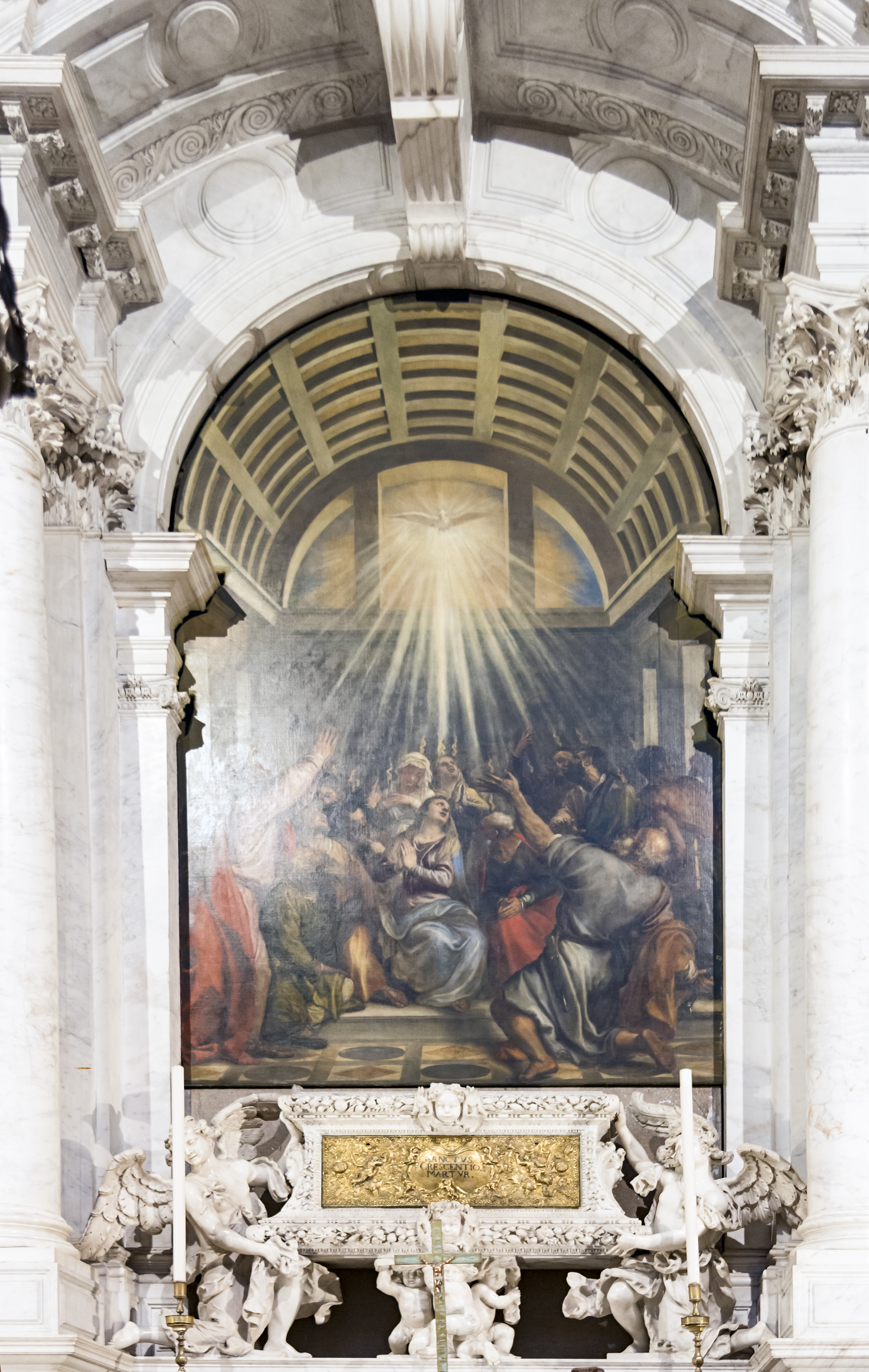
The Descent of the Holy Spirit by Titian

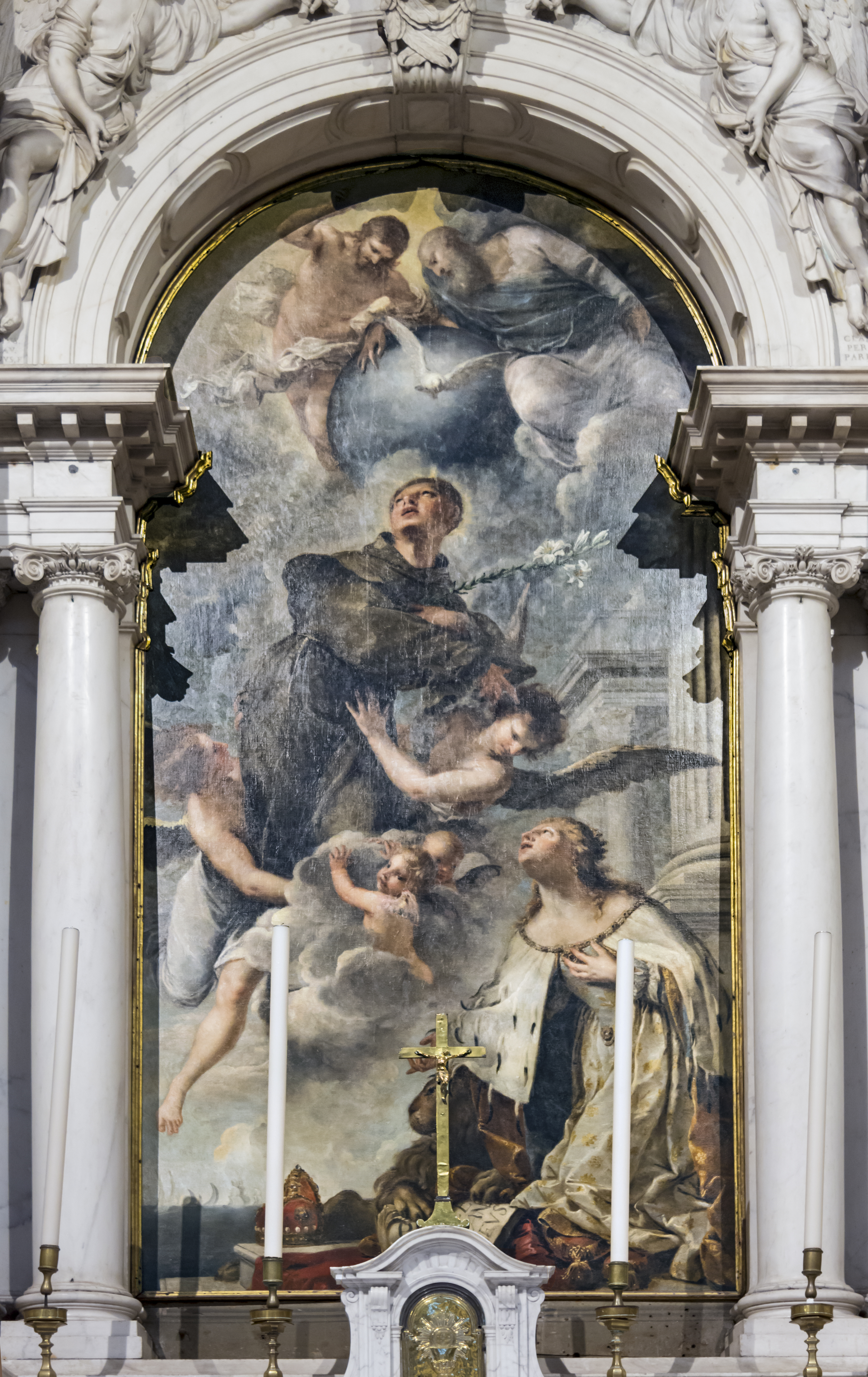
Venice at the Feet of St. Anthony of Padua by Pietro Liberi

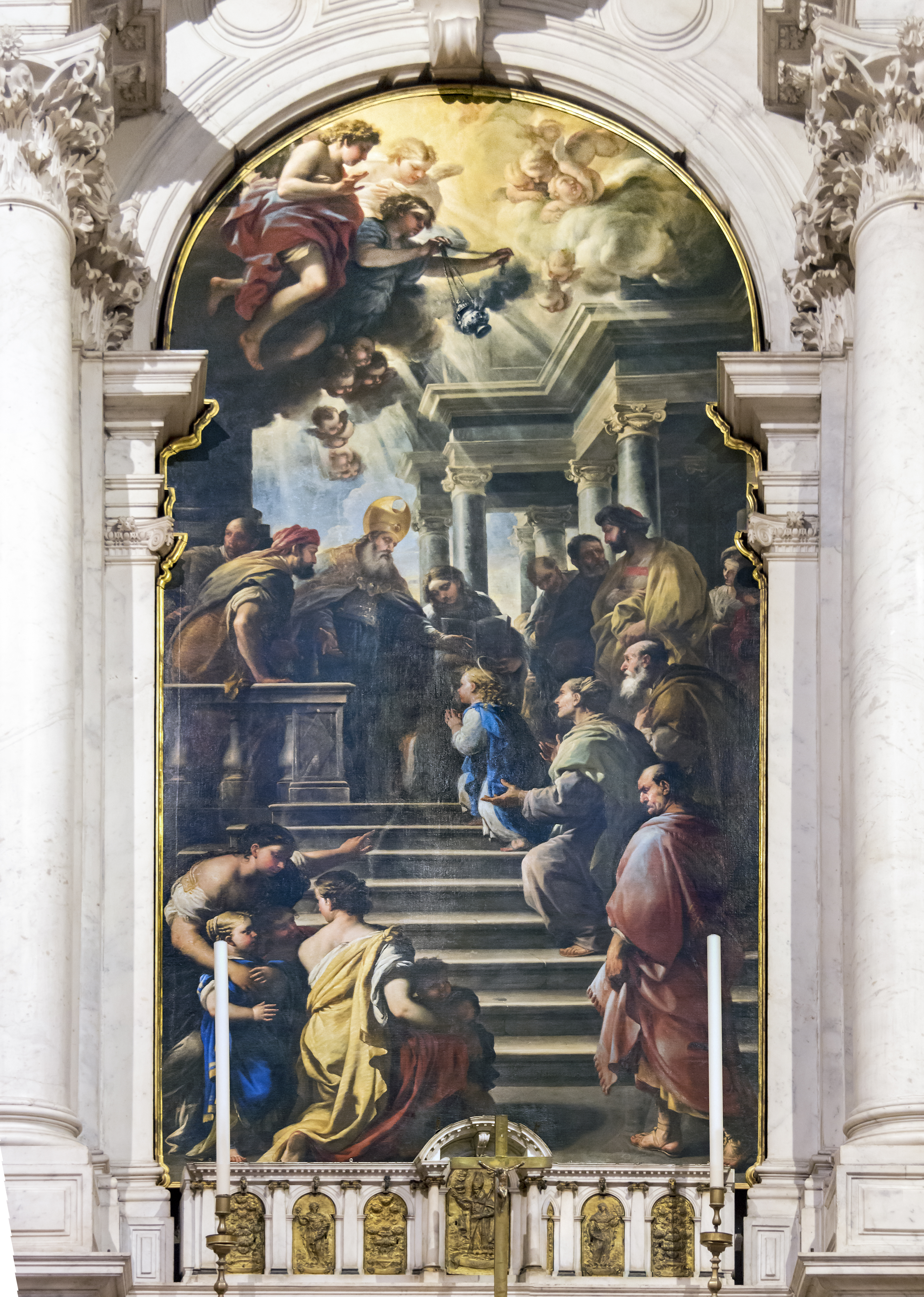
The Presentation of Our Lady in the Temple by Luca Giordano

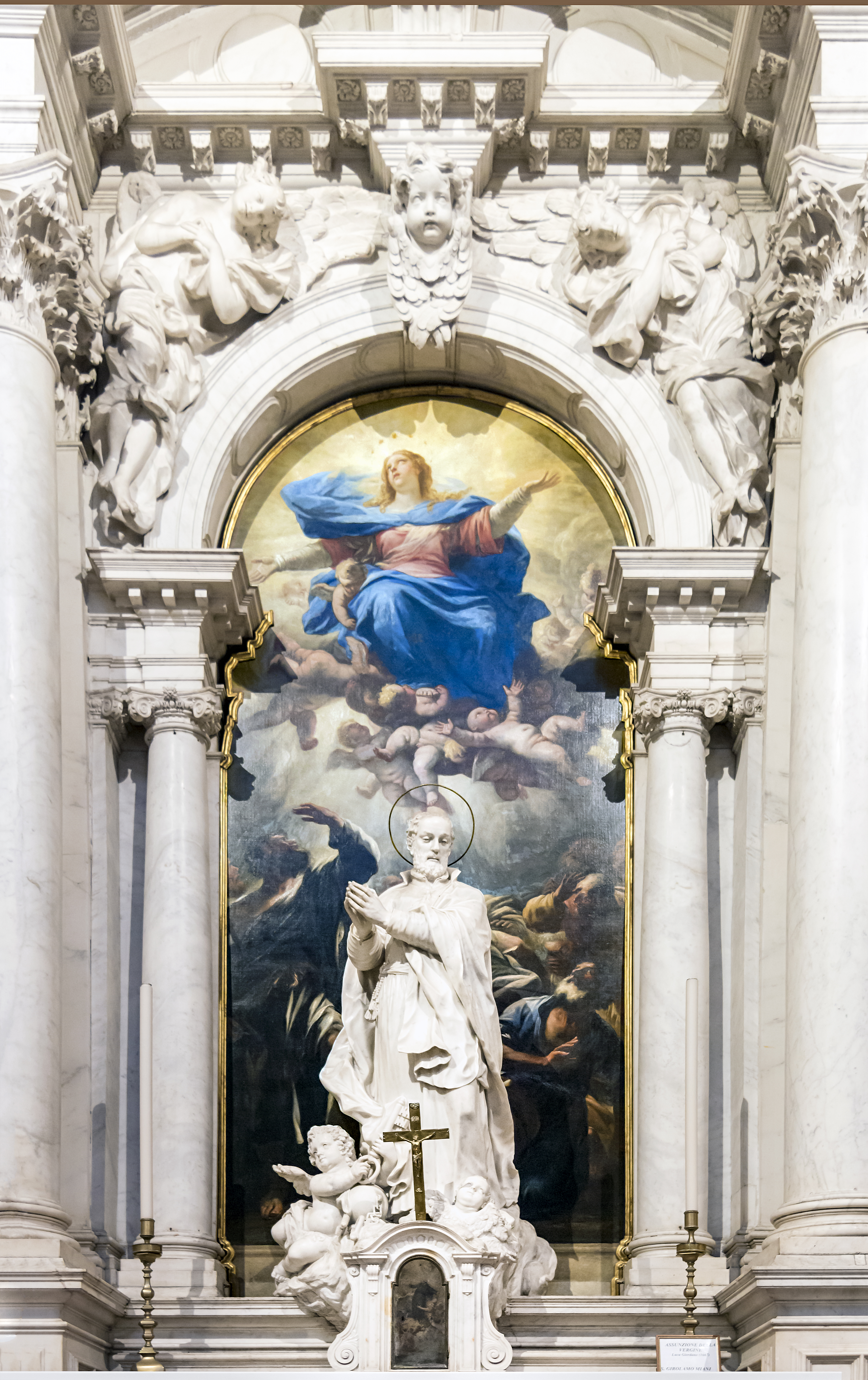
Assumption of Our Lady by Luca Giordano.

== Influence ==
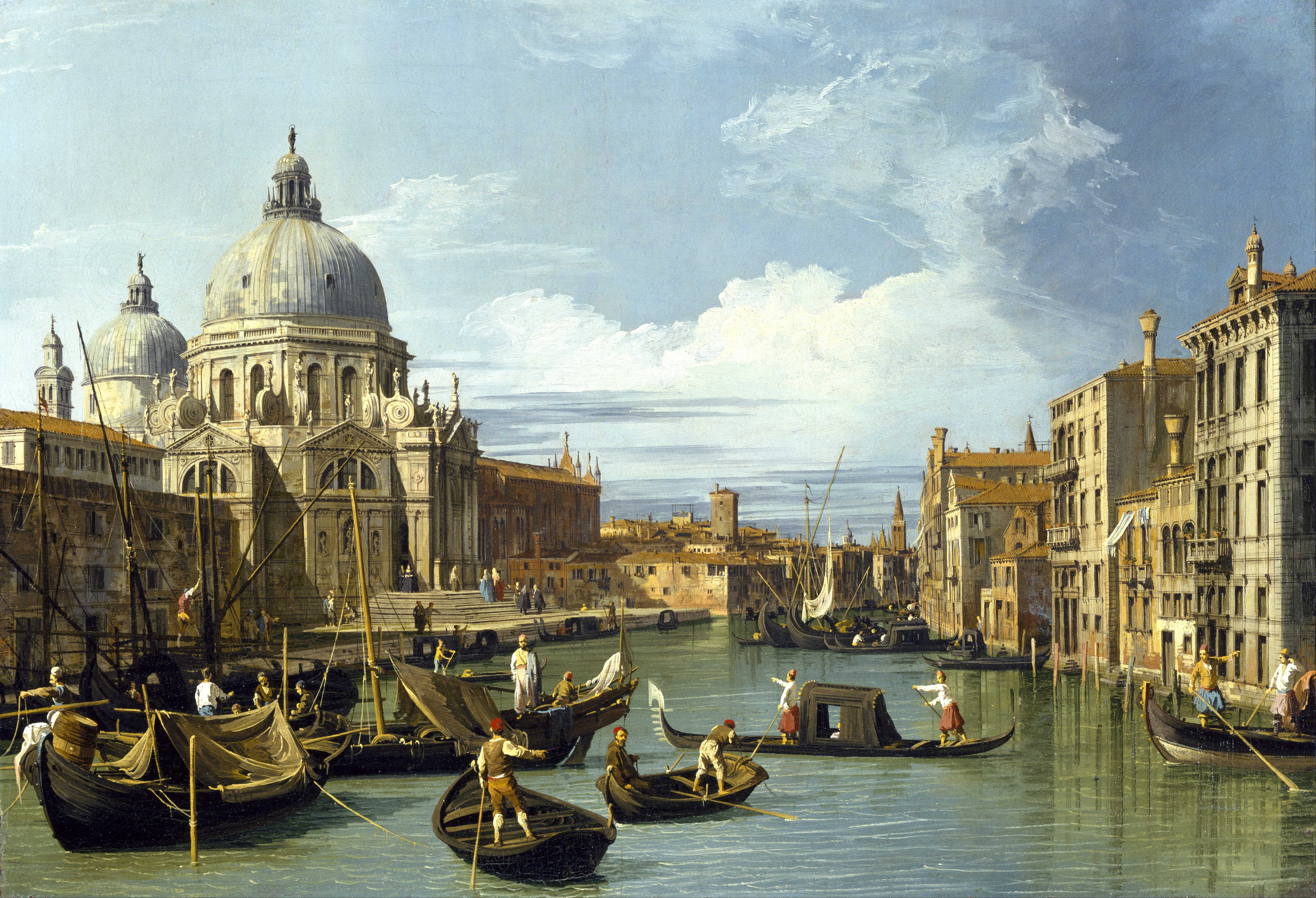
The Entrance to the Grand Canal, Venice by Canaletto (c. 1730)

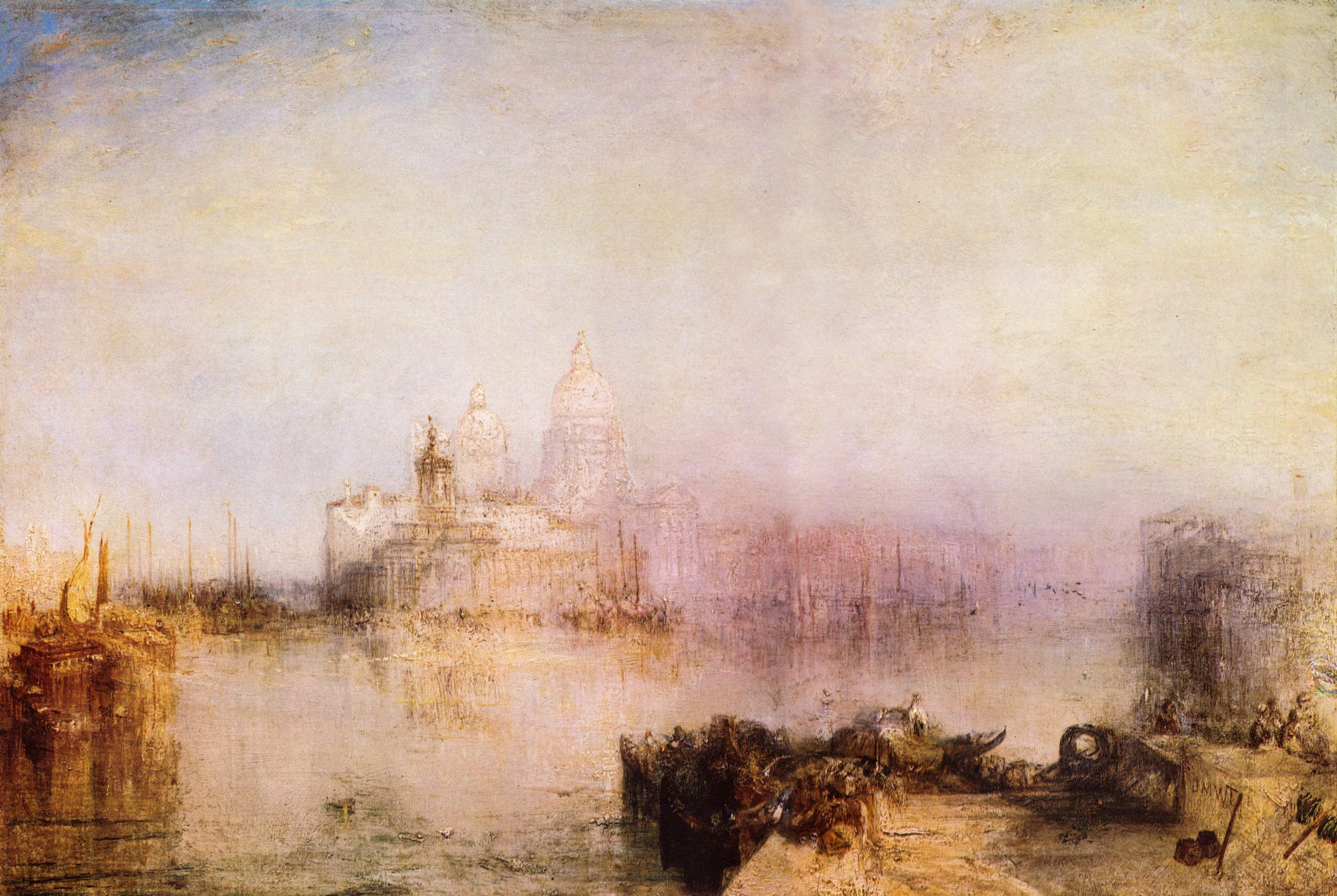
Dogana and Santa Maria della Salute by J. M. W. Turner (1843)

The dome of the Salute was an important addition to the Venetian skyline and soon became emblematic of the city, inspiring painters like Canaletto, J. M. W. Turner, Claude Monet, John Singer Sargent, Francesco Guardi, and the Serbian poet Laza Kostić to write a poem of the same title, widely considered one of the finest elegies of Romantic era in Serbian literature.

The church had a large influence on contemporary architects immediately after its completion. The structures modeled after the church include the shrine in Gostyń, built by Jerzy Catenazzi, Jan Catenazzi, and Pompeo Ferrari between 1675 and 1728, perhaps according to the original design by Baldassarre Longhena.

In 1959, the church was the subject of a design by John Piper, later adapted as a textile design by Arthur Sanderson & Sons Ltd.

The plans of the Rotunda of Xewkija in Gozo, Malta were based on Santa Maria della Salute, but on a larger scale.

== See also ==
- Basilica on the Holy Mountain, Głogówko - a basilica minor modelled on Santa Maria della Salute
- List of buildings and structures in Venice
- List of churches in Venice
- Roman Catholic Marian churches
- 17th-century Western domes
- Symbolism of domes

== Notes ==
Preceded by San Giorgio Maggiore	Venice landmarks Santa Maria della Salute	Succeeded by Santa Maria Gloriosa dei Frari
