= Santo Spirito (island) =

Island in the Venetian Lagoon

Coordinates: 45°24′01″N 12°20′02″E

Santo Spirito is an island in the southern Venetian Lagoon situated between the islands of Poveglia and San Clemente. The island has a land area of 6.2 acres (2.5 ha).

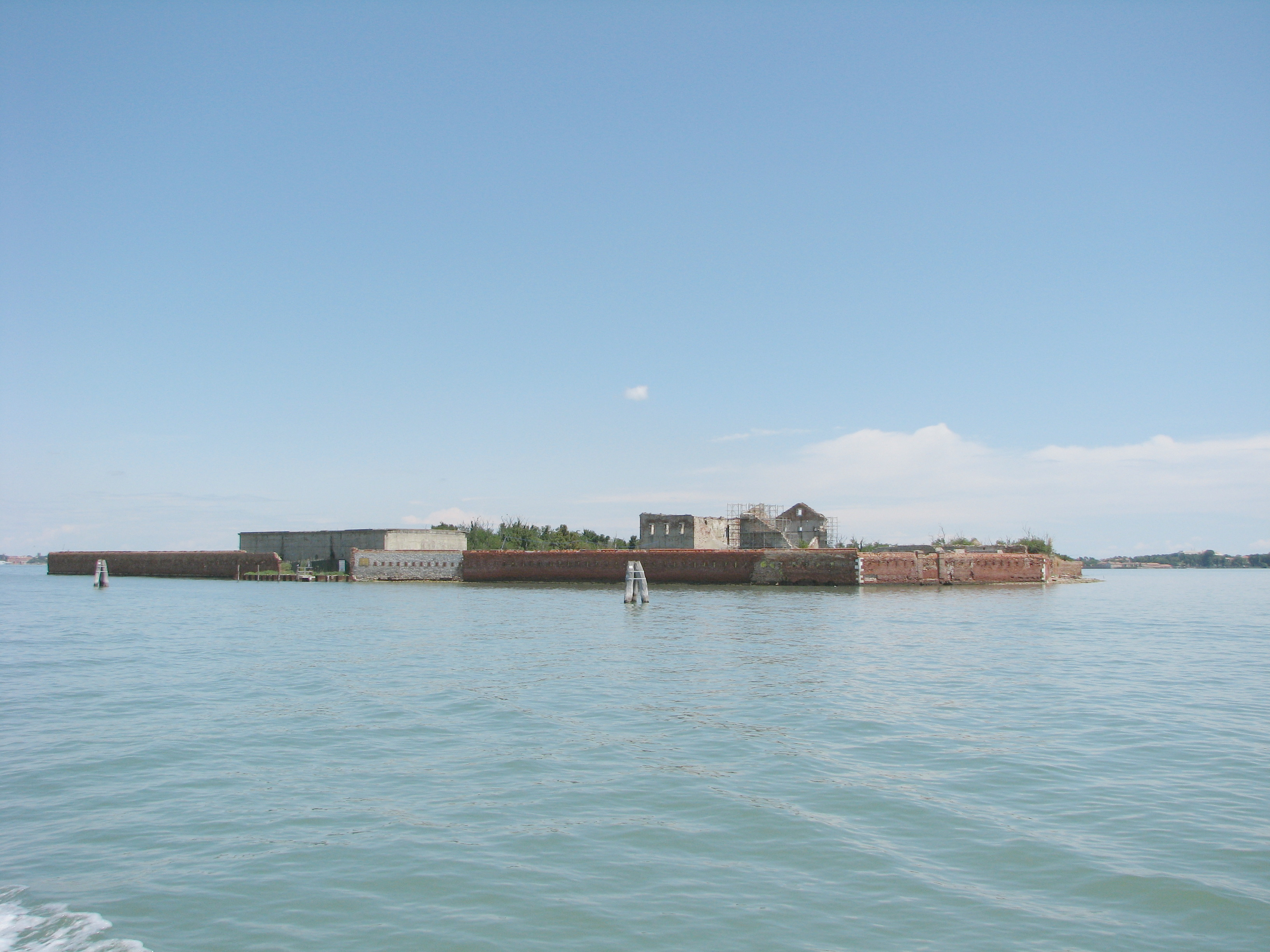

== History ==
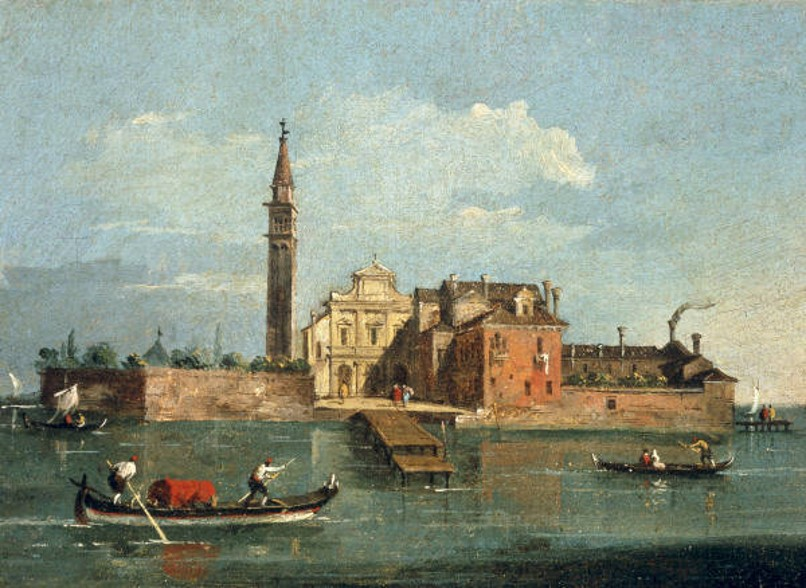
Painting by Francesco Guardi of the island some time in the 18th century

For much of its history, the island housed a monastery first constructed in the 12th century.

In 2011, the island was put up for sale while under the ownership of local real estate company Poveglia Ltd. The island had been approved for residential, office, or hotel use and had an asking price of €20 million (then $28 million).

In 2018, the island was purchased by Australian investment group Mayfair 101 under the leadership of James Mawhinney, who envisioned a luxury resort on the island. The company disclosed that it paid less than half the €20 million asking price. The purchase was problematic, however, with the Supreme Court of Victoria finding that the means by which Mawhinney purchased the island through a chain of transactions were of "questionable validity". Furthermore, it was revealed that Mayfair had not obtained building permits. The island was liquidated in 2020 with no development by Mayfair.
