= Saint Mark Enthroned =

Painting by Titian

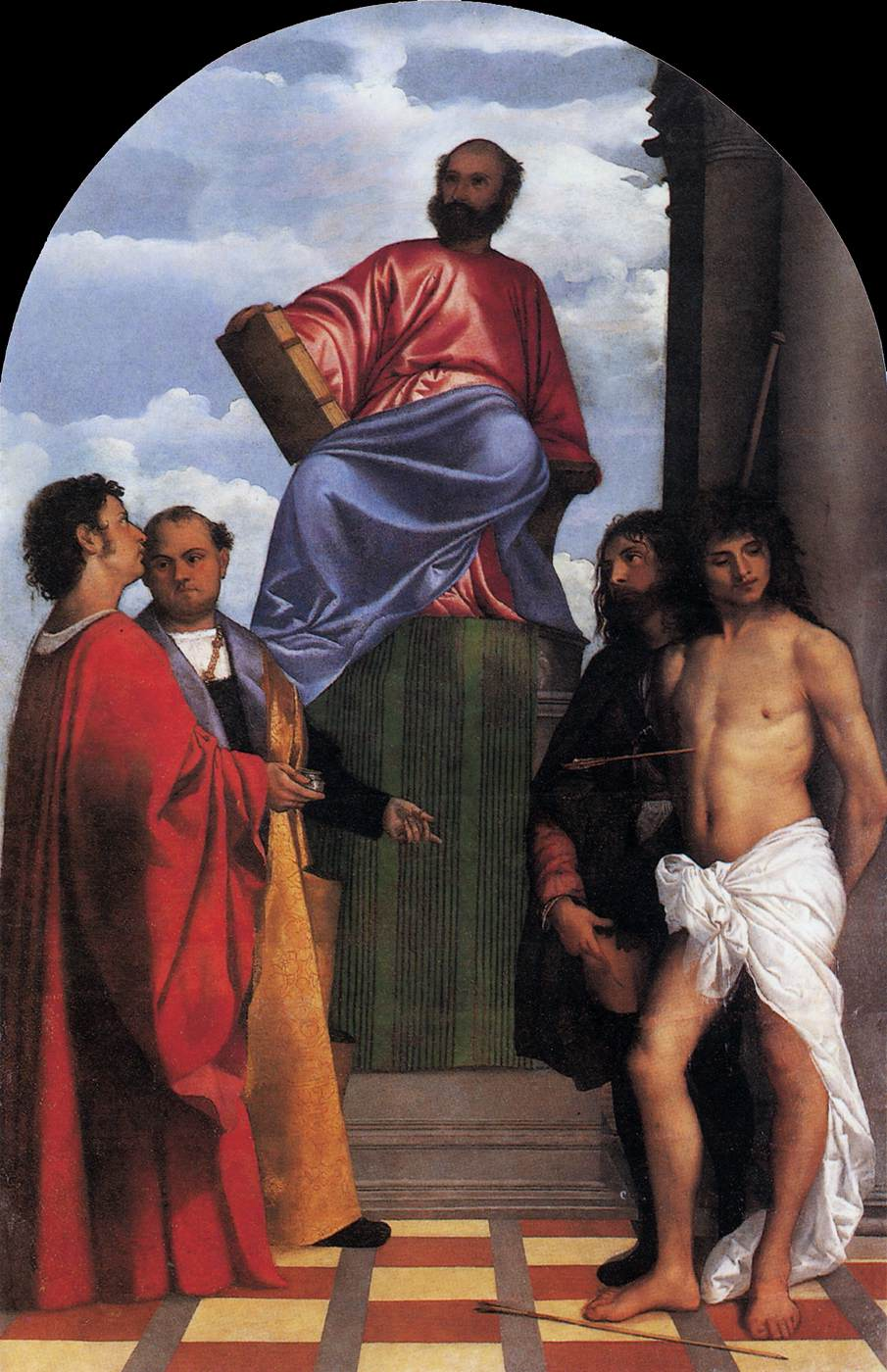
- Artist: Titian
- Year: 1510-1511
- Medium: Oil on panel
- Dimensions: 218 cm × 149 cm (86 in × 59 in)
- Location: Santa Maria della Salute, Venice

Saint Mark Enthroned is an oil on panel painting by the Italian Renaissance artist Titian, created in 1510–1511. It is still in the church of Santa Maria della Salute, in Venice.

== Description ==
Saint Mark, the patron saint of the Republic of Venice, is depicted on a high throne, surrounded by Saints Cosmas and Damian to the left and Saints Roch and Sebastian to the right. Like Titian's other paintings from these years, it shows the influence of Giorgione, who died young in 1510.

== See also ==
- List of works by Titian
