= A Famosa =

Portuguese fortress in Malacca, Malaysia

- Kota A Famosa (in Malay)
- Malacca, Malaysia
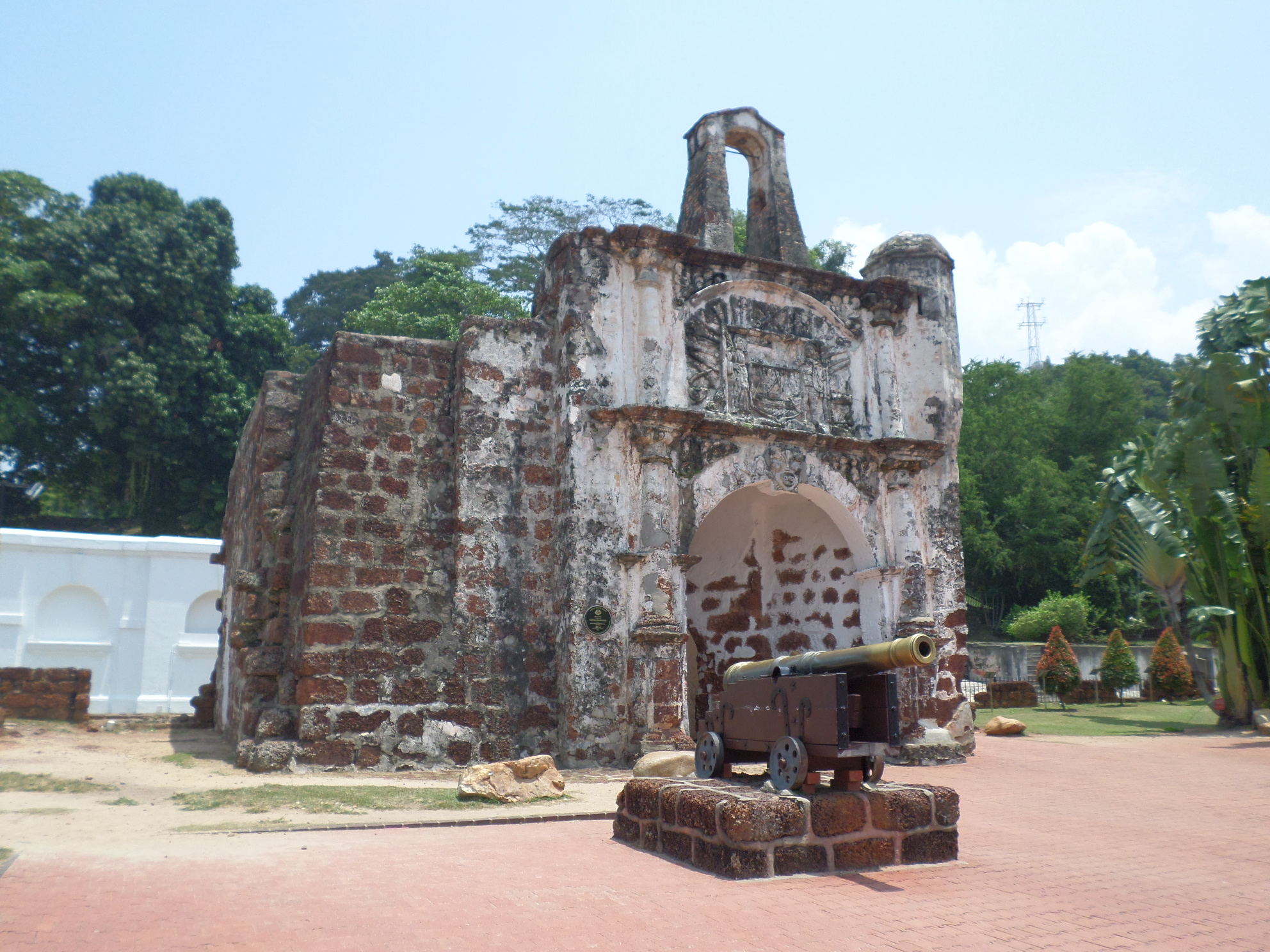
- The surviving gate of the Portuguese fort in Malacca.

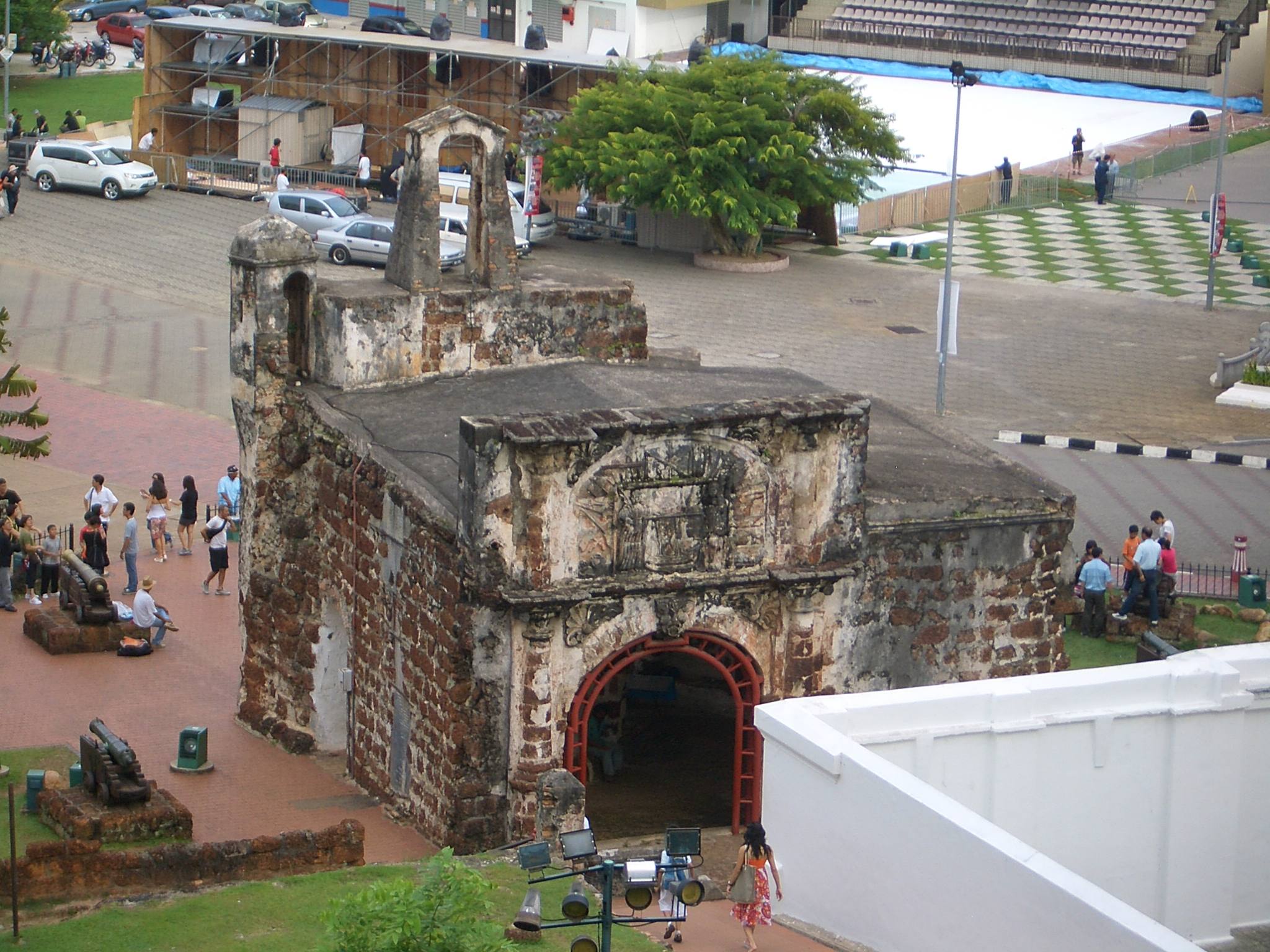
- A view of the gate of the fort from the rear.

Site information
- Controlled by: Portugal (1512–1641); Netherlands (1641–1795); Britain (1795–1807)
- Open to the public: Yes
- Condition: Largely destroyed except for a few remaining structures

Location
- Coordinates: 2°11′29.82″N 102°15′1.10″E

Site history
- Built: c. 1512
- Built by: Portuguese Empire
- In use: 1512–1807
- Demolished: 10 August 1807 (except for a small gate house)

Garrison information
- Past commanders: Afonso de Albuquerque

A Famosa (Portuguese pronunciation: [ɐ faˈmɔzɐ]) was a Portuguese fortress built in Malacca, Malaysia, around 1512. The oldest part of the fortress was a five-storey keep which eventually gave its name to the fortress as a whole. Some time following the Battle of Malacca (1641) and the occupation of the city by the Dutch, the keep was destroyed but the outer walls of the fortress were expanded. However, in 1811 the British destroyed all of the original fortress and most of the outer walls. The Porta de Santiago gateway, and the rebuilt Middelburg Bastion, are the only parts of the fortress that remain today.

== Name ==
"A Famosa" means "The Famous" in Portuguese; its alternate Portuguese name is Fortaleza Velha (Old Fortress). During the Dutch era it was known in Dutch as Slavenburgh (slave castle) & De Misericorde (Our Lady of Mercy).

The name is often mispronounced as "/ˈeɪ/ Famosa", even among Malaysians, as though the Portuguese feminine definite article "a" were the letter "A" in the English alphabet. A more accurate pronunciation would be "/ɐ/ Famosa" (approximating "uh").

Although "A Famosa" was technically the name at first given to the main watchtower, and then to the entire fortress of Malacca, in the present day it most often refers to the only remaining gate of the fortress, the Porta de Santiago. The name "A Famosa" is thus a unique case of a pars pro toto which then became a totum pro parte over the course of time.

== History ==
In 1511, a Portuguese fleet arrived under the command of Afonso de Albuquerque. His forces attacked and defeated the armies of the Malacca Sultanate. Moving quickly to consolidate his gains, Albuquerque had the fortress built around a natural hill near the sea. Albuquerque believed that Malacca would become an important port linking Portugal to the Spice Route in China. At this time other Portuguese were establishing outposts in such places as Macau, China and Goa, India to create a string of friendly ports for ships heading to Ming China and returning home to Portugal.

Hundreds of slaves were used to build this fort. Its materials included using the rubble of destroyed Malaccan mosques and tombs. The fortress once consisted of long ramparts and four major towers. One of the towers was a 60-m tall four-storey keep, known as A Famosa ('The Famous'), which was the tallest building in the region from 1512 until it was destroyed by the Dutch in 1641. Other parts of the fortress included an ammunition storage room, the residence of the captain, and an officers' quarters. There were also town houses inside the fortress walls. As Malacca's population expanded it outgrew the original fort and extensions were added around 1586.

The fort changed hands in 1641 when the Dutch drove the Portuguese out of Malacca. The Dutch renovated the gate in 1670, which explains the logo "ANNO 1670" inscribed on the gate's arch. Above the arch is a bas-relief logo of the Dutch East India Company.

The fortress changed hands again in the late 18th century when the Dutch handed it over to the British to prevent it from falling into the hands of Napoleon's expansionist France. The English were wary of maintaining the fortification and ordered its destruction in 1806. The fort was almost totally demolished but for the timely intervention of Sir Stamford Raffles, the founder of modern Singapore, who was sent on sick leave from Penang to Malacca in 1807. It was Captain William Farquhar, tasked with the destruction of the fort and town, who decided to save two of the gateways to the fort, including the Santiago Gate, as well as the Stadthuys, church and jail.

== Partial restoration ==
In late November 2006, a part of the fort, believed to be the Middelburg Bastion, was accidentally uncovered during the construction of 110 meter revolving tower in Malacca Town. The construction of the tower was ceased and its site was subsequently shifted to the popular district of Bandar Hilir on Jalan Merdeka where it was officially opened to the public on 18 April 2008. Malacca Museums Corporation suspects the structure was built by the Dutch during the Dutch occupation of Malacca from 1641 to 1824. Earlier in June 2004, a watchtower named Santiago Bastion was discovered during the construction of Dataran Pahlawan. In 2006-2007 the Middelburg Bastion was restored.

== Gallery ==
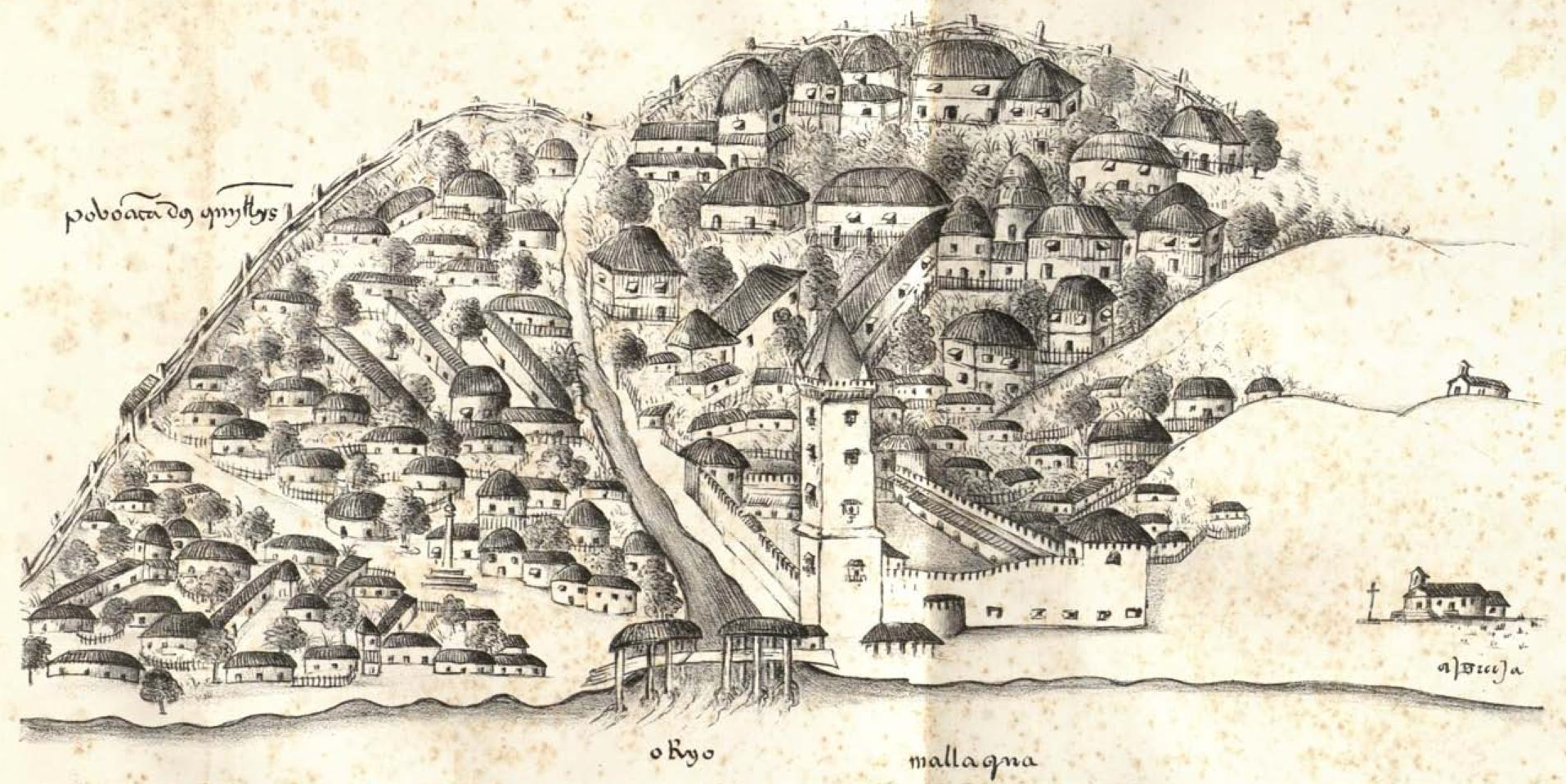
Malacca including the tower of the A Famosa fortress (1550–1563)

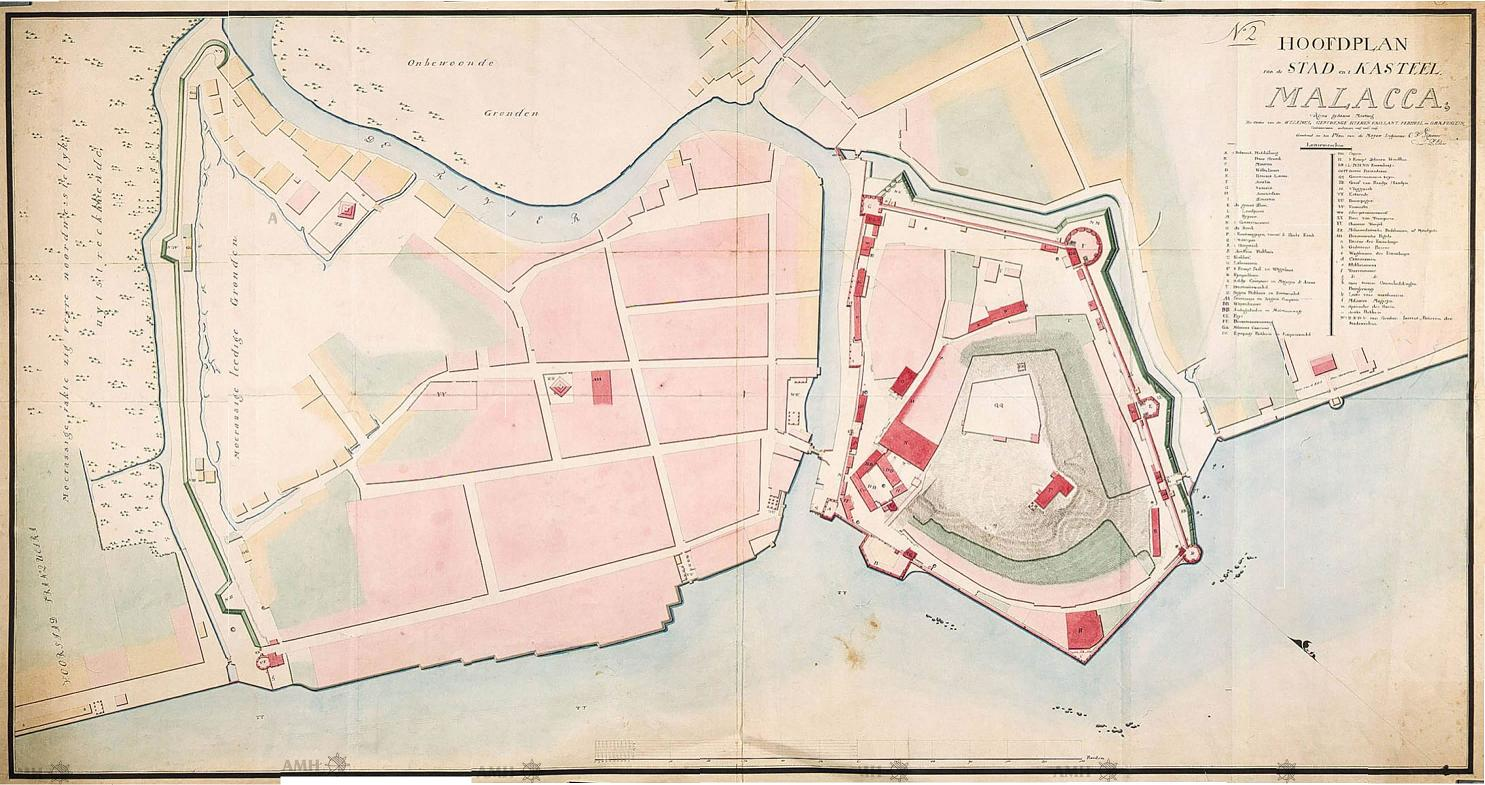
The town and fortress of Malacca (1780)

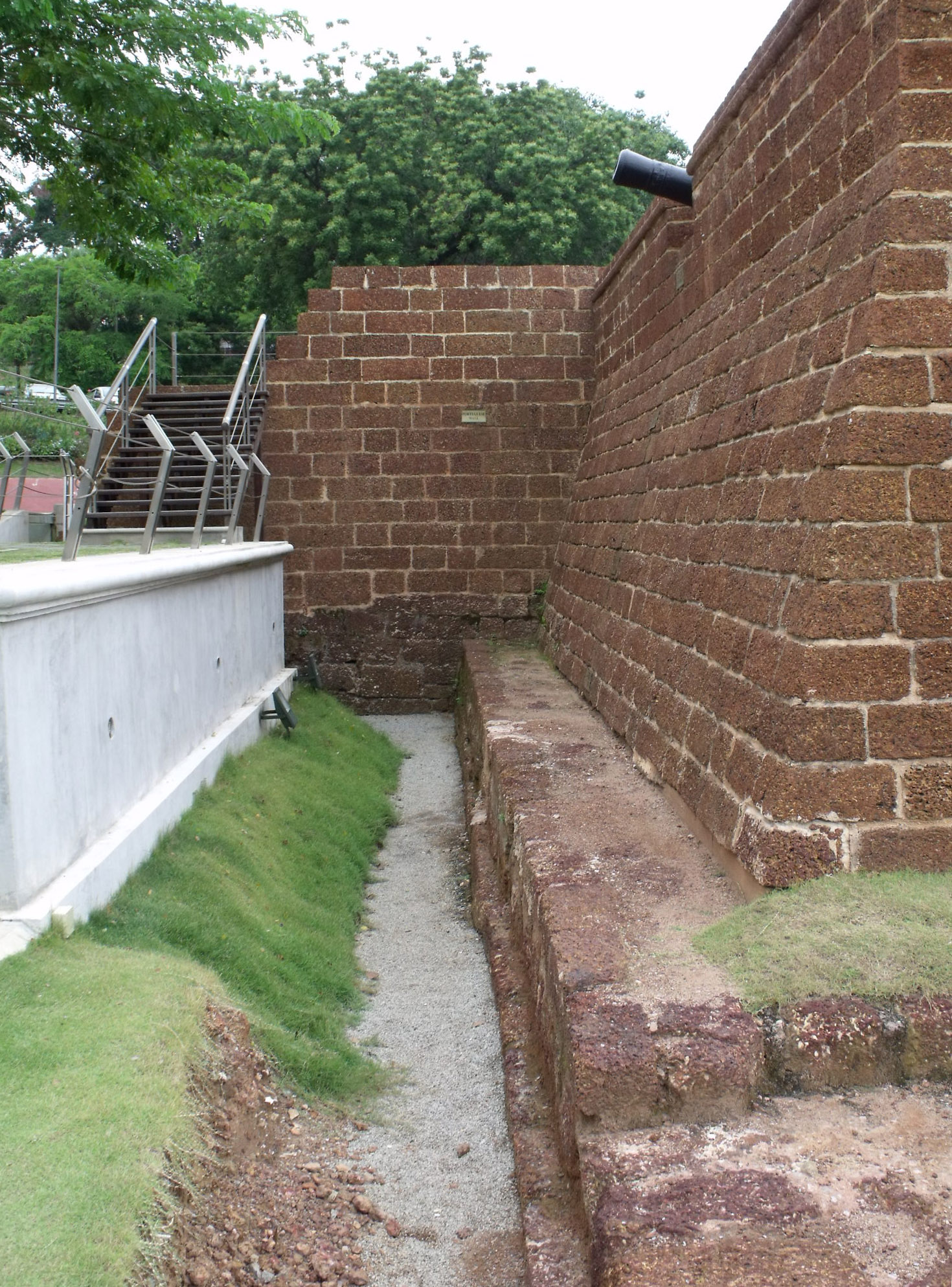
Reconstruction of watchtower on top of the unearthed remains

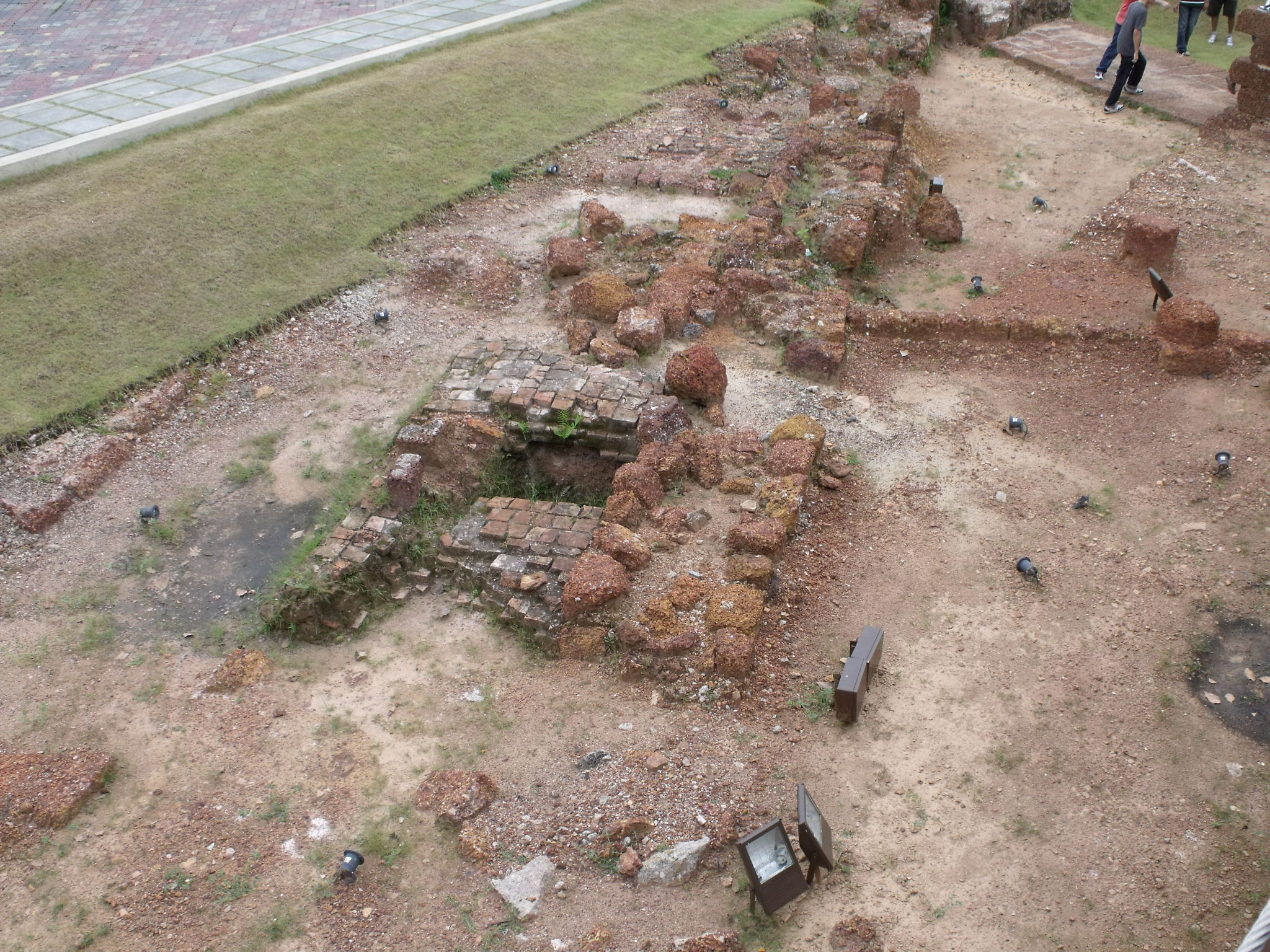
Malacca sanitary sewer line ruin

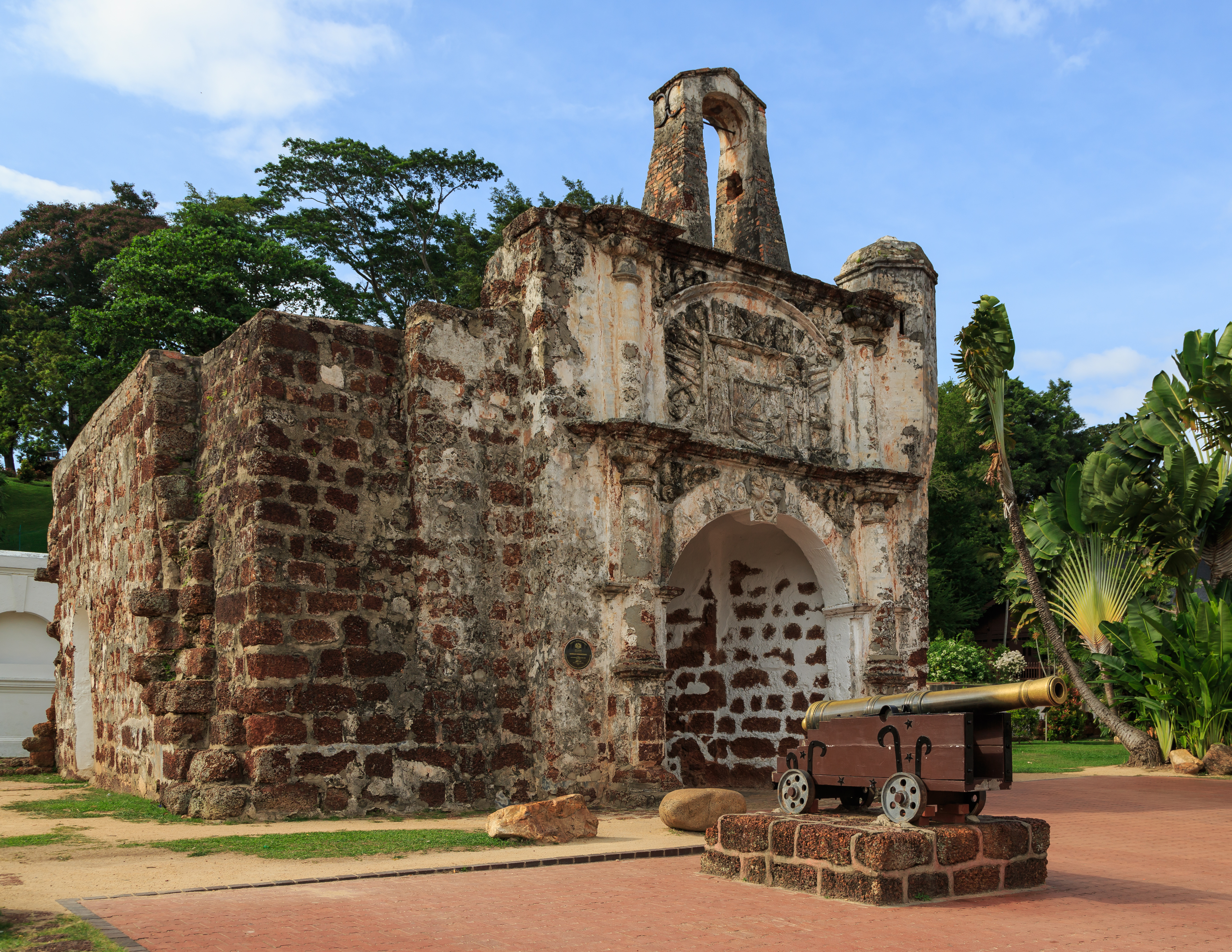
Malacca Fortress

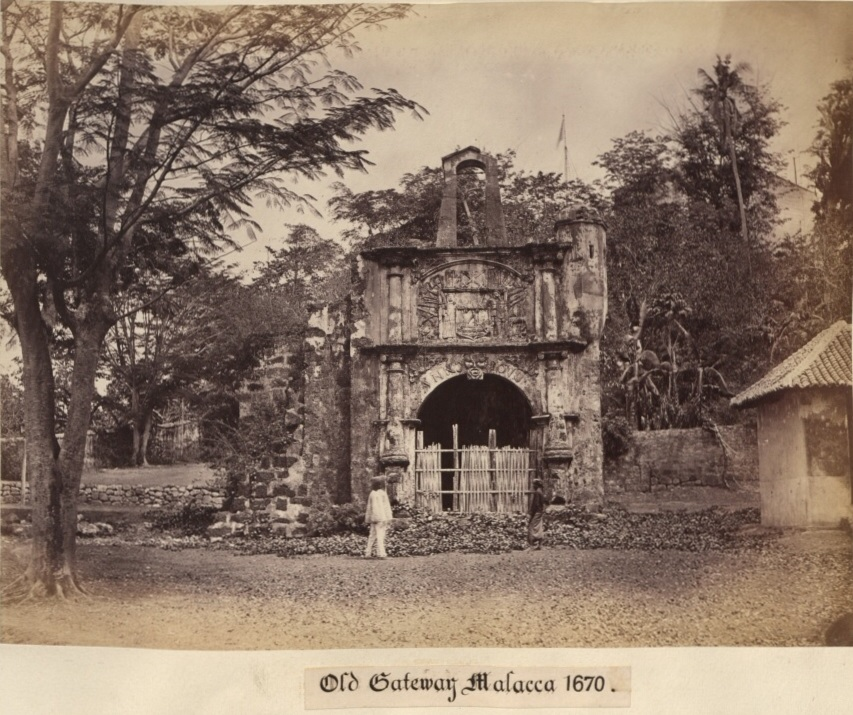
View of the fortress during 1860s to 1900
