= Difrasismo =

Difrasismo is a term derived from Spanish that is used in the study of certain Mesoamerican languages, to describe a particular grammatical construction in which two separate words are paired together to form a single metaphoric unit. This semantic and stylistic device was commonly employed throughout Mesoamerica, and features notably in historical works of Mesoamerican literature, in languages such as Classical Nahuatl and Classic Maya.

The term was first introduced by Ángel María Garibay K.

Atl-tlachinolli ['water, burnt-earth'] Aztec symbol of war, based on the Teocalli of the Sacred War sculpture back.

For example, in Nahuatl the expression cuitlapilli ahtlapalli or in cuitlapilli in ahtlapalli, literally 'the tail, the wing', is used in a metaphoric sense to mean 'the people' or 'the common folk'. The Aztecs' term in xochitl in cuicatl ['flower and song'] could refer to any artistic endeavor in general and the effect of the divine force teotl. The pair in tonan, in tota ['our mother, our father'] (which in classical Nahuatl is the only gender-neutral way to refer to a "parent") is often part of an invocation to a high god. The atl-tlachinolli ['water, burnt-earth'] or atlachinolli pairs the elemental opposites of water and fire (each a force for both life and destruction) into a single symbol of war.

== See also ==
- Dvandva
- Hendiadys
- Kenning
- Merism
- Parallelism (grammar)
