= Merism =

Synecdochic figure of speech

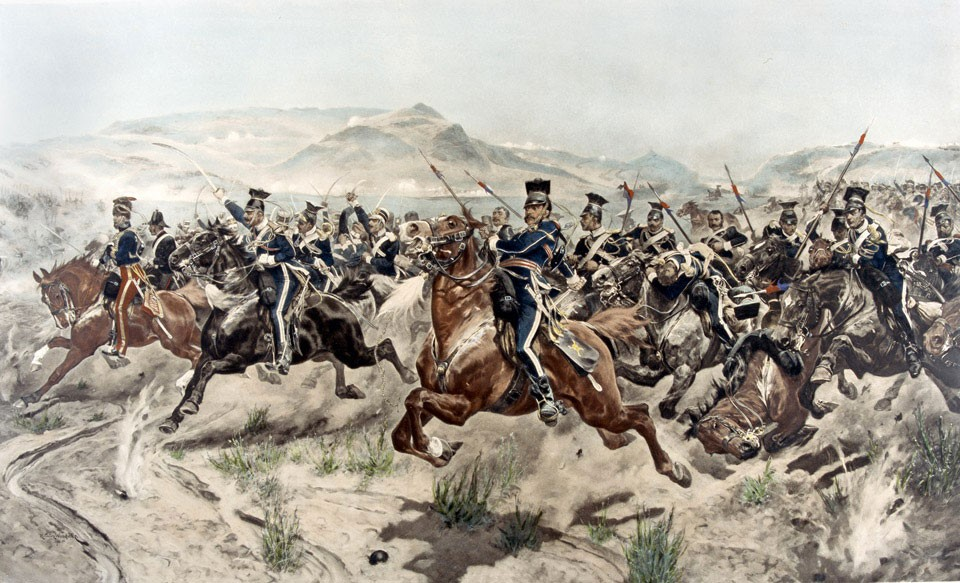
The Charge of the Light Brigade by Tennyson (painting above by Richard Caton Woodville) features a notable merism: "Cannon to right of them, / Cannon to left of them, / Cannon in front of them / Volleyed and thundered."

Merism (Latin: merismus, Ancient Greek: μερισμός, romanized: merismós) also known as merismus is a rhetorical device (or figure of speech) in which a combination of two contrasting parts of the whole refer to the whole. For example, in order to say that someone "searched everywhere," one could use the merism "searched high and low."

== Etymology ==
The term entered English in 1894 in the biological sense but had appeared earlier in rhetorical contexts in which it denoted "'synecdoche in which totality is expressed by contrasting parts' (such as high and low, young and old)." It derives from Modern Latin merismus, from Greek μερισμός (merismos) 'a dividing or partitioning,' ultimately from merizein 'to divide', from meros 'part, share'.

== Definitions ==
Most broadly, some, such as Richard Lanham, define a merism as a distribution in which one thing is split into more; this is device is instead sometimes referred to as a distribution, distributio, or the distributor. An example of this definition is found in Edmund Spenser's The Faerie Queene:

Two things he feared, but the third was death;
That fierce young mans unruly maistery;
His money, which he lov'd as living breath;
And his faire wife, whom honest long he kept uneath.

Specifying this definition, others, such as George Puttenham, define it as distributing every part of something, especially for the sake of amplification. Puttenham provides the example of describing each part of a house— the walls, the roof, the floor— being torn down instead of just stating that the house was extirpated; he goes on to quote the following Petrarchan sonnet by Henry Howard (though Puttenham attributes it to Thomas Wyatt):

Set me whereas the sunne doth parch the greene,
Or where his beames do not dissolue the yce:
In temperate heate where he is felt and seene,
In presence prest of people mad or wise:
Set me in hye or yet in low degree,
In longest night or in the shortest day:
In clearest skie, or where clouds thickest bee,
In lustie youth or when my heares are gray:
Set me in heauen, in earth or els in hell,
In hill or dale or in the foaming flood:
Thrall or at large, alive where so I dwell,
Sicke or in health, in evill fame or good:
Hers will I be, and onely with this thought,
Content my selfe, although my chaunce be naught.

Which Puttenham argues could have been said in two verses:

Set me wherefoever ye will
I am and wilbe yours still.

A merism can also be defined as an inclusive spectrum defined by some of its parts. For example, to search "high and low" is to search medium elevations as well as the extremes. Some definitions specifies that a merism must contain only two contrasting elements; a merism with this definition is sometimes referred to as a universalizing doublet. One should establish, however, that a merism must contain at least two elements, as it is distinct from a synecdoche (or specifically a pars pro toto) which uses a singular term to refer to the whole.

== Examples ==
=== In common phrases ===
- "ladies and gentlemen" refers to all people
- "night and day" refers to always
- "sun, sea, and sand" refers to a tropical or beachy experience (as this contains three elements, it is debatable whether it is meristic)
- "alpha and omega" refers to totality, not just the beginning and the end
- "Flesh and bone" or "heart and soul" refer to one's whole person or existence
- "For better for worse, for richer for poorer, in sickness and in health, until death do us part" is a common statement in a marriage vow that means "in all circumstances," not just sometimes

=== In literature ===
- "Cannon to the right of them, Cannon to the left of them, Cannon in front of them" — Tennyson, The Charge of the Light Brigade
- "There is a working class—strong and happy—among both rich and poor; there is an idle class—weak, wicked, and miserable—among both rich and poor" — John Ruskin, The Crown of Wild Olive
- "Young lions and pumas are marked with feeble stripes or rows of spots, and as many allied species both young and old are similarly marked, no believer in evolution will doubt that the progenitor of the lion and puma was a striped animal" — Charles Darwin, The Descent of Man and Selection in Relation to Sex

=== In the Bible ===
Merisms are especially common in the bible, particularly the Old Testament:

- "In the beginning, God created the heavens and the earth" — Genesis 1:1 (refers to the entire universe)
- "God called the light 'day,' and the darkness he called 'night.' And there was evening, and there was morning—the first day" — Genesis 1:5
- "But you must not eat from the tree of the knowledge of good and evil, for when you eat from it you will certainly die" — Genesis 2:17
- "The Lord will watch over your coming and going both now and forevermore" — Psalm 121:8
- "Thou knowest my downsitting and mine uprising, thou understandest my thought afar off" — Psalm 139:2 (refers to all of the psalmist's actions)
- "The eyes of the Lord are everywhere, keeping watch on the wicked and the good" — Proverbs 15:3

In some cases, whether a statement is meristic can be debated. For example, Genesis 1:27— "so God created humankind in his image, in the image of God he created them; male and female he created them—" the text may refer to strictly "male" and "female" or refer to a broader spectrum inclusive of intersex individuals.

== Biological usage ==
In biology, a merism is a repetition of similar parts in the structure of an organism. Such features are called meristic characters, and the study of such characters is called meristics. An example is in flowers in considering the number of parts in each whorl of organs from which they are constructed.

== Legal usage ==
Merisms frequently figure in the writing of lawyers and are a hallmark of legal style. The two parts of the legal merism "Last Will and Testament" at one time referred to two documents, which were enforced in two separate courts. The will disposed of a decedent's real property, and the testament disposed of chattels. It became customary to combine the instruments in a single dispositive document, and the name has continued long after the doctrines that had required its use became obsolete in common law.

A lawyer who writes a will typically includes a residuary clause that disposes of any property not covered by a prior section. The weight of tradition is such that the lawyer writing such a document will often phrase it something like this:

I bequeath, convey, and devise the rest, residue, and remainder of my property, whether real or personal, and wheresoever it may be situated, to...

Traditionally, a gift of real property was called a "devise", and a gift of other property was a "bequest". Nowadays, the words "bequeath" and "devise" are synonymous in most jurisdictions and so "I bequeath the rest of my property to..." is enough in both law and logic to achieve the same result. Many deeds frequently contain a traditional clause that says that the grantee is "to have and to hold" the property conveyed. That usage goes back to the days in which the instruments were drawn up in Latin, and is sometimes called a "habendam et tenendam" clause. The use of legal merisms seldom, if ever, adds legal effect to the documents that contain them, but it frequently increases their reading difficulty. However, the weight of tradition and the fear of a deviation from the established formula having unintended legal consequences make lawyers reluctant to revise the traditional formulae, and their clients, seeing them, at least draw the satisfaction of knowing that their documents appear to be written by a lawyer.

In some cases, the doubling (or even tripling) of constituent parts in the meristic constructions arose as a result of the transition of legal discourse from Latin to French and then from French to English. During such periods, key terms were paired with synonyms from multiple languages in an attempt to prevent ambiguity and ensure hermeneutic consistency.

== See also ==
- Dvandva
- Blazon
- Hendiadys – Conjunction for emphasis
- Synecdoche, referring to a whole by the name of one of its parts (or vice versa):
  - Pars pro toto, where the part is used to refer to the whole.
  - Totum pro parte, where the whole is used to refer to a part.
