= Synecdoche =

Figure of speech

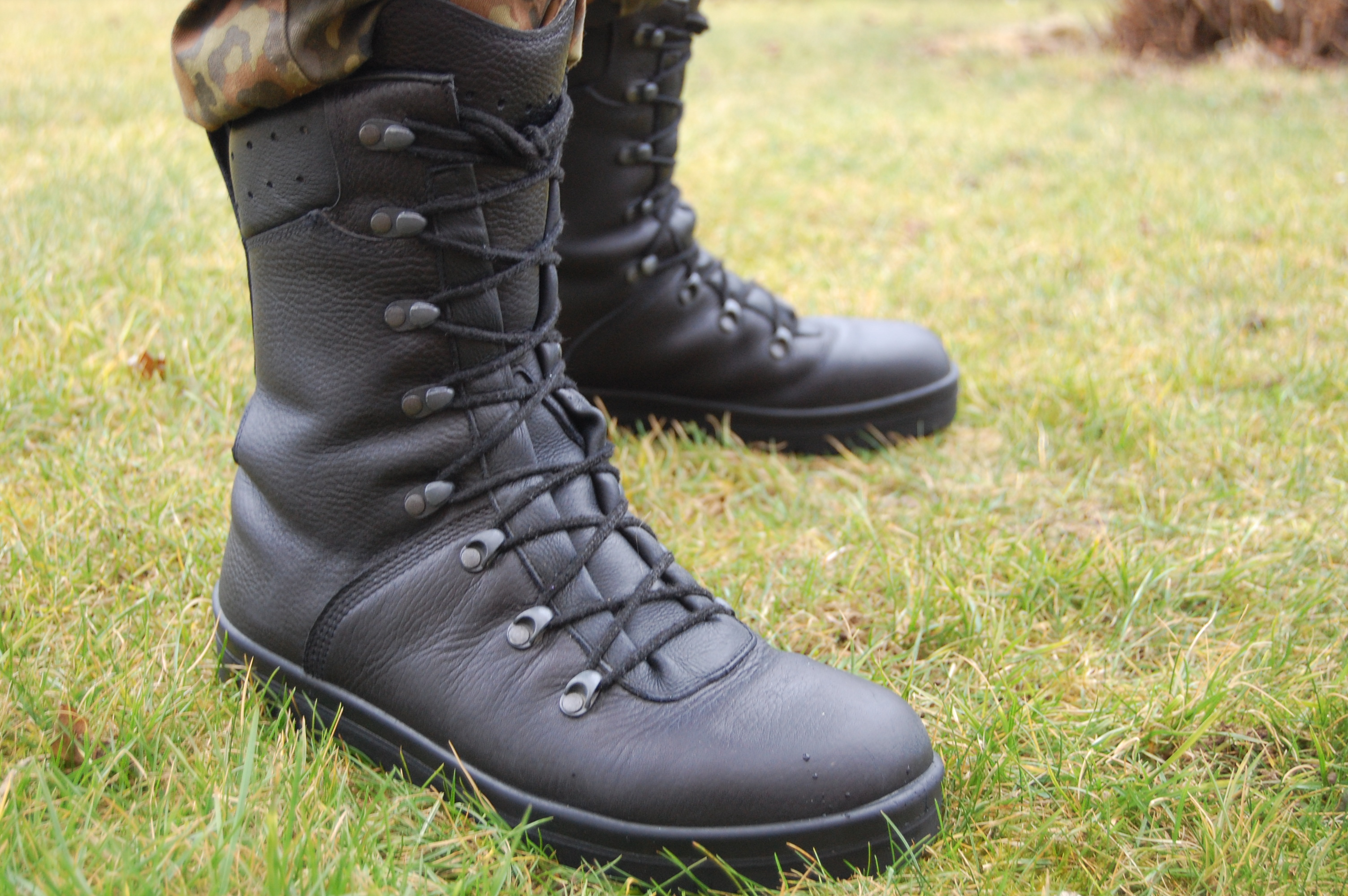
A common example of synecdoche: using the term boots to mean "soldiers", as in the phrase "boots on the ground".

Synecdoche (/sɪˈnɛkdəki/) is a type of metonymy; it is a figure of speech that uses a term for a part of something to refer to the whole (pars pro toto), or vice versa (totum pro parte). The term is derived from Ancient Greek συνεκδοχή (sunekdokhḗ) 'simultaneous understanding'. (Note: From ἐκδέχομαι (ekdékhomai) 'to take or receive from another' – simplex δέχομαι (dékhomai) 'to receive'. In simpler words, the term comes from Greek Syn, meaning "with" or "along with" (as in synonym) and ekdoche, meaning sense or interpretation; thus literally, "interpret along with") Common English synecdoches include suits for businessmen, wheels for automobile, and boots for soldiers.

== Definition ==
Synecdoche is a rhetorical trope and a kind of metonymy—a figure of speech using a term to denote one thing to refer to a related thing.

Synecdoche (and thus metonymy) is distinct from metaphor, although in the past, it was considered a sub-species of metaphor, intending metaphor as a type of conceptual substitution (as Quintilian does in Institutio oratoria Book VIII). In Lanham's Handlist of Rhetorical Terms, the three terms possess somewhat restrictive definitions in tune with their etymologies from Greek:

- Metaphor: changing a word from its literal meaning to one not properly applicable but analogous to it; assertion of identity (A is B)—rather than likeness as with simile (A is like B);
- Metonymy: substituting an attribute of or object associated with something for the thing itself (e.g., substituting "the crown" for "the monarch" is not a synecdoche, since "the crown" is not part of "the monarch").

== Classification ==
Synecdoche is often used as a type of personification by attaching a human aspect to a nonhuman thing. It is used in reference to political relations, including "having a footing", to mean a country or organization is in a position to act, or "the wrong hands", to describe opposing groups, usually in the context of military power.

The two main types of synecdoche are microcosm and macrocosm. A microcosm uses a part of something to refer to the entirety. An example of this is saying "I need a hand" with a project, but needing the entire person. A macrocosm is the opposite, using the name of the entire structure of something to refer to a small part. An example of this is saying "the world" while referring to a certain country or part of the planet. The figure of speech is divided into the image (what the speaker uses to refer to something) and the subject (what is referred to).

Sonnets and other forms of love poetry frequently use synecdoches to characterize the beloved in terms of individual body parts rather than a coherent whole. This practice is especially common in the Petrarchan sonnet, where the idealised beloved is often described part by part, head-to-toe.

Synecdoche is also popular in advertising. Since synecdoche uses a part to represent a whole, its use requires the audience to make associations and "fill in the gaps", engaging with the ad by thinking about the product. Moreover, catching the attention of an audience with advertising is often referred to by advertisers with the synecdoche "getting eyeballs". Synecdoche is common in spoken English, especially in reference to sports. The names of cities are used as shorthand for their sports teams to describe events and their outcomes, such as "Denver won Monday's game," while accuracy would require specifying the sports team's name.

Kenneth Burke (1945), an American literary theorist, declared that in rhetoric, the four master tropes, or figures of speech, are metaphor, metonymy, synecdoche, and irony. Burke's primary concern with these four master tropes is more than simply their figurative usage, but includes their role in the discovery and description of the truth. He described synecdoche as "part for the whole, whole for the part, container for the contained, sign for the thing signified, material for the thing made ... cause for the effect, effect for the cause, genus for the species, species for the genus". In addition, Burke suggests synecdoche patterns can include reversible pairs such as disease-cure. Burke proclaimed the noblest synecdoche is found in the description of "microcosm and macrocosm" since microcosm is related to macrocosm as part to the whole, and either the whole can represent the part or the part can represent the whole". Burke compares synecdoche with the concept of "representation", especially in the political sense in which elected representatives stand in pars pro toto for their electorate.

== See also ==
- Antonomasia
- Bahuvrihi
- Category mistake
- Conceptual metaphor
- Hendiadys
- Holonymy
- Hyponymy
- Merism
- Meronymy
- Metonymy
- Faulty generalization (List of fallacies § Faulty generalizations)
- Fallacy of division
- Symbol
