= Ladies and gentlemen (salutation) =

Salutation

Ladies and gentlemen is a salutation and irreversible binomial used in the field of entertainment, sports and theatre since the 19th century. The salutation is unlike most English-language gendered irreversible binomials which typically place the male term before the female term. Before the 19th century, the terms "gentil men and ladies" and "gentlemen and ladies" were more common, and according to prevalence in 18th-century newspapers and usage in the Oxford English Dictionary, the shift in popularity to the form "ladies and gentlemen" occurred during the late 18th century.

Since the 1950s, male-first irreversible binomials have become less fixed (i.e. the male and female term are more freely interchanged) but the usage of female-first irreversible binomials has become more fixed. The use of the fixed ordering has been described as unnecessarily gendered, and binary (see gender binary).

"Ladies and gentlemen" is also an example of a merism: the phrase does not refer to only those who are ladies or gentlemen, but refers to all people.

== See also ==
- Women and children first, a similar principle in maritime history
