= Dvandva =

Type of linguistic compound

A dvandva (from द्वंद्व dvaṃdvá 'pair' in Sanskrit) is a linguistic compound in which multiple individual nouns are concatenated to form a compound word to form a new word with a distinct meaning. For instance, the individual words 'brother' and 'sister' may in some languages be agglomerated to 'brothersister' to express "siblings". The grammatical number of such constructs is often plural or dual.

The term dvandva was borrowed from Sanskrit, a language in which these compounds are common. Dvandvas also exist in Avestan, the Old Iranian language related to Sanskrit, as well as in numerous Indo-Aryan languages descended from the Prakrits. Several far-eastern languages such as Chinese, Japanese, Atong (a Tibeto-Burman language of India and Bangladesh) and Korean also have dvandvas. Dvandvas may also be found occasionally in European languages, but are relatively rare.

Examples include:

- Atong achu-ambi ("grandfather-grandmother") for "ancestors".
- Azerbaijani ər-arvad ("husband-wife") for "married couple".
- Basque anai-arrebak ("brothers and sisters").
- Chinese: 山川; pinyin: shānchuān and Japanese yamakawa (山川), for "landscape, scenery" (lit. "mountains and rivers").
- Finnic maailma, maailm ("land-air") for "world".
- Friulian marimont ("sea-world") for "the entire world, the universe".
- Georgian: დედ-მამა (ded-mama) (lit. mother-father) for parents, და-ძმა (da-dzma) (lit. sister-brother) for siblings
- Modern Greek μαχαιροπήρουνο /maçeɾoˈpiɾuno/ for "cutlery" (lit. "fork-knife"), ανδρόγυνο /anˈðɾoʝino/ for "married couple" (lit. "husband-wife").
- Leti leli masa (lit. 'ivory gold') for "treasure"
- Sanskrit mātāpitarau "parents" (lit. 'mother-father').
- Nahuatl in xochitl in cuicatl (lit. 'the flower, the song') for "poetry"
- Yiddish טאַטעמאַמע tatemame (papa-mama) for "parents".

Dvandvas should not be confused with agglutination, which also concatenates words but is a different process.

== Sanskrit ==
There are two or three kinds of dvandva compounds in Sanskrit, depending on classification.

=== Itaretara dvandva ===
The first, and most common kind, the itaretara (<itara-itara) dvandva, is an enumerative compound word, the meaning of which refers to all its constituent members. The resultant compound word is in the dual or plural depending on the total number of described individuals. It takes the gender of the final member in the compound construction. Examples:

- rāma-lakṣmaṇau (dual) "Rama and Lakshmana"
- Hariharau (dual) "Hari and Hara (Shiva)"
- ācārya-śiṣyau (dual) 'teacher and student'
- rāma-lakṣmaṇa-bharata-śatrughnāh (plural) "Rama, Lakshmana, Bharata and Shatrughna"
- nar-āśva-ratha-dantinaḥ (plural) "men, horses, chariots, and elephants"
- deva-manuṣyāḥ (plural) "gods and humans"

Compare Greek Αβαρόσλαβοι /avaˈɾoslavi/ "the Avars and the Slavs (two distinct tribes acting as a unit)", similarly with case and number marking displayed only on the last part of the compound, the first having the form of the word root)

Itaretaras formed from two kinship terms behave differently, in that the first word is not in the compound form but in the nominative (singular).

- mātā-pitarau "mother and father"

=== Samāhāra dvandva ===
The second, rarer kind is called samāhāra dvandva and is a collective compound word, the meaning of which refers to the collection of its constituent members. The resultant compound word is in the singular number and is always neuter in gender. Examples:

- pāṇipādam 'limbs', literally 'hands and feet', from pāṇi 'hand' and pāda 'foot'

Compare Modern Greek ανδρόγυνο /anˈðɾoʝino/ "husband and wife" or μαχαιροπίρουνο /maçeɾoˈpiɾuno/ "cutlery" (literally "knife-forks"), similarly always in the neuter singular (plural marking would refer to several couples or cutlery sets).

=== Ekaśeṣa dvandva ===
According to some grammarians, there is a third kind called ekaśeṣa dvandva "residual compound". It is formed like an itaretara, but the first constituent is omitted. The remaining final constituent still takes the dual (or plural) number. According to other grammarians, however, the ekaśeṣa is not properly a compound at all. An example:

- pitarau 'parents', from mātā 'mother' + pitā 'father'

== In Japanese ==
Japanese has a number of dvandva compounds, such as native Japonic 親子 (oyako, "parent and child") and 乗り降り (noriori, "getting in and out, e.g., of a vehicle"), and Chinese-derived 天地 (tenchi, "heaven and earth"). While most Japanese compounds are composed of one element modifying another element, dvandva compounds are composed of elements that coordinate to refer to a concept.

Dvandva compounds differ from other Japanese compounds because they often do not undergo rendaku when the compound meets the normal phonological and morphological conditions for it. For example, while 親子 (oyako) has the correct composition for a rendaku sound change, and does not fall under the Lyman's Law exception, the onset of the second element is not voiced.

== See also ==
- Bahuvrihi
- Difrasismo
- Merism
