= Bastion =

Outward structure of a fortification

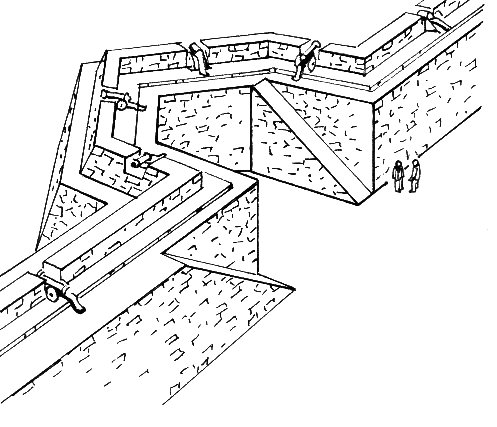
Drawing of a bastion

A bastion is a structure projecting outward from the curtain wall of a fortification, most commonly angular in shape and positioned at the corners of the fort. The fully developed bastion consists of two faces and two flanks, with fire from the flanks being able to protect the curtain wall and the adjacent bastions. Compared with the medieval fortified towers they replaced, bastion fortifications offered a greater degree of passive resistance and more scope for ranged defence in the age of gunpowder artillery. As military architecture, the bastion is one element in the style of fortification dominant from the mid 16th to mid 19th centuries.

== Evolution ==
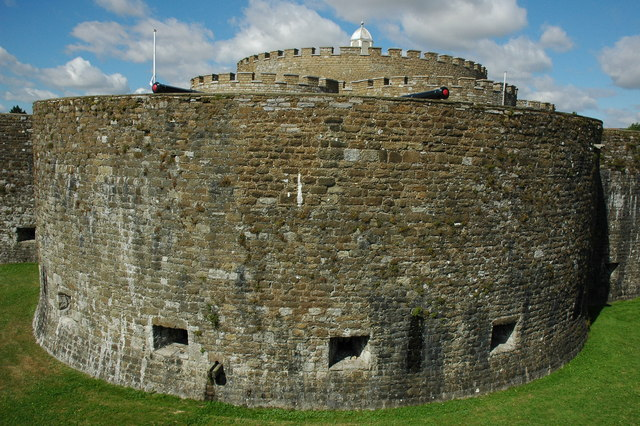
One of the semi-circular bastions at Deal Castle, a Device Fort on the south coast of England

By the middle of the 15th century, artillery pieces had become powerful enough to make the traditional medieval round tower and curtain wall obsolete. This was exemplified by the campaigns of Charles VII of France who reduced the towns and castles held by the English during the latter stages of the Hundred Years War, and by the fall of Constantinople in 1453 to the large cannons of the Turkish army.

During the Eighty Years War (1568–1648) Dutch military engineers developed the concepts further by lengthening the faces and shortening the curtain walls of the bastions. The resulting construction was called a bolwerk. To augment this change they placed v-shaped outworks known as ravelins in front of the bastions and curtain walls to protect them from direct artillery fire.

These ideas were further developed and incorporated into the trace italienne forts by Sébastien Le Prestre de Vauban, that remained in use during the Napoleonic Wars.

== Effectiveness ==
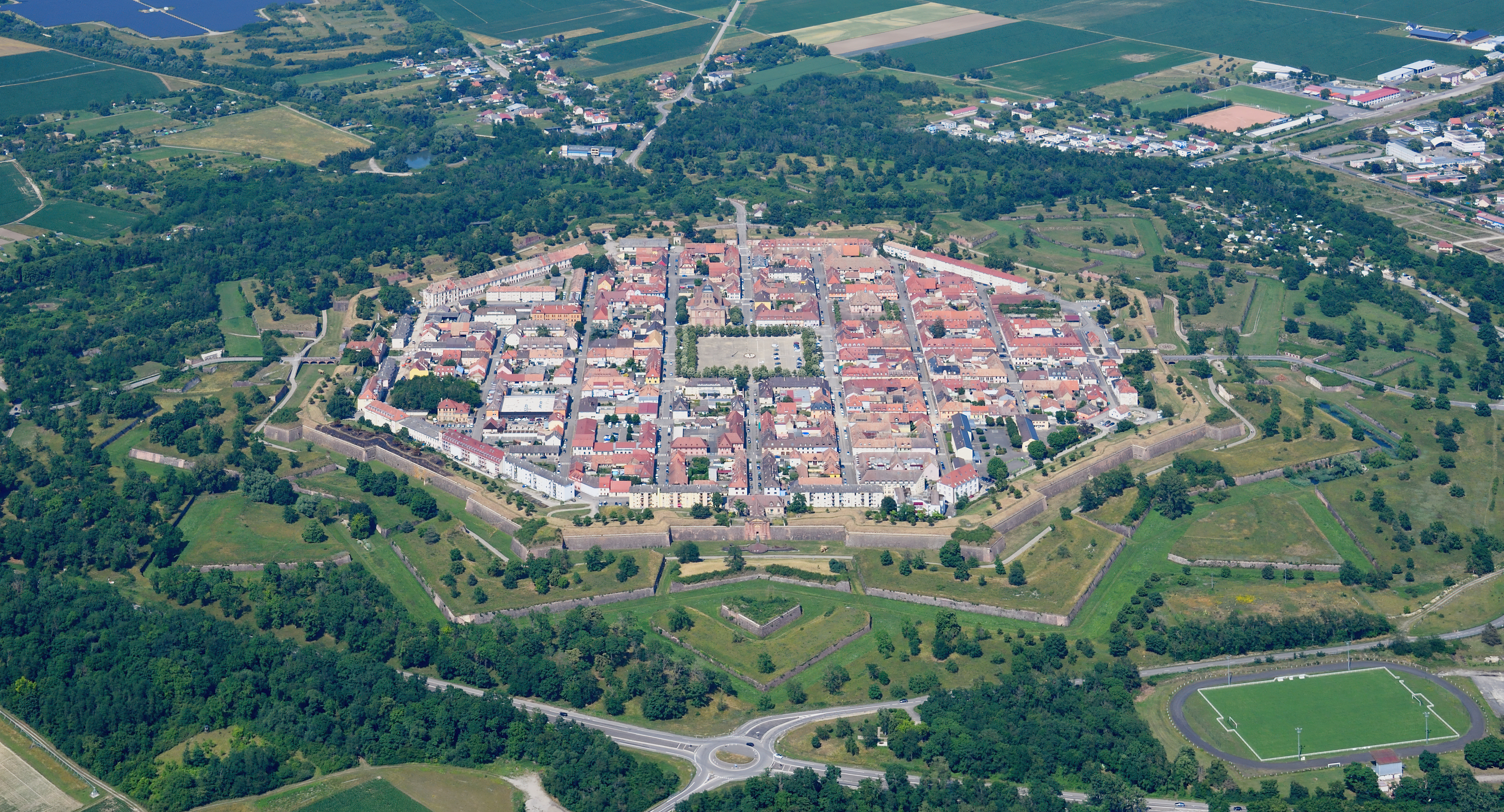
Aerial photograph of Neuf-Brisach, a fortress in use during the Napoleonic Wars

Bastions differ from medieval towers in a number of respects. Bastions are lower than towers and are normally of similar height to the adjacent curtain wall. The height of towers, although making them difficult to scale, also made them easy for artillery to destroy. A bastion would normally have a ditch in front, the opposite side of which would be built up above the natural level then slope away gradually. This glacis shielded most of the bastion from the attacker's cannon while the distance from the base of the ditch to the top of the bastion meant it was still difficult to scale.

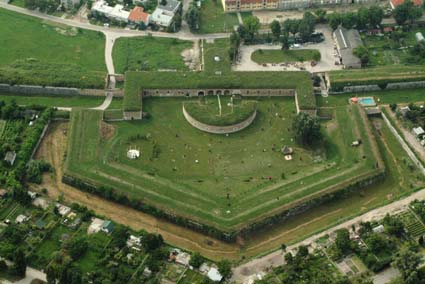
A bastion in the Komárno Fortress (Slovakia).

In contrast to typical late medieval towers, bastions (apart from early examples) were flat sided rather than curved. This eliminated dead ground making it possible for the defenders to fire upon any point directly in front of the bastion.

Bastions also cover a larger area than most towers. This allows more cannons to be mounted and provided enough space for the crews to operate them.

Surviving examples of bastions are usually faced with masonry. Unlike the wall of a tower this was just a retaining wall; cannonballs were expected to pass through this and be absorbed by a greater thickness of hard-packed earth or rubble behind. The top of the bastion was exposed to enemy fire, and normally would not be faced with masonry as cannonballs hitting the surface would scatter lethal stone shards among the defenders.

If a bastion was successfully stormed, it could provide the attackers with a stronghold from which to launch further attacks. Some bastion designs attempted to minimise this problem. This could be achieved by the use of retrenchments in which a trench was dug across the rear (gorge) of the bastion, isolating it from the main rampart.

== Types ==
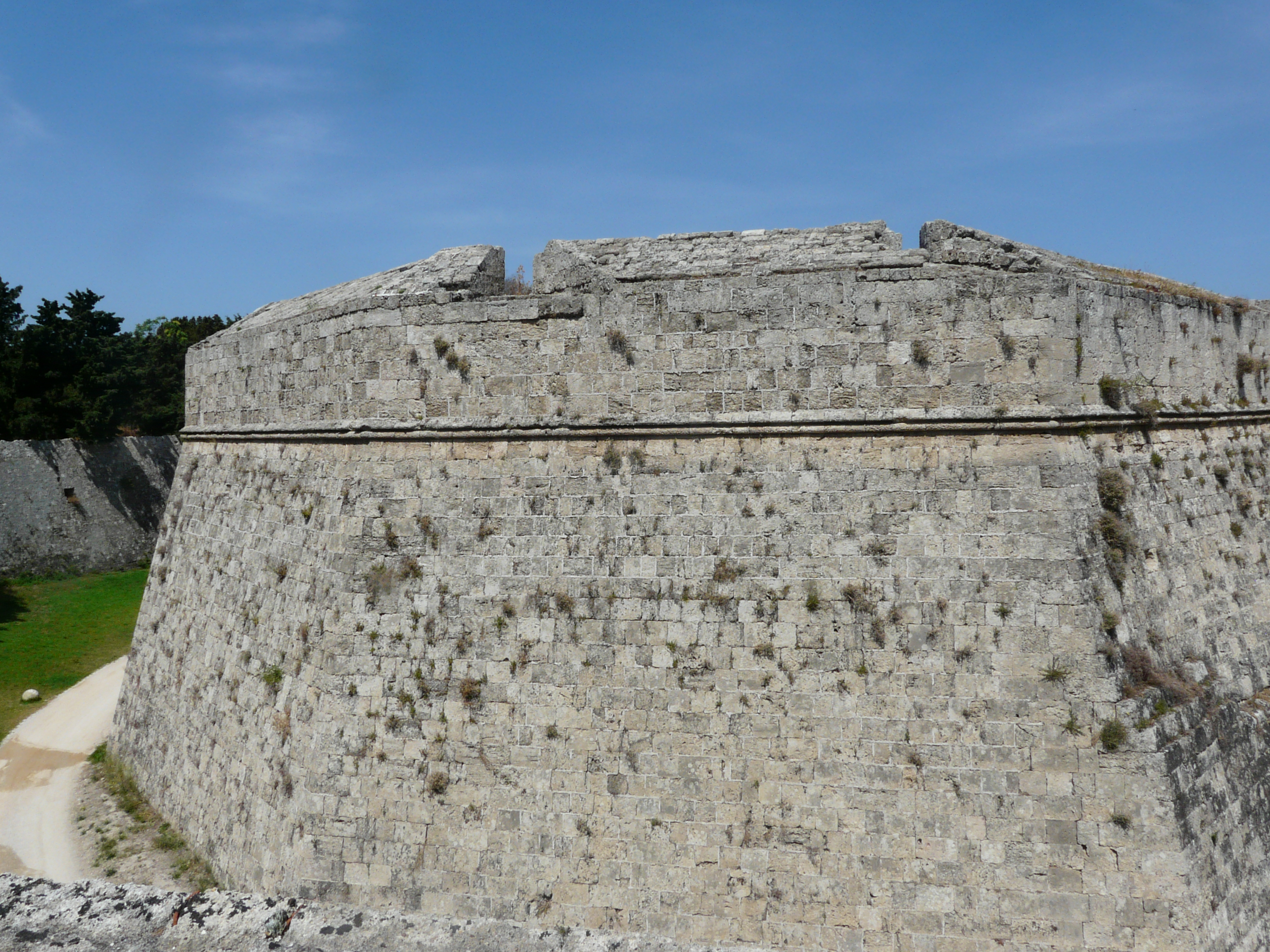
Some of the first polygonal bastions that would define the trace italienne were built at Rhodes between 1486 and 1497.

Various kinds of bastions have been used throughout history:

- Solid bastions are those that are filled up entirely and have the ground even with the height of the rampart, without any empty space towards the centre.
- Void or hollow bastions are those that have a rampart, or parapet, only around their flanks and faces, so that a void space is left towards the centre. The ground is so low, that if the rampart is taken, no retrenchment can be made in the centre, but what will lie under the fire of the besieged.
- A flat bastion is one built in the middle of a curtain, or enclosed court, when the court is too large to be defended by the bastions at its extremes.
- A cut bastion is that which has a re-entering angle at the point. It was sometimes also called bastion with a tenaille. Such bastions were used, when without such a structure, the angle would be too acute. The term cut bastion is also used for one that is cut off from the place by some ditch.
- A composed bastion is when the two sides of the interior polygon are very unequal, which also makes the gorges unequal.
- A regular bastion is that which has proportionate faces, flanks, and gorges.
- A deformed or irregular bastion is one which lacks one of its demi-gorges; one side of the interior polygon being too short.
- A demi-bastion has only one face and flank. To fortify the angle of a place that is too acute, they cut the point, and place two demi-bastions, which make a tenaille, or re-entry angle. Their chief use is before a hornwork or crownwork.

== Gallery ==
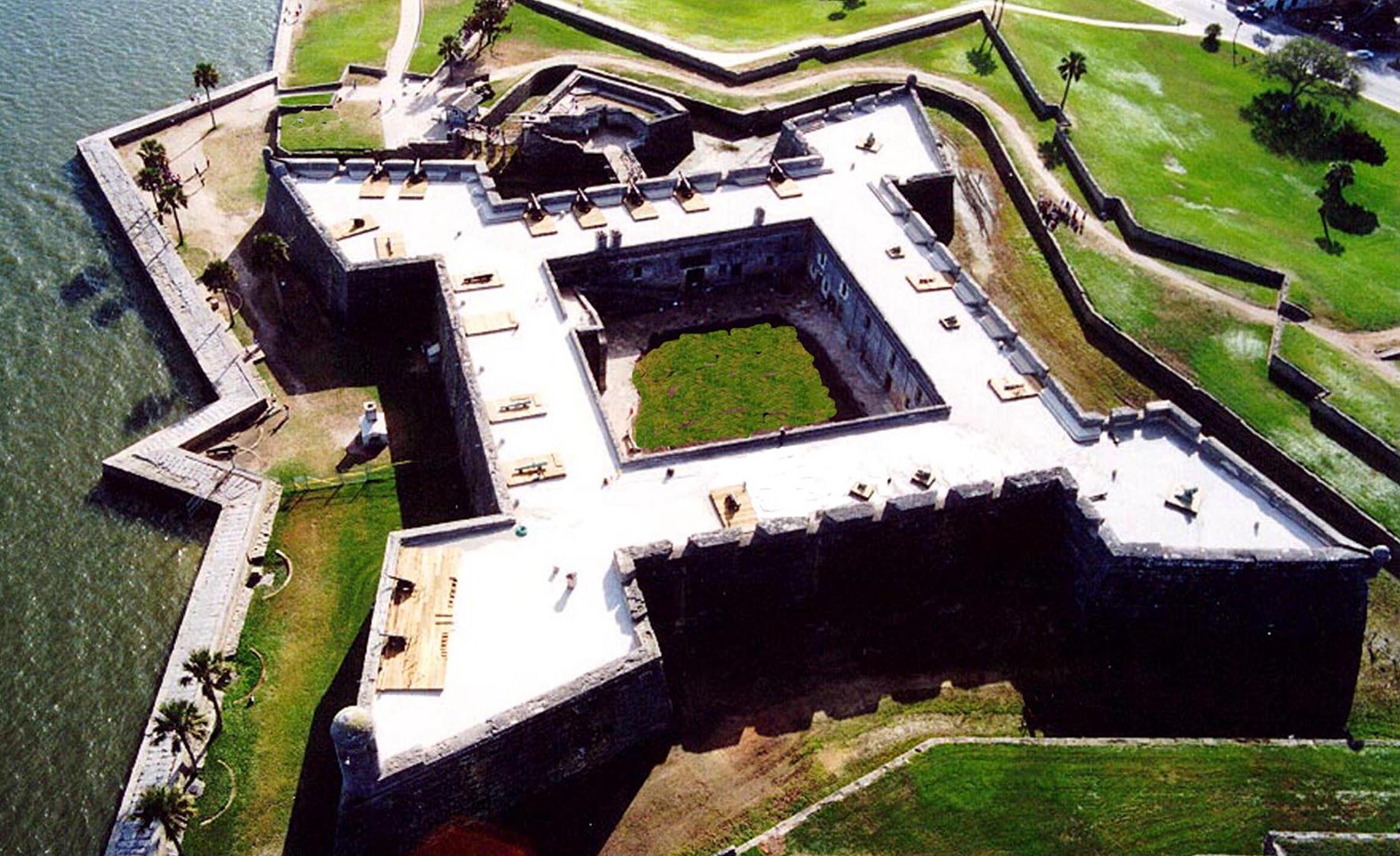
Castillo de San Marcos (completed 1695), Florida. Four-bastion fortress.

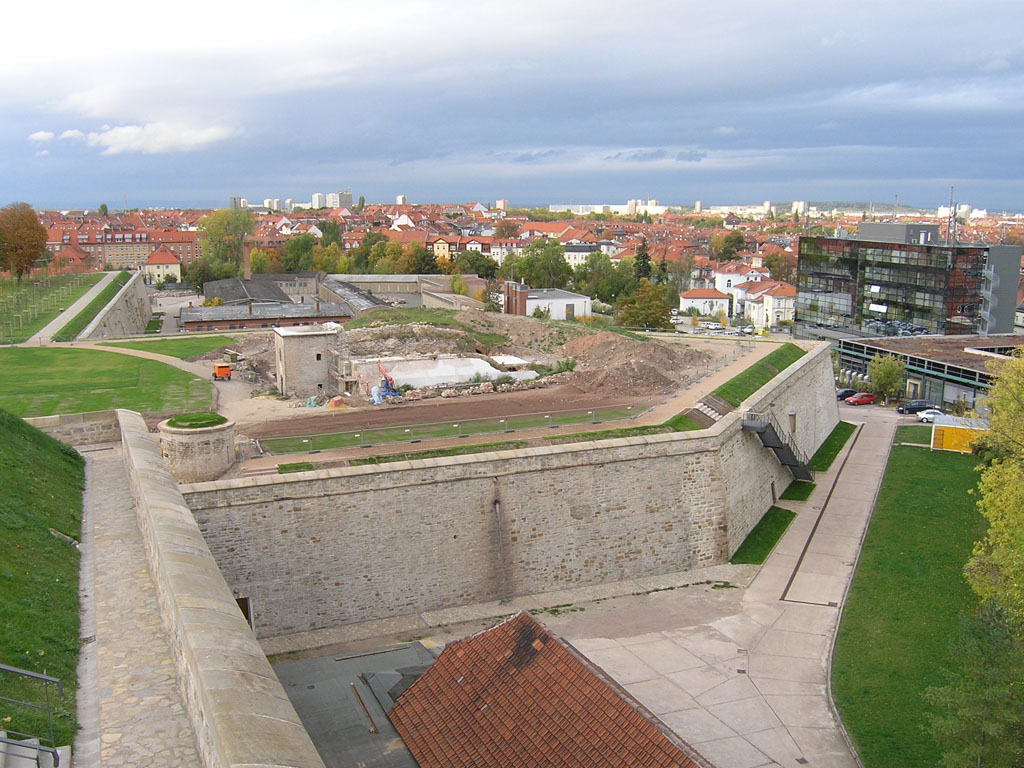
Bastion Franz (c.1675), Petersberg Citadel, Erfurt, Germany

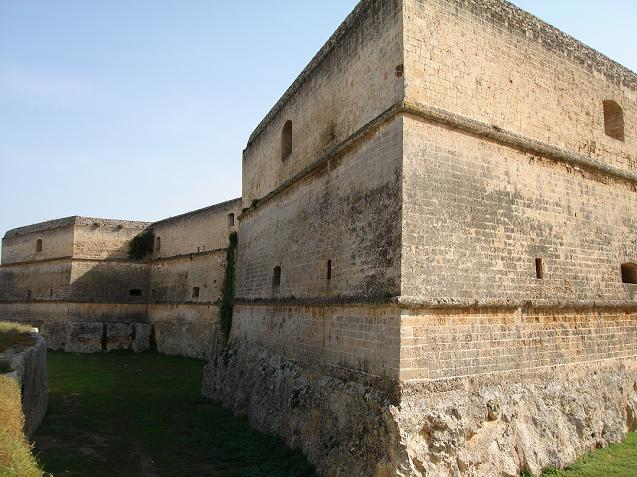
One of the bastions of the castle of Copertino (1540), Italy

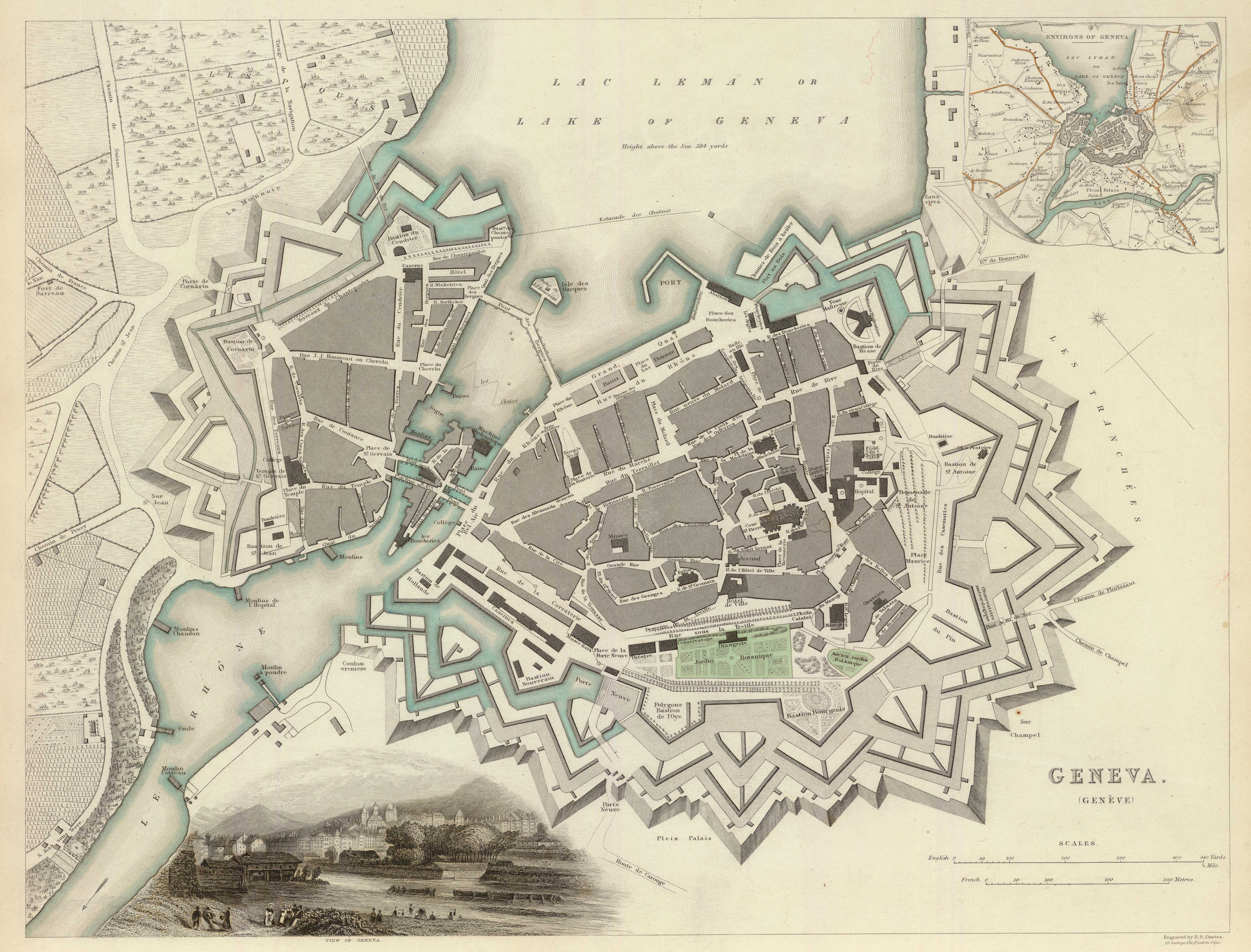
Plan of Geneva and environs in 1841. The colossal fortifications, incorporating numerous bastions and among the most important in Europe, were demolished ten years later.

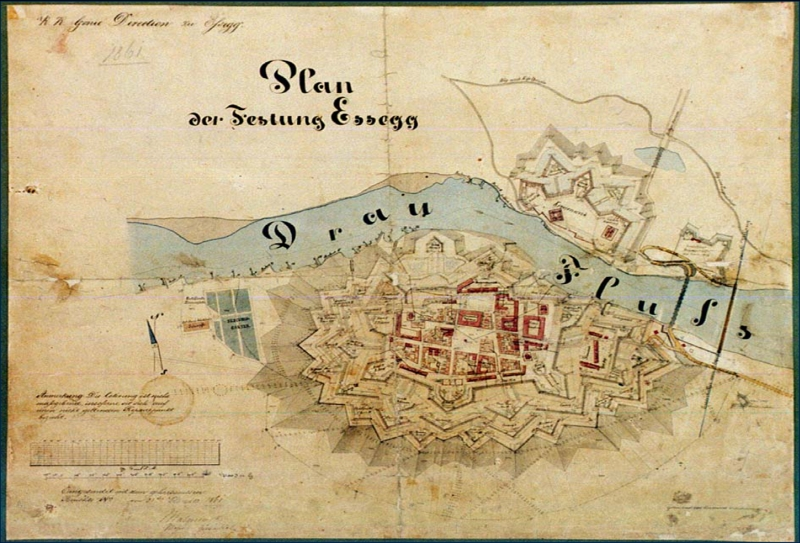
Plan of Tvrđa from 1861, in Osijek, Croatia. While the fortifications have largely been removed, some bastions are still preserved.

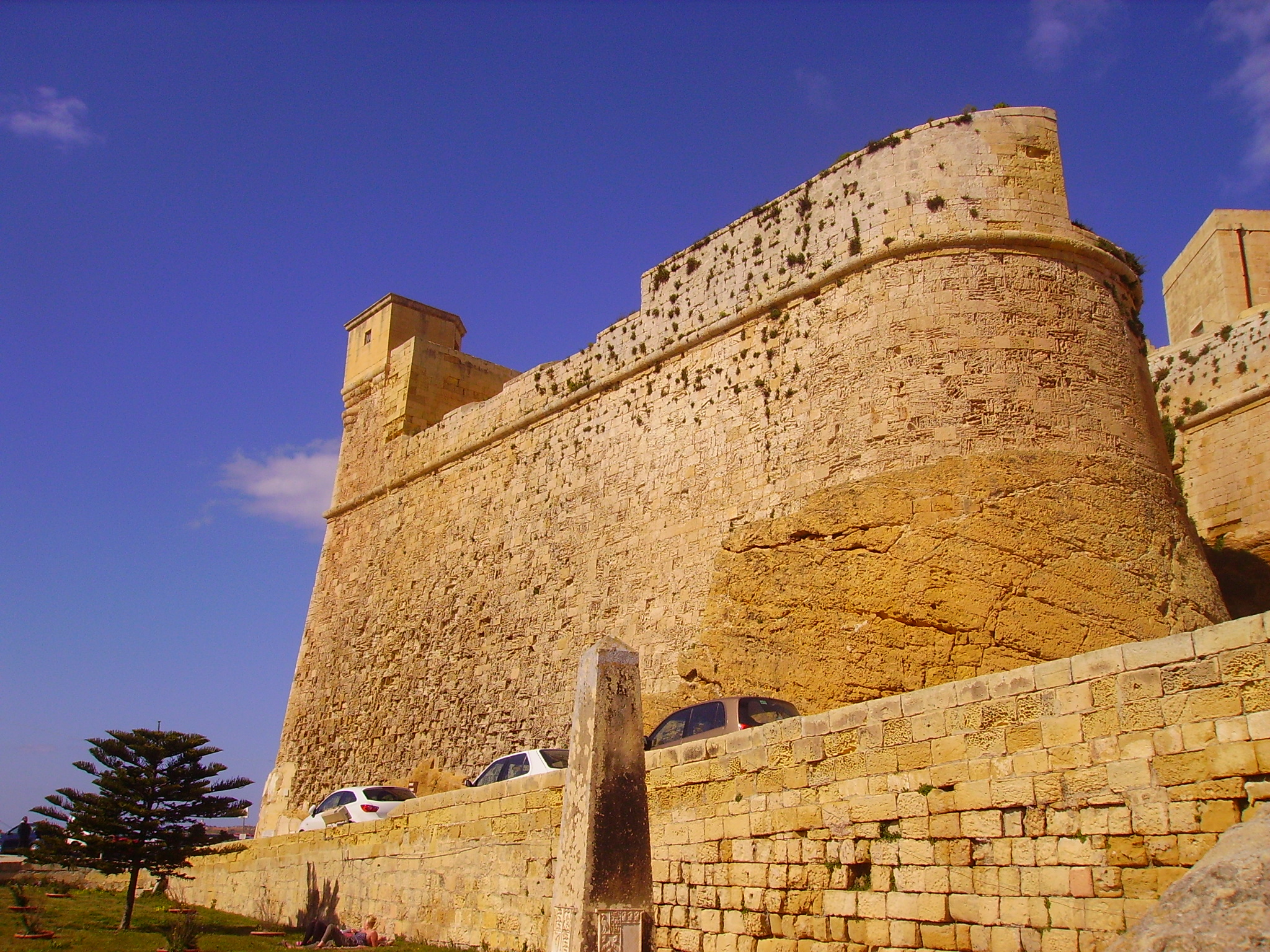
St. Martin's Demi-Bastion in the Cittadella (1614), Gozo, Malta

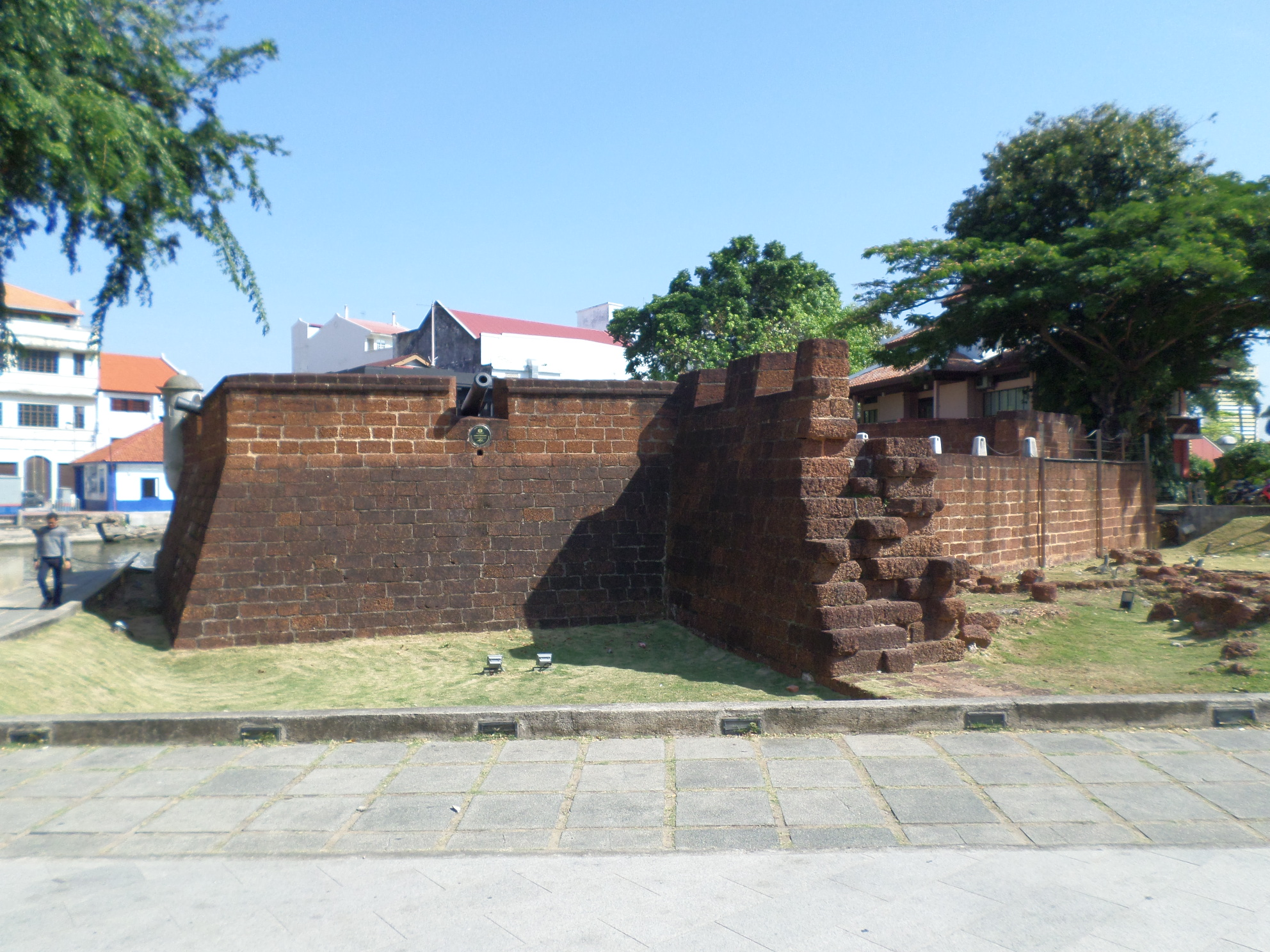
Bastion Middleburg in Malacca, Malaysia

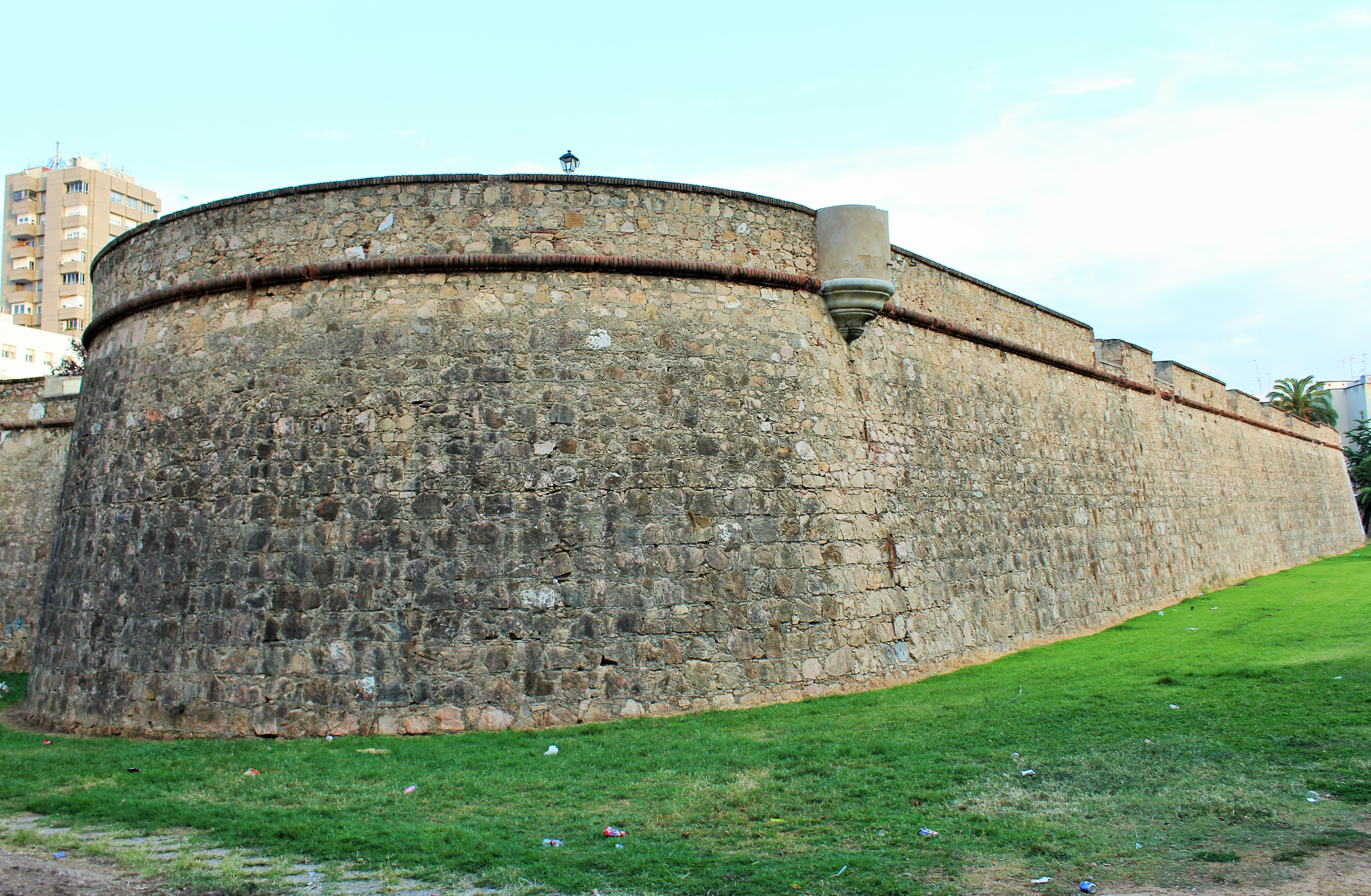
Bastion in Badajoz, Spain

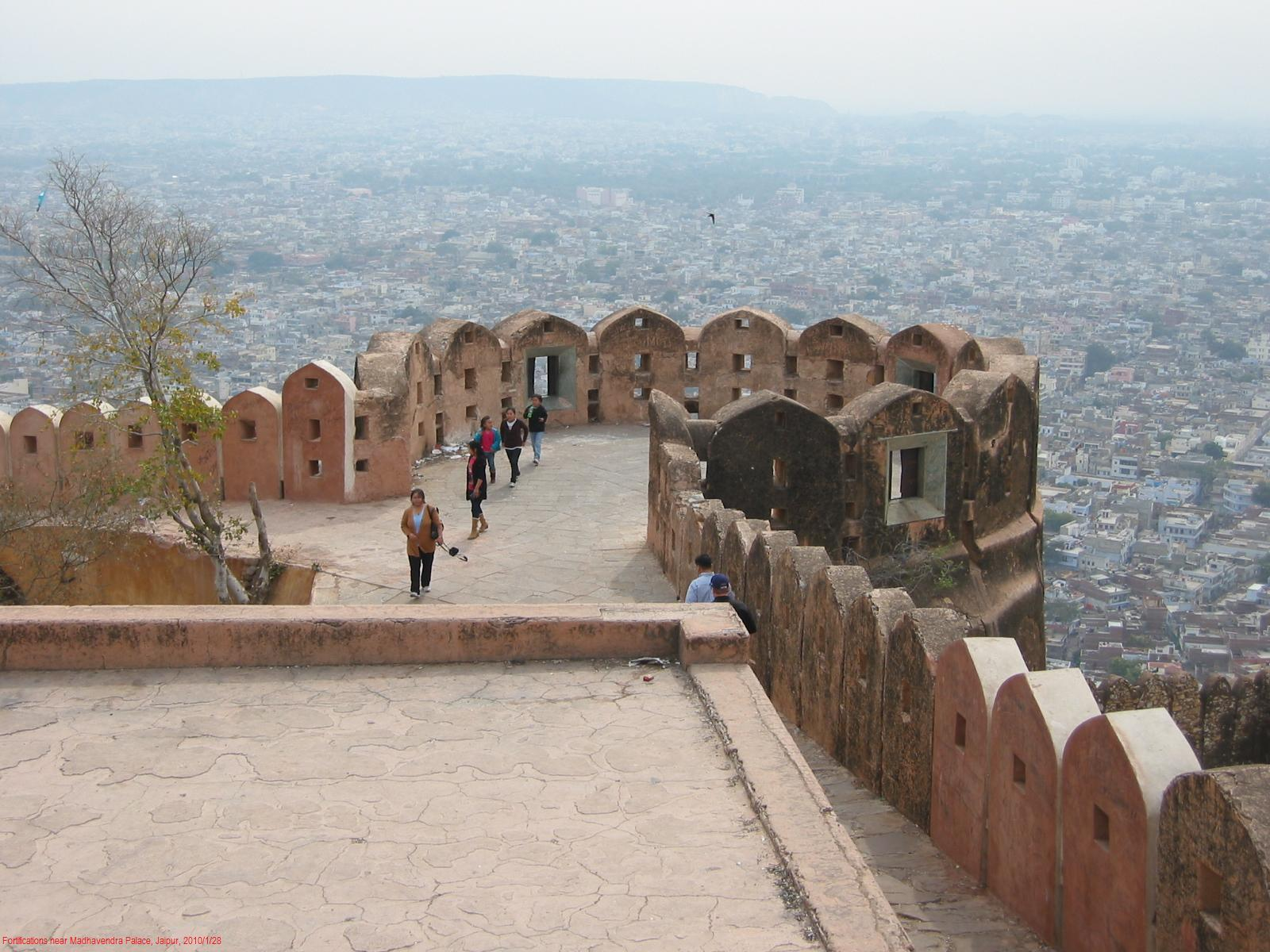
A bastion at Nahargarh Fort in Jaipur, India

== See also ==
- Bastille
- Battery tower
- Roundel
- Bastion host
