= Metonymy =

Figure of speech

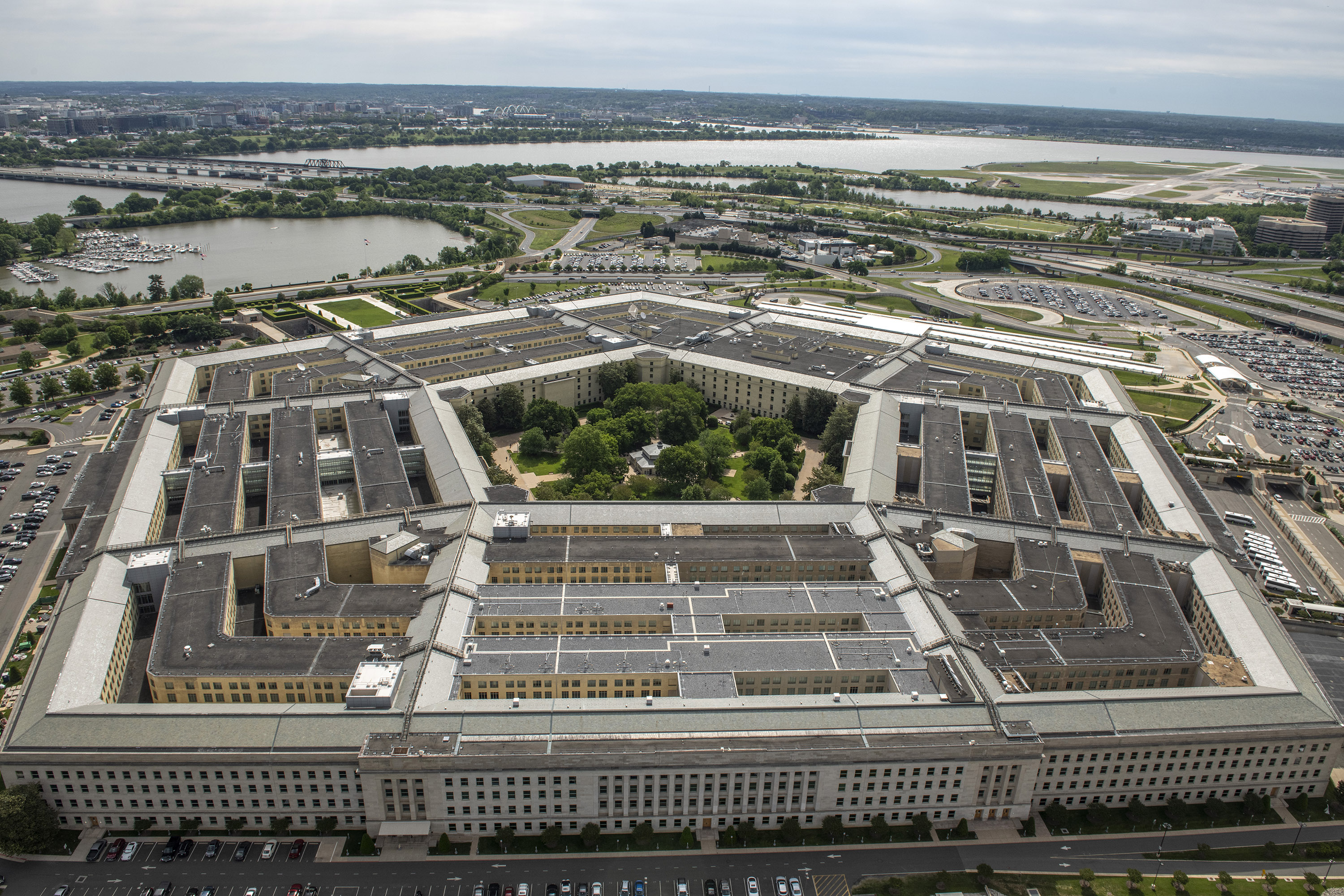
The Pentagon is the headquarters building of the United States Department of Defense and is a common metonym for the US military and its leadership

Metonymy (/mɪˈtɒnɪmi, mɛ-/) is a figure of speech in which a concept is referred to by the name of something associated with that thing or concept. For example, the word "suit" may refer to a person from groups commonly seen wearing business attire, such as business executives, bankers, or lawyers.

Metonyms are common in everyday speech and encapsulate a range of other ideas, such as synecdoche and metalepsis. Metonyms are similar to metaphors but where metaphors rely on analogous characteristics to form a comparison, a metonymy is caused by general association of the two objects of comparison.

== Etymology ==
The words metonymy and metonym come from Ancient Greek μετωνυμία (metōnumía) 'a change of name'; from μετά (metá) 'after, post, beyond' and -ωνυμία (-ōnumía), a suffix that names figures of speech, from ὄνυμα (ónuma) or ὄνομα (ónoma) 'name'.

== Background ==
Metonymy and related figures of speech are common in everyday speech and writing. Synecdoche and metalepsis are considered specific types of metonymy. Polysemy, the capacity for a word or phrase to have multiple meanings, sometimes results from relations of metonymy. Both metonymy and metaphor involve the substitution of one term for another. In metaphor, this substitution is based on some specific analogy between two things, whereas in metonymy the substitution is based on some understood association or contiguity.

American literary theorist Kenneth Burke considers metonymy as one of four "master tropes": metaphor, metonymy, synecdoche, and irony. He discusses them in particular ways in his book A Grammar of Motives. Whereas Roman Jakobson argued that the fundamental dichotomy in trope was between metaphor and metonymy, Burke argues that the fundamental dichotomy is between irony and synecdoche, which he also describes as the dichotomy between dialectic and representation, or again between reduction and perspective.

In addition to its use in everyday speech, metonymy is a figure of speech in some poetry and in much rhetoric. Greek and Latin scholars of rhetoric made significant contributions to the study of metonymy.

== Related concepts ==
Metaphor substitutes the name by an analogy, rather than by an association.

Synecdoche uses a part to refer to the whole, or the whole to refer to the part.

Metalepsis uses a familiar word or a phrase in a new context. For example, "lead foot" may describe a fast driver; lead is proverbially heavy, and a foot exerting more pressure on the accelerator causes a vehicle to go faster (in this context unduly so). The figure of speech is a "metonymy of a metonymy".

Many cases of polysemy originate as metonyms: for example, "chicken" means the meat as well as the animal; "crown" for the object, as well as the institution.

=== Versus metaphor ===
Metonymy works by the contiguity (association) between two concepts, whereas the term "metaphor" is based upon their analogous similarity. When people use metonymy, they do not typically wish to transfer qualities from one referent to another as they do with metaphor. There is nothing press-like about reporters or crown-like about a monarch, but "the press" and "the crown" are both common metonyms.

Some uses of figurative language may be understood as both metonymy and metaphor; for example, the relationship between "a crown" and a "king" could be interpreted metaphorically (i.e., the king, like his gold crown, could be seemingly stiff yet ultimately malleable, over-ornate, and consistently immobile). In the phrase "lands belonging to the crown", the word "crown" is a metonymy. The reason is that monarchs by and large indeed wear a crown, physically. In other words, there is a pre-existent link between "crown" and "monarchy". On the other hand, when Ghil'ad Zuckermann argues that the Israeli language is a "phoenicuckoo cross with some magpie characteristics", he is using metaphors. There is no physical link between a language and a bird. The reason the metaphors "phoenix" and "cuckoo" are used is that on the one hand hybridic "Israeli" is based on Hebrew, which, like a phoenix, rises from the ashes; and on the other hand, hybridic "Israeli" is based on Yiddish, which like a cuckoo, lays its egg in the nest of another bird, tricking it to believe that it is its own egg. Furthermore, the metaphor "magpie" is employed because, according to Zuckermann, hybridic "Israeli" displays the characteristics of a magpie, "stealing" from languages such as Arabic and English.

Two examples using the term "fishing" help clarify the distinction. The phrase "to fish pearls" uses metonymy, drawing from "fishing" the idea of taking things from the ocean. What is carried across from "fishing fish" to "fishing pearls" is the domain of metonymy. In contrast, the metaphorical phrase "fishing for information" transfers the concept of fishing into a new domain. If someone is "fishing" for information, we do not imagine that the person is anywhere near the ocean; rather, we transpose elements of the action of fishing (waiting, hoping to catch something that cannot be seen, probing, and most importantly, trying) into a new domain (a conversation). Thus, metaphors work by presenting a target set of meanings and using them to suggest a similarity between items, actions, or events in two domains, whereas metonymy calls up or references a specific domain (here, removing items from the sea).

Sometimes, metaphor and metonymy may both be at work in the same figure of speech, or one could interpret a phrase metaphorically or metonymically. For example, the phrase "lend me your ear" could be analyzed in a number of ways. One could imagine the following interpretations:

- Analyze "ear" metonymically first – "ear" means "attention". The phrase "Talk to him; you have his ear" also echoes this meaning. In both this phrase and "lending an ear", we stretch the base meaning of possession and lending (to let someone borrow an object) to include non-material things (attention), but, beyond this slight extension of the verb, no metaphor is at work. In this vein, Merriam Webster argues that "lend me your ear" is a metonym and not a synecdoche because what's being requested is the viewer's attention and the ear is only a part of the viewer's attention in a figurative way, but not literally.
- Imagine the whole phrase literally – imagine that the speaker literally borrows the listener's ear as a physical object (and the person's head with it). Then the speaker has temporary possession of the listener's ear, so the listener has granted the speaker temporary control over what the listener hears. The phrase "lend me your ear" is interpreted to metaphorically mean that the speaker wants the listener to grant the speaker temporary control over what the listener hears.
- First, analyze the verb phrase "lend me your ear" metaphorically to mean "turn your ear in my direction", since it is known that, literally lending a body part is nonsensical. Then, analyze the motion of ears metonymically – we associate "turning ears" with "paying attention", which is what the speaker wants the listeners to do.

It is difficult to say which analysis above most closely represents the way a listener interprets the expression, and it is possible that different listeners analyse the phrase in different ways, or even in different ways at different times. Regardless, all three analyses yield the same interpretation. Thus, metaphor and metonymy, though different in their mechanism, work together seamlessly.

== Examples ==
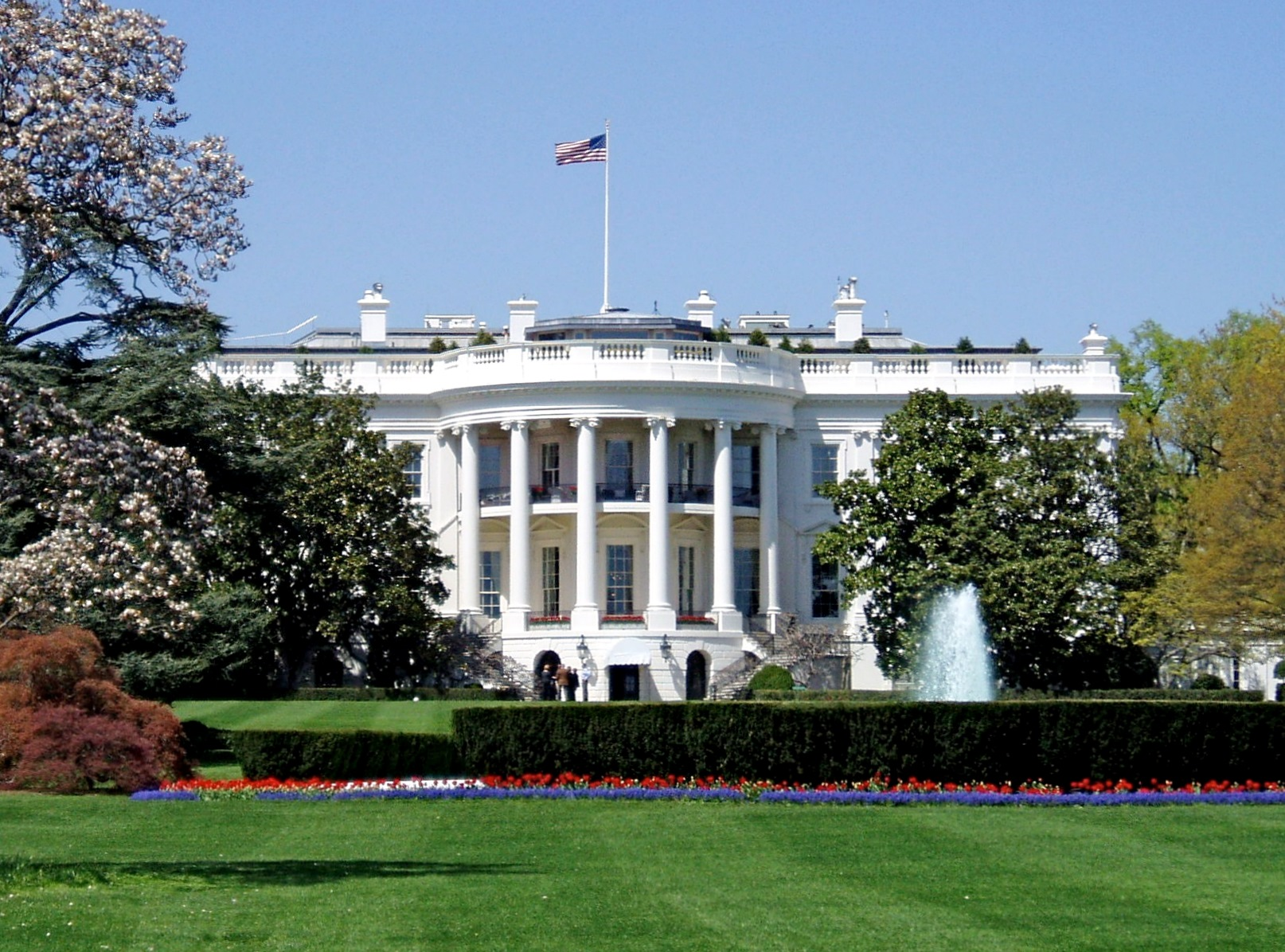
The White House is the official residence of the president of the United States, and its name is a common metonym for the presidency and cabinet of the United States.

Below are notable categories of metonymy uses:

Tools/instruments
Often a tool is used to signify the job it does or the person who does the job, as in the phrase "his Rolodex is long and valuable" (referring to the Rolodex instrument, which keeps contact business cards, meaning he has a lot of contacts and knows many people). Also "the press" (referring to the printing press), or as in the proverb, "The pen is mightier than the sword."

Product for process
The product of an activity stands for the activity itself. For example, in "The book is moving right along", the book refers to the process of writing or publishing.

Punctuation marks
Punctuation marks often stand metonymically for a meaning expressed by the mark. For example, "He's a big question mark to me" indicates that something is unknown. In the same way, in American English, "period" can be used to emphasize that a point is concluded or not to be challenged.

Synecdoche
A part of something is often used for the whole, as when people refer to "head" of cattle or assistants are referred to as "hands". An example of this is the Canadian dollar, referred to as the loonie for the image of a bird on the one-dollar coin. United States one hundred-dollar bills are often referred to as "Bens", "Benjamins" or "Franklins" because they bear a portrait of Benjamin Franklin. Also, the whole of something is used for a part, as when people refer to a municipal employee as "the city" or police officers as "the law".

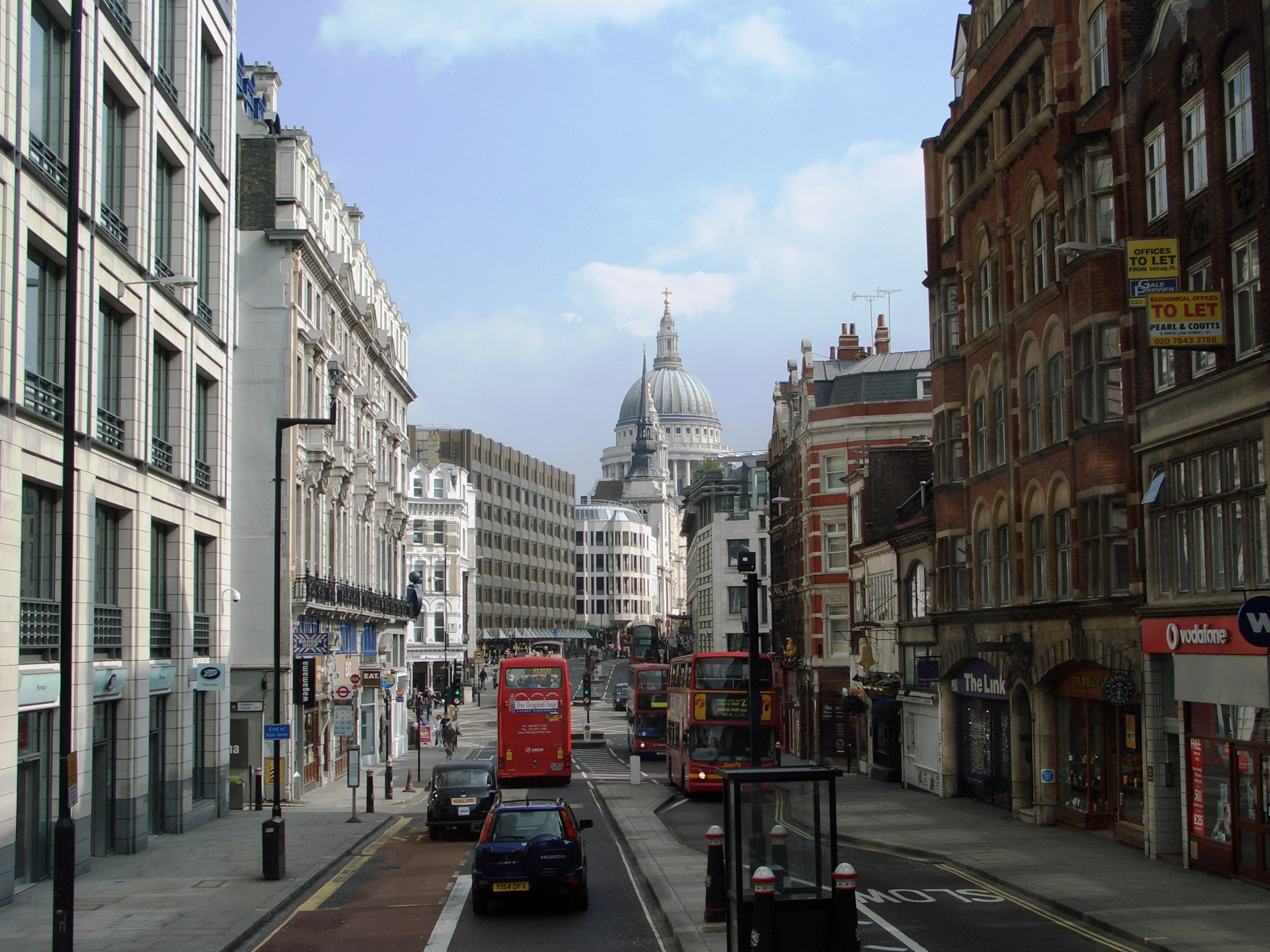
Fleet Street (where most British national newspapers previously operated) is a metonym for the British press

Item, place, or body part
A physical item, place, or body part used to refer to a related concept, such as "the bench" for the judicial profession, "stomach" or "belly" for appetite or hunger, "mouth" for speech, being "in diapers" for infancy, "palate" for taste, "the altar" or "the aisle" for marriage, "hand" for someone's responsibility for something ("he had a hand in it"), "head" or "brain" for mind or intelligence, or "nose" for concern about someone else's affairs, (as in "keep your nose out of my business"). A reference to Timbuktu, as in "from here to Timbuktu", usually means a place or idea is too far away or mysterious.

Containment
When one thing contains another, it can be used metonymically, as when "dish" is used to refer not to a plate but to the food it contains, when a "book" refers not to pages bound at the edge but to the work of literature it contains, or as when the name of a building is used to refer to the entity it contains, as when "the White House" or "the Pentagon" are used to refer to the administration of the United States, or the U.S. Department of Defense, respectively.

Toponyms
A country's capital city or some location within the city is frequently used as a metonym for the country's government, such as Washington, D.C., in the United States; Ottawa in Canada; Manila in Philippines; Tokyo in Japan; Seoul in South Korea; Beijing in China; Bangkok in Thailand; Rome in Italy; Paris in France; New Delhi in India; Westminster in the United Kingdom; and Moscow in Russia. Perhaps the oldest such example is "Pharaoh" which originally referred to the residence of the king of Egypt but by the New Kingdom had come to refer to the king himself. Similarly, other important places, such as Wall Street, K Street, Madison Avenue, Silicon Valley, Hollywood, Vegas, and Detroit are commonly used to refer to the industries that are located there (finance, lobbying, advertising, high technology, entertainment, vice industry, and motor vehicles, respectively). It also refers to the locations of the company headquarters, such as Kamuning, Ignacia, and Reliance for the three major media companies of the Philippines GMA Network Inc., ABS-CBN Corporation, and TV5 Network, respectively. Such usage may also extend to surrounding areas of these regions, such as film studios in Burbank or tech companies in the broader San Francisco Bay Area. Such usage may persist even when the industries in question have either moved elsewhere or have never been solely contained to one area, for example, individuals speaking of "Silicon Valley" may be thinking of Microsoft in Washington state, and Fleet Street continues to be used as a metonymy for the British national press, though many national publications are no longer headquartered on the street of that name.

Brand for product
Through genericization, trademarked brand names can come to refer to a given product itself, including other brands for the same goods. Examples include "Kleenex" for tissues, "Rolex" for expensive watches, "Hoover" for vacuum cleaners, "Mackintosh" for raincoats, "Elastoplast" or "Band-Aid" for adhesive bandages, and "Sellotape" for adhesive tape.

Inventor for invention

- "welly" for "Wellington boot"
- "Frankenstein" for Frankenstein's monster

=== Places and institutions ===
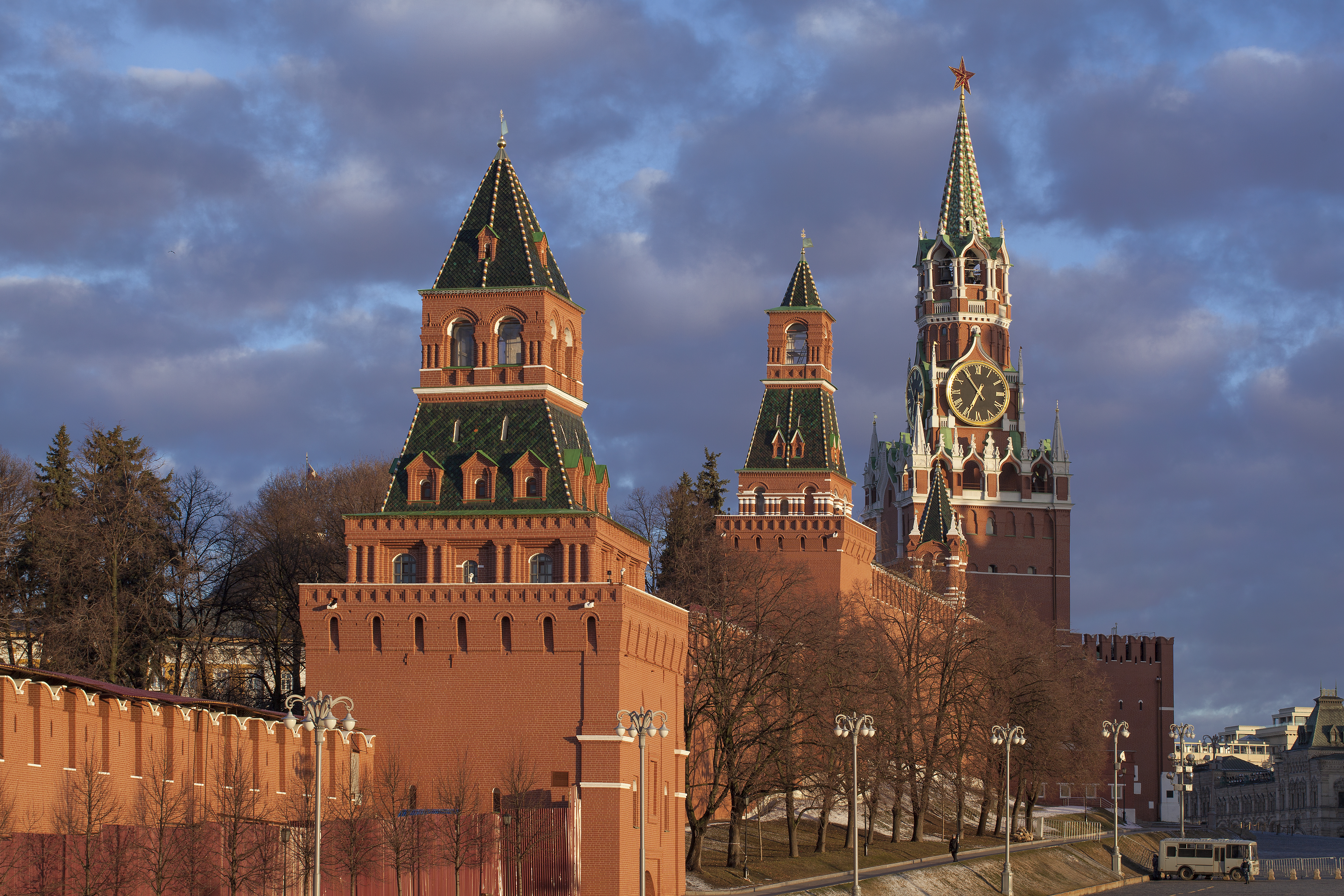
The Kremlin is often used as a metonym for the central governments of both the Soviet Union and modern Russia

The name of a place, capital city, institution, or notable government building is often used to refer to the authority themselves or headquartered there. Examples include:

- Beijing or Zhongnanhai for the central government of China;
- Brussels for the European Union;
- The church and state for the Catholic Church and all governments, respectively;
- The Crown for the Monarchy of the United Kingdom;
- Downing Street for the Government of the United Kingdom;
- The Hague for the International Court of Justice or International Criminal Court (and often international courts generally);
- The Kremlin for that of Russia (and historically, the Soviet Union);
- The Vatican for the Holy See;
- Westminster for the Parliament of the United Kingdom;
- The White House and Washington, D.C. for the United States' president, Executive Office, State Department, and Federal government of the United States, respectively;
- Wall Street for the New York Stock Exchange (NYSE) and its reports of NYSE-listed companies, and United States' financial sector and major banks in general;
- A notable historical example is the use of the Sublime Porte to refer to the central government (or more particularly, sometimes the foreign ministry) of the Ottoman Empire.
- Albany for the government of New York State (and similarly other U.S. state capitals, such as Sacramento or Austin, for their state governments);
- Queen's Park for the Government of Ontario and the Legislative Assembly of Ontario (with provincial capitals usually used for other provincial governments);
- Bercy for the French Ministry of the Economy and Finance;
- Capitol Hill (or the Hill) for the United States Congress;
- The Casa Rosada for the Argentine presidency;
- The Élysée for the French presidency;
- Foggy Bottom for the United States Department of State;
- Holyrood for the Scottish Parliament;
- Cardiff Bay for the Welsh Parliament;
- Kasumigaseki for the Japanese civil service;
- Langley for the Central Intelligence Agency;
- Matignon for the French prime minister and their office;
- Nagatachō for Japanese national politics and the National Diet;
- The Pentagon for the United States Department of Defense;
- Planalto for the Brazilian presidency;
- The Quai d'Orsay for the French Ministry for Europe and Foreign Affairs;
- Scotland Yard for the Metropolitan Police;
- Threadneedle Street for the Bank of England;
- Turtle Bay for the United Nations;
- Whitehall for the British civil service;

A place (or places) can represent an entire industry. For instance:

- K Street for Washington, D.C.'s lobbying industry or lobbying in the United States in general;
- Hollywood for the U.S. film industry, and the people associated with it;
- Broadway for the American commercial theatrical industry;
- Madison Avenue for the American advertising industry;
- Silicon Valley for the American technology industry;
- The High Street (of which there are over 5,000 in Britain) is a term commonly used to refer to the entire British retail sector.
- The City or the Square Mile for the British financial services industry;
- Bay Street for the Canadian financial sector;
- Dalal Street for the Bombay Stock Exchange and the Indian stock market generally;
- Faria Lima for the Brazilian finance and asset management industry;
- Fleet Street for the British national press;
- Detroit for the American automotive industry;
- Harley Street for private medicine in London;
- Savile Row for bespoke tailoring;
- Davos for the World Economic Forum and, by extension, the global business and political elite who attend it (see Davos Man);

Common nouns and phrases can also be metonyms: "red tape" can stand for bureaucracy whether or not that bureaucracy uses actual red tape to bind documents. In Commonwealth realms, the Crown is a legal metonym for the state in all its aspects.

== Art ==
Metonyms can also be wordless. For example, Roman Jakobson argued that cubist art relied heavily on nonlinguistic metonyms, while surrealist art relied more on metaphors.

Lakoff and Turner argued that all words are metonyms: "Words stand for the concepts they express". Some artists have used actual words as metonyms in their paintings. For example, Miró's 1925 painting "Photo: This is the Color of My Dreams" has the word "photo" to represent the image of his dreams. This painting comes from a series of paintings called peintures-poésies (paintings-poems) which reflect Miró's interest in dreams and the subconscious and the relationship of words, images, and thoughts. Picasso, in his 1911 painting "Pipe Rack and Still Life on Table" inserts the word "Ocean" rather than painting an ocean: These paintings by Miró and Picasso are, in a sense, the reverse of a rebus: the word stands for the picture, instead of the picture standing for the word.

== See also ==
- -onym
- Eggcorn
- Eponym
- Enthymeme
- Kenning
- Meronymy and holonymy
- Newspeak
- Pars pro toto
- Simile
- Slang
- Sobriquet
- Stereotype

=== Kinds of metonymy ===
- Antonomasia
- Deferred reference
- Euphemism by comparison
- Generic trademark
- Synecdoche
- Totum pro parte
