= Deferred reference =

Type of metonymy

In natural language, a deferred reference is the metonymic use of an expression to refer to an entity related to the conventional meaning of that expression, but not denoted by it. Several types of deferred reference have been studied in the literature.

== Examples ==
=== English ===
The following examples are from (Nunberg 1995):

- (server to a co-worker in a deli) The ham sandwich is at table 7.
- (restaurant patron to a valet, indicating a key) This is parked out back.
- Yeats is still widely read.
