= Middelburg Bastion =

Historical structure in Malacca, Malaysia

Coordinates: 2°11′38.8″N 102°14′53.3″E

- Malay: Kubu Middelburg
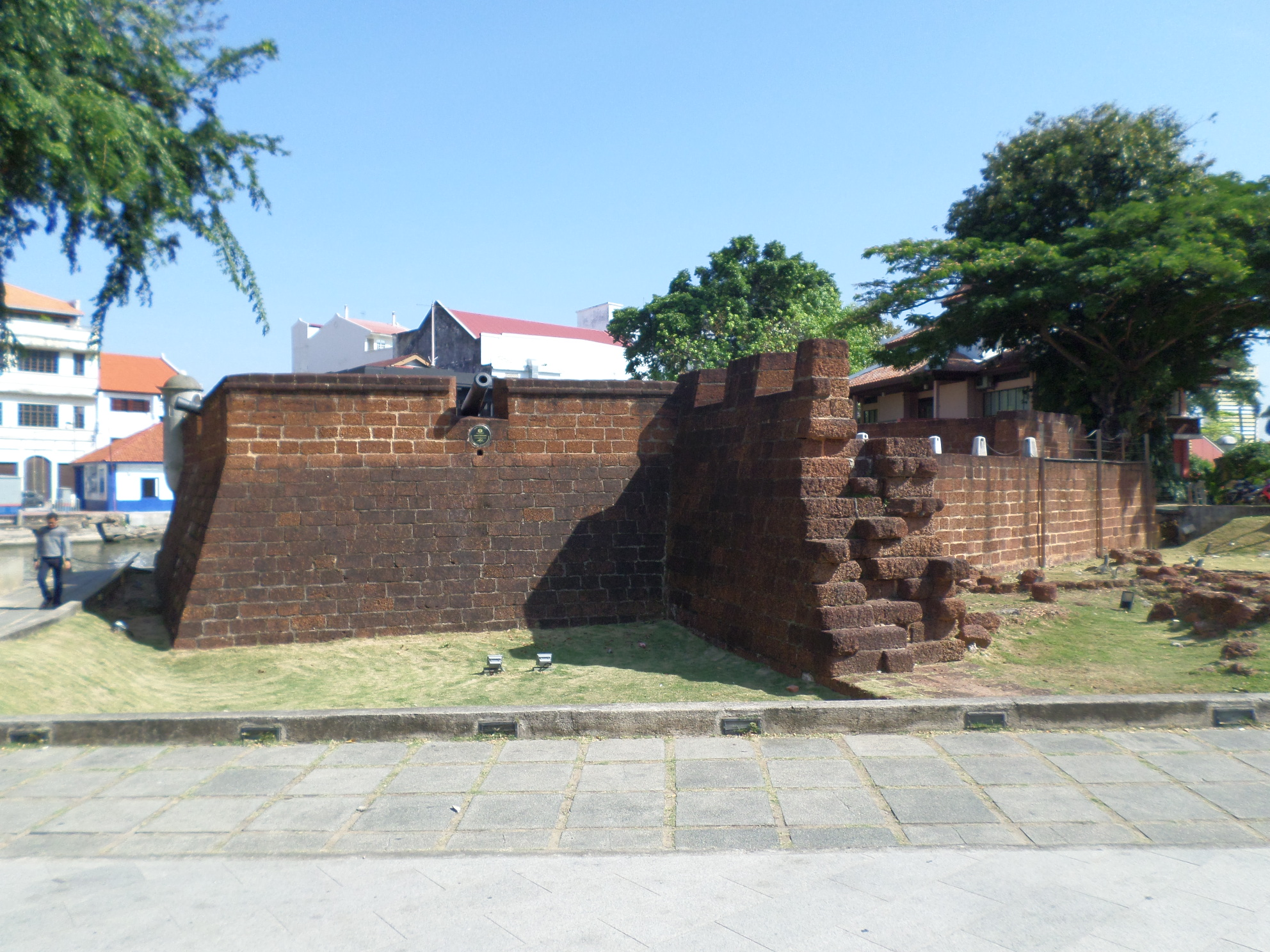
- Interactive map of the Middelburg Bastion area

General information
- Type: bastion
- Location: Malacca City, Malacca, Malaysia
- Completed: 1660

Technical details
- Floor area: 0.09 hectares

The Middelburg Bastion (Dutch: Bastion Middelburgh) was one of nine bastions of A Famosa, in Malacca City, Malacca, Malaysia located at the mouth of Malacca River. The bastion has been restored, together with cannons, and is open for visitors. The Dutch name is in reference to the city of Middelburg, Zeeland.

== History ==
After the fall of Portuguese Malacca to the Dutch in 1641, the Dutch carried out new measures to ensure the defence and security of Malacca due to the ongoing threats they received from outside and inside. They fortified the wall of Malacca City to further strengthen the existing city defence left by the Portuguese. The fortification measures involved the construction of a bastion strategically located at the mouth of Malacca River. The construction of the Middelburg Bastion was carried out in 1660.

== See also ==
- List of tourist attractions in Malacca
