= Pars pro toto =

Latin for a part (taken) for the whole

Pars pro toto (Latin for 'a part (taken) for the whole'; /ˌpɑːrz proʊ ˈtoʊtoʊ/; Latin: [ˈpars proː ˈtoːtoː]) is a figure of speech where the name of a portion of an object, place, or concept is used or taken to represent its entirety. It is distinct from a merism, which is a reference to a whole by an enumeration of parts; and metonymy, where an object, place, or concept is called by something or some place associated with it. It is a form of synecdoche, which can refer both to pars pro toto and its inverse, totum pro parte (Latin for 'the whole for a part').

In the context of language, pars pro toto means that something is named after a part or subset of it or after a limited characteristic, which in itself is not necessarily representative of the whole. For example, "glasses" is a pars pro toto name for something that consists of more than just two pieces of glass (the frame, nose bridge, temples, etc. as well as the lenses). Pars pro toto usage is especially common in political geography, with examples including "Holland" for the Netherlands; and, particularly in languages other than English, using the translation of "England" in that language to refer to Great Britain or the United Kingdom.

== Geography ==
An example of a pars pro toto in geography is the use of the capital to refer generally to the country such as Washington for the United States, Beijing for China, or Moscow for Russia. When the capital is used to refer specifically to the country's government, the figure of speech is a metonymy rather than a pars pro toto.

Certain place names are sometimes used as synecdoches to denote an area greater than that warranted by their strict meaning:

- "Antigua" for Antigua and Barbuda.
- "Aotearoa" for New Zealand.
- "Austria" for the former Austro-Hungarian Empire or the Habsburg-ruled lands.
- "The Balkans" to include historically related parts of southeastern Europe as well as the Balkan Peninsula, or for the countries that made up the former Yugoslavia.
- "Bohemia" for the former Czech lands, now the Czech Republic.
- "Bosnia" for Bosnia and Herzegovina.
- "Daman" (or "Daman and Diu") for Dadra and Nagar Haveli and Daman and Diu.
- "Denmark" for the erstwhile Kingdom of Denmark–Norway.
- "Great Britain" for the United Kingdom.
- "Holland" for the Netherlands – see Netherlands (terminology).
- "Laurentia" for Canada.
- "Malta" for the island, the state/republic, and the whole archipelago, including Gozo and Comino.
- "Mexico" for the Viceroyalty of New Spain, the State of Mexico and Mexico.
- "Micronesia" for the country/republic (the Federated States) and the whole subregion, including Nauru, the Marshall Islands, Palau, the Northern Mariana Islands and Guam.
- "Muscovy" for Russia.
- "Monte Carlo" for Monaco.
- "Naples" for the former Kingdom of the Two Sicilies.
- "Newfoundland" for what is now called Newfoundland and Labrador.
- "Patagonia" for the entirety of the Southern Cone.
- "Peru" for the former Inca Empire and the Viceroyalty or Kingdom of Peru.
- "Piedmont" or "Sardinia" for the former Kingdom of Sardinia.
- "Poland" for the former Polish–Lithuanian Commonwealth.
- "Prussia" for the former German Empire.
- "Russia" (or "Soviet Russia") for the former Soviet Union.
- "Saint Helena" for Saint Helena, Ascension, and Tristan da Cunha.
- "Saint Kitts" for Saint Kitts and Nevis.
- "Saint Vincent" for Saint Vincent and the Grenadines.
- "São Tomé" for São Tomé and Príncipe.
- "Scandinavia" for the Nordic countries or Fennoscandia.
- "Serbia" (or "Yugoslav Serbia") for the former Yugoslavia or Serbia and Montenegro.
- "Solomon Islands" for the state/Commonwealth realm, and the whole archipelago, including Bougainville Island.
- "South America" for the partially overlapping concept of Latin America.
- "South Pole" for Antarctica.
- "Sweden" for the former Sweden-Norway.
- "Tahiti" for French Polynesia.
- "Taiwan" for the (Free area of the) Republic of China, which consists of Penghu, Kinmen, Matsu, and the island of Taiwan.
- "Tel Aviv" for Tel Aviv - Yafo.
- "Trinidad" for Trinidad and Tobago.
- "Turkey" for the former Ottoman Empire.
- Jawadwipa (Java), Swarnadwipa (Sumatra), and Sunda Islands (Java, Sumatra, Kalimantan, Bali, East & West Nusa Tenggara), for Indonesia (all of those and Papua & Maluku Islands).
  - Java, for the main island and the surrounding islands (Madura, Thousand Islands, and hundred others) under the jurisdiction of the 6 provinces in Indonesia.
  - Sumatra, for the main island and the surrounding islands (Nias, Bangka, Belitung, etc.).
  - Kalimantan, Sulawesi, Papua, for the main islands and the surrounding islands.
- "Westminster" for the City of Westminster, which includes Marylebone, Mayfair, Paddington, Pimlico, St. James's and Soho, as well as Westminster itself.

=== Demonyms and ethnic groups ===
- "Acheans", "Argives" and "Danaans" for the Greeks united in a league against Troy in Homer's Illiad.
- "Alemanni" for all Germanic peoples (used first by the Romans and later by the speakers of Romance languages).
- "Franks" for all Western Europeans (used in the Muslim world throughout the medieval and early modern periods).
- "Yankee" for all Americans (despite the original meaning of the word being of an inhabitant of New England).

== Other examples ==
Other examples include an individual object being used to refer to a larger object or group of which it is a part:

- "Big Ben" for Elizabeth Tower.
- "bread" for food in general, as in "my job puts bread in my children's mouths".
- "gun" when used to refer to the shooter as well as his firearm (e.g., "he was a hired gun").
- "motor" for automobile (as in the corporation General Motors or the word "Motors" used in the name of a car dealership).
- "pork bellies" for commodities to be traded.
- "wheels" for car, "jet" for jet(-propelled) airplane, "sail" for sailing ship, "steam" for steam locomotive.

== See also ==
- Geographical renaming
- Metonymy
- Synecdoche
- Totum pro parte
