= Totum pro parte =

Latin phrase meaning "the whole for a part"; form of metonymy

Totum pro parte is Latin for "the whole for a part"; it refers to a kind of metonymy. The plural is tota pro partibus, "wholes for parts". In context of language, it means something is named after something of which it is only a part (or only a limited characteristic, not necessarily representative of the whole). For example, "Russia" or "Russians", referring to the political institution (both historically and contemporary) or its people (as in “the Russians signed the treaty” or “Russia signed the treaty” where “the Russians” and “Russia” refer to the government officials who signed it). A pars pro toto (in which a part is used to describe the whole) is the opposite of a totum pro parte.

== In geography ==
Some place names of large areas are commonly used to refer synonymously to a smaller part of the larger area than is strictly deemed correct. Examples of this include:

- "America" for the United States (see use of the word American).
- "Asia" for East and Southeast Asia (conversely, Asia is a pars pro toto, originally referring only to Asia Minor).
- "China" for the People's Republic of China since the 1970s, and prior to that, the Republic of China.
- "The Congo" for the Republic of the Congo or the Democratic Republic of the Congo.
- "Europe" for the European Union or for Continental Europe excluding the British Isles.
- "Germany" was often used for West Germany during the Cold War.
- "Ireland" for the Republic of Ireland excluding Northern Ireland.
- "Korea" for South Korea, excluding North Korea.
- "Macedonia" for the Republic of North Macedonia (see Macedonia naming dispute).
- "Micronesia" for the Federated States of Micronesia.
- Nanyang, Maritime Southeast Asia, Malay Archipelago, Sunda Islands for Indonesia.
- "Northumbria" for North East England or historic Northumberland and County Durham.
- ”Palestine” for the Gaza Strip.
- "Ulster" for Northern Ireland.
- "Western Hemisphere" for the Americas.
- "Yemen" was often used for North Yemen.

=== Governments ===
The capital city of a country is often used to refer to the national government of the country.

- "Brussels" to refer to principal institutions of the European Union.
- "Kyiv" to refer to the Ukrainian government.
- "London" to refer to the British government.
- "Moscow" to refer to the Russian government, or from 1922 to 1991, the Soviet government.
- "Washington", or "DC" are often used to refer to the United States government.

=== International bodies ===
Similar to capital cities, the name of a city can be used to refer to the headquarters of intergovernmental organizations. Notable examples include:

- "New York" to refer to the headquarters of the United Nations, or the United Nations more generally.
- "The Hague" can refer to any of the international courts currently or formerly headquartered in The Hague. Most commonly it refers to the International Court of Justice or the International Criminal Court, which are often confused. Being "brought to the Hague" can refer to prosecution for war crimes more generally, often at the ICC.

== Other examples ==
The verb "to drink" is often used in this manner. Depending on context it can stand for the generic, standard definition "to consume a liquid" (e.g. "I'm thirsty, is there anything to drink?") or for the narrow, limited definition "to imbibe alcoholic beverages" (e.g. "He goes out to drink too often"). Also, fluid can be used for liquid, as in brake fluid or bodily fluid. (The presence of air, a fluid, is not wanted when there is low fluid.)

- "Art" specifically referring to visual art.
- "Fiddle" referring to a modern violin, just one of a broader category of instruments called "fiddles."
- "Internet" for the "World Wide Web (WWW)"; the Internet is a network of computer networks, whereas the WWW is a network of hypertext documents that one accesses via the Internet.
- "New wave music" referring to a style of synth-pop influenced by early new wave.
- "PC" to mean a computer running Microsoft Windows.
- "Processed food" specifically referring to ultra-processed food, not older techniques such as salt preservation
- "Puzzle" referring specifically to a jigsaw puzzle.
- "Ranked-choice voting" as a misnomer for "Instant-runoff voting".
- "Summer" to mean only summer vacation.
- "Technology" referring to electronic devices or specifically digital electronics.
- "The People of the State of California" to mean only the elected state legislators.

=== Athletic teams ===
Sports teams are often referred to simply by their geographic or institutional identity:

- "Go Navy! Beat Army!" (a cheer for the team representing the United States Naval Academy in a contest against the team representing the United States Military Academy).
- "Houston will be in New York this weekend".
- "Russia thrashed the Czech Republic" (the Russia national football team defeated the Czech Republic national football team).

== See also ==
- Hyperbole
- Metonymy
- Pars pro toto
- Synecdoche
