= Goliath (disambiguation) =

Goliath was a giant famous for his battle with David as described in the Hebrew Bible.

Goliath may also refer to:

== People with the name ==
- Great Goliath, ring name of Mexican professional wrestler Pablo Ordaz Crispín (1934–2004)
- Matumona Lundala (born 1972), an Angolan football player nicknamed "Goliath"
- Matt Parkinson (comedian), one of the Chasers on The Chase Australia nicknamed "Goliath"
- Goliath Tabuni, leader of the West Papua National Liberation Army

== Arts, entertainment, and media ==
=== Fictional characters ===
- Goliath (Amalgam Comics), a fictional Amalgam Comics superhero
- Goliath (Centuria), member of the Accursed Battalion in the Japanese web manga Centuria
- Goliath (comics), any of a number of characters
- Goliath (Dungeons & Dragons), a race related to the giants in the Dungeons & Dragons fantasy role-playing game
- Goliath (fictional dog), a character in the stop-motion cartoon series Davey and Goliath
- Goliath (Gargoyles), a character in the animated television series Gargoyles (TV series)
- Goliath, a fictional lion from the animated children television series JoJo's Circus
- Goliath (Devil May Cry), a demon in the video game Devil May Cry 5

=== Literature ===
- Goliath (Alten novel), by Steve Alten, 2002
- Goliath (graphic novel), a short fictional book by Tom Gauld
- Goliath (Westerfeld novel), by Scott Westerfeld, 2011
- Goliath (Onyebuchi novel), science fiction novel by Tochi Onyebuchi
- Goliath, a 15th-century fechtbuch (combat manual) by an anonymous author
- Goliath: Life and Loathing in Greater Israel, a 2013 nonfiction book by Max Blumenthal

=== Films ===
- Goliath, a 2008 film directed by David Zellner
- Goliath (film), a 2019 film directed by Luke Villemaire
- Goliath II, a 1960 short animated comedy film by Disney, about a tiny elephant

=== Music ===
- Goliath (Butcher Babies album), 2013
- Goliath (Exodus album), 2026
- Goliath (Kellermensch album), 2017
- Goliath (Steve Taylor album), 2014, or the title song
- "Goliath", a song by Karnivool from their 2009 album Sound Awake
- "Goliath", a song by the Mars Volta from their 2008 album The Bedlam in Goliath
- "Goliath", a song by Melanie Doane from her 1998 album Adam's Rib
- "Goliath", a song by The Silent League
- Goliath Artists, a talent firm that manages musicians

=== Television ===
- Goliath (TV series), a 2016 television series produced by Amazon Studios

==== Episodes ====
- "Goliath", Daniel Boone (1964) season 3, episode 3 (1966)
- "Goliath", Digimon Tamers episode 29 (2001)
- "Goliath", Kings (American) episodes 1–2 (2005)
- "Goliath", Knight Rider (1982) season 2, episodes 1–2 (1983)
- "Goliath", Lassie (1954) season 13, episode 29 (1967)
- "Goliath", Law & Order: Special Victims Unit season 6, episode 23 (2005)
- "Goliath", Revelation episode 3 (2020)
- "Goliath", The Bridge (2013) season 2, episode 8 (2014)

=== Other uses ===
- Goliath (website), a business directory owned by Thomson Gale publishers

== Biology ==
- Goliath, a cultivar of Magnolia grandiflora
- Atlantic goliath grouper, a species of fish found in the Atlantic Ocean
- Eurycnema goliath, a species of stick insect found in Australia
- Goliath birdeater, largest spider in the world native to the rain forest regions of northern South America
- Goliath coucal, a cuckoo endemic to Indonesia
- Goliath frog, an African frog of genus Conraua
- Goliath heron, a very large wading bird found in sub-Saharan Africa, with smaller numbers in Southwest and South Asia
- Goliath imperial pigeon, a bird endemic to New Caledonia
- Goliath shrew, a mammal
- Goliathus or Goliath beetle, a genus of large insects
- Pacific goliath grouper, a species of fish found in the Pacific Ocean
- Goliath tiger fish

== Roller coasters ==
- Goliath (La Ronde), a hypercoaster in Montreal, Québec, Canada
- Goliath (Six Flags Great America), a wooden roller coaster in Gurnee, Illinois
- Goliath (Six Flags Magic Mountain), a hypercoaster located in California, United States
- Goliath (Six Flags New England), a now-closed inverted boomerang roller coaster that was located near Springfield, Massachusetts, United States
- Goliath (Six Flags Over Georgia), a hypercoaster located in Georgia, United States
- Goliath (Walibi Holland), a roller coaster in Biddinghuizen, Netherlands
- Chupacabra, an inverted roller coaster at Six Flags Fiesta Texas formerly named Goliath.
- Magic Flyer, a roller coaster at Six Flags Magic Mountain formerly named Goliath Jr.

== Technology and transport ==
- Goliath (company), a German car brand of the Borgward group
- Goliath (locomotive), one of the four South Devon Railway Tornado class steam locomotives
- Goliath (Mangalia), a crane in Mangalia, Romania
- Goliath (Rosyth), a crane in Rosyth Dockyard, Scotland
- Goliath, one of Erickson Air-Crane's Sikorsky S-64 Skycrane heavy-lift helicopters
- Farman F.60 Goliath, the first long-distance passenger airliner
- Goliath tracked mine, a remote-controlled tracked explosive device used by the German Army during World War II
- Goliath transmitter, a VLF-transmitter of the German Navy in World War II
- HMS Goliath, the name of several British Royal Navy ships
- LVT(U)X2 Goliath, late 1950s US Navy amphibious tracked utility landing craft, manufactured by Pacific Car and Foundry
- Samson and Goliath (cranes), twin shipbuilding gantry cranes in Queen's Island, Belfast, Northern Ireland
- USS Goliath, a U.S. monitor also called USS Catskill (1862)

== Other uses ==
- Goliath (betting), a type of bet covering eight selections
- Goliath, a traditionally craft-brewed ale produced by the UK Wychwood Brewery
- Goliath Books, a publisher of art and photography books
- Goliath Ventures, a cryptocurrency investment firm alleged to have been a Ponzi scheme
- Goliath language, a Papuan language of West Papua
- Goliath, a class of civilization proposed in Goliath's Curse by Luke Kemp

== See also ==
- David and Goliath (disambiguation)
