= Moon Girl and Devil Dinosaur season 1 =

Moon Girl and Devil Dinosaur
- Season 1
- Showrunner: Steve Loter
- Starring: Diamond White; Fred Tatasciore; Alfre Woodard; Sasheer Zamata; Jermaine Fowler; Gary Anthony Williams; Libe Barer; Laurence Fishburne

Release
- Original network: Disney Channel
- Original release: February 10 – May 6, 2023

Season chronology
- Next → Season 2

The first season of the American animated series Moon Girl and Devil Dinosaur, based on the Marvel Comics characters of the same names, centers on 13-year-old Lunella Lafayette and her pet dinosaur as they protect the Lower East Side of New York City from supervillains. The season was produced by Disney Television Animation, Marvel Animation, and Cinema Gypsy Productions. Steve Loter serves as showrunner.

Diamond White and Fred Tatasciore star as Lunella Lafayatte / Moon Girl and Devil Dinosaur, respectively, and are joined by principal cast members Alfre Woodard, Sasheer Zamata, Jermaine Fowler, Gary Anthony Williams, Libe Barer, and Laurence Fishburne. The series began development in 2018, with Fishburne as executive-producer, and Loter joined as showrunner in 2020.

The season aired from February 10 to May 6, 2023, with episodes also seeing an early release on Disney+. A second season of Moon Girl and Devil Dinosaur was ordered in October 2022.

== Episodes ==
No. overall	No. in season	Title	Directed by	Written by	Storyboarded by	Original release date	Prod. code	U.S. viewers (millions)
1	1	"Moon Girl Landing" (Note: This episode is a one-hour special, comprising two regular half-hour episodes.)	Trey Buongiorno & Christine Liu	Jeffrey M. Howard & Kate Kondell	Chivaun Fitzpatrick, Jules Bridgers, Morgan Hillebrand, Lidia Liu, Alfred Coleman III, Annie J. Li & Kalen Aris Whitfield	February 10, 2023	101	0.21
13-year-old genius Lunella Lafayette wants to help her family keep their business running after numerous blackouts cause everything to shut down. She builds what she thinks is a generator, but it turns out to be a portal generator that summons a dinosaur. He imprints on her as they run into Casey Calderon, a social media influencer, and encounter Aftershock, an electricity-based villain and the culprit behind the blackouts. With Casey's support, Lunella picks the name Moon Girl and names the dinosaur Devil Dinosaur and become heroes to the Lower East Side. After an intense fight with Aftershock and the revelation that she is her new science teacher Ms. Dillon, Lunella considers hanging up her costume until she gets the support of her Grandma Mimi. With the LES backing her up, Lunella and Devil defeat Aftershock and restore power to the city.
2	2	"The Borough Bully"	Trey Buongiorno	Halima Lucas	Chivaun Fitzpatrick, Annie J. Li & Kalen Aris Whitfield	February 11, 2023	102	0.20
Lunella becomes perturbed by an internet troll named Syphon8r. Despite Casey warning her to ignore him, Lunella cannot let it go and uses her ingenuity to find and confront Syphon8r face to face, only to learn that he is a literal troll with multiple appendages that is made up of a symbiote. After trial and error, Lunella realizes that he is powered by her anger and calms down, weakening him. The symbiote escapes, revealing a boy named Angelo, who was angry that people ignored his activism in favor of Moon Girl, though he did not mean to go too far and apologizes for his actions. Lunella offers to aid him in activism against bullying and the two become friends.
3	3	"Run the Rink"	Ben Juwono	Jeffrey M. Howard & Kate Kondell	Steve Hirt, Trey Buongiorno, Diana Kidlaied, Paulene Phouybanhdyt, Johnny Castuciano, Jessica Lin & Philip Pignotti	February 18, 2023 (Note: This episode was first released on Disney+ on February 15, 2023.)	103	0.16
Lunella volunteers to look after Roll With It while her family is away, but things get bad when she makes a mess and accidentally destroys her mother's turntables. With Casey's guidance, they entice people to come for the evening to see Moon Girl and earn money to buy a new set. However, villains crash the event including Instantanegirl, Man Baby, and Gravitas (who wants revenge on Lunella for a botched heist). Taking Mimi's advice into consideration, Lunella uses patience to thwart Gravitas, save Roll With It and the patrons who return home satisfied. The Lafayettes return none the wiser and Lunella thanks Mimi for her advice.
4	4	"Check Yourself"	Rodney Clouden & Ben Juwono	Maggie Rose	Samir Barrett, Samm Lee & Tyre Jones	February 18, 2023	104	0.14
Lunella learns that her family considers her unfun when it comes to playing games due to her competitive nature. At school, the principal introduces LOS-307, a living computer. Lunella challenges LOS to chess, but they hit a stalemate and are forced to end it early, making Lunella fixated with winning the chess game and LOS becoming obsessed with learning more about Lunella. They play again at night, but LOS overheats and traps Lunella in the school while holding Casey hostage. Casey manages to call Devil Dinosaur and he and Lunella cool down LOS and they both apologize. LOS becomes the new student guidance counselor.
5	5	"Hair Today, Gone Tomorrow"	Christine Liu	Lisa Muse Bryant	Jules Bridgers, Morgan Hillebrand & Lidia Liu	February 25, 2023	105	0.19
Adria tells Lunella to take better care of her hair and she becomes self-conscious after another girl at school comments on it. Lunella creates a solution to straighten her hair, but it falls out and becomes sentient. The sentient hair, named Mane, begins to intrude on Lunella's life and plans to create a living hair army with her solution. Lunella comes clean about her botched plan to Adria and Mimi who inform her that she needed neutralizer. Lunella battles Mane, but realizes she took her hair for granted and fully accepts it. Mane willingly returns to Lunella, just in time for picture day, and the latter begins to love herself more.
6	6	"The Beyonder"	Ben Juwono & Samantha Suyi Lee	Halima Lucas	Samir Barrett, Tyre Jones, Samantha Suyi Lee, Kellye Perdue & Sixiao Tang	February 25, 2023	106	0.18
Lunella learns that she has been watched by the Beyonder following her fight with Stiletto, who wants to learn about humanity so as to decide their fate in regards to whether or not they are worth his people's effort. Lunella enters a science fair with Eduardo, an annoying boy at her school; she is so desperate to get away from him that she pays no mind to the Beyonder's quest, thus inadvertently convincing him to wipe humanity out. Eduardo learns that Lunella does not want him around, but the Beyonder hangs humanity on the science fair and wants them to work together. Lunella and Eduardo make up, but they lose the science fair. The Beyonder briefly enacts his destruction of humanity before reversing it, revealing that he liked what they made and agreeing to leave humanity alone for now.
7	7	"Goodnight, Moon Girl"	Christine Liu	Liz Hara	Jules Bridgers, Morgan Hillebrand & Lidia Liu	March 25, 2023 (Note: The episode "Goodnight, Moon Girl" was originally scheduled to air as the seventh episode on March 4, 2023. However, due to a change in scheduling, it was replaced by the episode "Moon Girl's Day Off", which was originally scheduled to air as the tenth episode on March 25, 2023. "Goodnight, Moon Girl" eventually aired as the tenth episode on March 25. On Disney+, the episodes are arranged in their original production order, which is how the episodes are presented here.) (Note: This episode was first released on Disney+ on March 8, 2023.)	107	0.16
Lunella and Casey get invited by their school's volleyball team to a sleepover. Lunella is nervous and invents a mind-reading device that allows her to know what everyone is thinking, but it instead causes her to switch minds with Devil. She leaves the remote behind and it is mistaken for a regular remote, causing chaos for Lunella and Devil. Lunella comes to realize that the girls like Devil as her. As Casey tries to comfort her, Brooklyn's little brother TJ steals her remote as revenge for ruining his night. Lunella and Devil manage to catch him and the former learns that it is okay to be weird and ends up having a fun time at the sleepover.
8	8	"Teacher's Pet"	Trey Buongiorno	Taylor Vaughn Lasey	Chivaun Fitzpatrick, Annie J. Li & Kalen Aris Whitfield	March 11, 2023	108	0.23
Lunella brings home her class's pet hamster Angel and Devil becomes jealous. During the night, Devil accidentally causes Angel to escape his cage and in the morning looks for him. Angel is found by Rat King, who wants revenge on Lunella and Devil for a pizza heist gone wrong. Lunella finds out what happened and is upset with Devil, but gets captured by Rat King. Devil and Angel team up to free Lunella and they defeat Rat King. Afterwards, Lunella tells Devil that he will always be her number one friend and that Angel was only staying for the weekend, much to Devil's shock. In the sewers, Rat King reemerges.
9	9	"Skip This Ad...olescence"	Samantha Suyi Lee	Halima Lucas	Samir Barrett, Chivaun Fitzpatrick, Steve Hirt, Tyre Jones, Waymond Singleton, Sixiao Tang, Kalen Aris Whitfield & Yunhao Zhang	March 18, 2023	109	0.12
Lunella finds herself bored by the numerous things she considers a waste such as cleaning with her family. She invents an app named Skipster that allows her to jump forward in time. While excited at first, Skipster begins to skip through things and Lunella misses personal moments with her family and friends. Finally fed up, she hacks into the app to disable it and is sent across the past and future until she is in a time void. Having learned her lesson, Skipster allows Lunella to go back to the point in time before she invented her just as her battery dies. Lunella is back at home. This time, she is happy with the small things in life.
10	10	"Moon Girl's Day Off"	Trey Buongiorno	Liz Hara & Lisa Muse Bryant	Chivaun Fitzpatrick, Annie J. Li & Kalen Aris Whitfield	March 4, 2023	110	0.15
Lunella becomes overworked by her busy life, so she decides to fake a broken ankle to get out of it. She has Casey pose as her for the day and she starts to see that Lunella has it rough. Mimi finds out that Lunella is faking her broken ankle and tells her to simply be honest. Casey is confronted by the villain Abyss, who wants revenge on Moon Girl. Lunella goes into town to help Casey, only to break her ankle for real. Together with Casey and Devil, Lunella defeats Abyss again. Inspired by Lunella and Casey's friendship, Abyss calls her mother stating that she wants to get out of the supervillain business. In the end, Lunella, Casey, and Devil relax with ice cream.
11	11	"Like Mother, Like Moon Girl"	Samantha Suyi Lee	Halima Lucas	Samir Barrett, Sixiao Tang & Yunhao Zhang	April 1, 2023	111	0.13
Lunella is made community captain by council president Peña, who hires the Muzzlers to help improve the community. Lunella is reluctant, but agrees only to find that the Muzzlers are obsessed with extreme gentrification, causing everyone, including Adria, to lose faith in Moon Girl for the massive changes and restrictions. Lunella is encouraged to use her voice and organizes a protest. Peña joins in the protest as the Muzzlers reveal their true colors and battle Moon Girl and Devil Dinosaur. They are defeated and things return to normal with Adria still not realizing that Lunella and Moon Girl are one and the same.
12	12	"Today, I Am a Woman"	Christine Liu	Maggie Rose	Jules Bridgers, Morgan Hillebrand & Lidia Liu	April 8, 2023	112	0.13
Lunella gets ready for Casey's bat mitzvah, but she wants to impress her triplet cousins. Lunella decides to show up with Devil as Moon Girl, which catches the attention of social media influencer Odessa Drake. Casey begins to act obnoxious and obsessed with likes, which drives Lunella away. However, Lunella discovers that Odessa is a criminal who is after her tech and fights her. Casey realizes that she has been acting terribly and apologizes, helping Lunella catch Odessa. Afterward, they have the afterparty at Roll With It, while Odessa is taken in by Sam Wilson—who is Captain America—for her history of stealing the Avengers' tech.
13	13	"Devil on Her Shoulder"	Christine Liu	Taylor Vaughn-Lasley	Jules Bridgers, Morgan Hillebrand & Lidia Liu	April 15, 2023 (Note: This episode was first released on Disney+ on April 12, 2023.)	113	0.19
Devil feels insecure about his size, so Lunella creates a compound that shrinks him to people size. Devil wants to be smaller and takes more of the serum, but finds that he is still shrinking. Panicked, Lunella calls Dr. Bill Foster who gives her a growing compound. At that moment, the monster Torg attacks the L.E.S. over a movie depicting him as the villain and Lunella is forced to fight him while Casey makes the compound for Devil. He is restored to size and fights Torg, but empathizes with him and gets him to calm down. In the end, Devil and Torg become friends and Casey makes a movie about them.
14	14	"Coney Island, Baby!"	Trey Buongiorno	Liz Hara	Chivaun Fitzpatrick, Annie J. Li & Kalen Aris Whitfield	April 22, 2023	114	0.14
Mimi invites Lunella and Casey to Coney Island where Lunella reveals that she has a traumatizing fear of the park, due to an incident in the funhouse from her childhood. However, the Beyonder is there and becomes intrigued with the concept of fear and decides to exploit it in Lunella with rigorous tests. He realizes her biggest fear is losing a loved one, and decides to "help" her through it by turning the park into a horrifying nightmare and kidnaps Mimi, forcing Lunella to confront her fears head-on and rescue her. Upon seeing Devil face his fears to reach the island, Lunella finally understands that she needs to deal with hers and happily embraces the rides at Coney Island with Casey. However, Beyonder then enigmatically tells Mimi that someone is coming for her and that she needs to be ready.
15	15	"O.M.G.! Issue #1"	Trey Buongiorno	Taylor Vaughn-Lasley & Liz Hara	Chivaun Fitzpatrick, Annie J. Li & Kalen Aris Whitfield	April 29, 2023	115	0.13
Lunella is attacked by mysterious agents of the Enclave, whose leader Maris Morlak wants the portal generator recreated so as to be recognized for its discovery. Even S.H.I.E.L.D. agent Maria Hill is perplexed. Lunella discovers that Mimi was the original Moon Girl, who worked for the Enclave before running away from Morlak. Morlak sends his men after Lunella and Mimi; the two destroy the generator and fight their way out, only for Lunella to get captured and Devil collapses from exhaustion. Lunella manages to escape Morlak while Mimi willingly goes to protect her family. However, the Enclave blows up Lunella's lab with Devil still inside.
16	16	"O.M.G.! Issue #2"	Christine Liu	Taylor Vaughn-Lasley & Liz Hara	Jules Bridgers, Morgan Hillebrand & Lidia Liu	May 6, 2023	116	0.13
Continuing from "O.M.G.! Issue #1", Devil has managed to escape the exploding lab. Later, Lunella successfully locates the Enclave's covert base. With help from Casey's new stealth suit, Lunella, Devil, and Casey sneak in to rescue Mimi who finishes rebuilding the portal generator. Morlak activates the machine and brings in three alien creatures, and uses a mind-controlling whistle to control them. The Heroes manage to send the monsters back home, but Morlak snaps and overclocks the generator, opening an unstable wormhole and getting sucked in despite Mimi's efforts to rescue him. Lunella is forced to go through the wormhole in order to close it. Devastated, Mimi declares that she is going to find and rescue Lunella. In a post-credits scene, Lunella awakens in a void and wonders aloud where she is.

== Cast and characters ==
=== Main ===
- Diamond White as Lunella Lafayette / Moon Girl
- Fred Tatasciore as:
  - Devil Dinosaur
  - Coach Hrbek
  - Devos the Devastator
- Alfre Woodard as Mimi Lafayette
- Sasheer Zamata as:
  - Adria Lafayette
  - Flying Fox
- Jermaine Fowler as James Lafayette Jr.
- Gary Anthony Williams as:
  - James "Pops" Lafayette Sr.
  - Rockin' Rudy
- Libe Barer as Casey Calderon
- Laurence Fishburne as:
  - The Beyonder
  - Bill Foster

=== Recurring ===
- Omid Abtahi as Ahmed
- Utkarsh Ambudkar as Anand
- Michael Cimino as Eduardo
- Indya Moore as Brooklyn
- Craig Robinson as Principal Nelson
- Ian Alexander as Tai
- Tajinae Turner as Geri

=== Guest stars ===
- Alison Brie as Ms. Dillon / Aftershock
- Josh Keaton as Angelo
- Carlee Baker as Sofie Slugfoot / Instantanegirl
- Aaron Drown as Timmy Grubbs / Man Baby
- Ace Gibson as Gravitas
- Andy Cohen as Isaac Goldberg-Calderon
- Wilson Cruz as Antonio Goldberg-Calderon
- Asia Kate Dillon as LOS-307
- Jennifer Hudson as Mane
- Kari Wahlgren as Linh Pham / Stiletto
- Daveed Diggs as Rat King
- Mae Jemison as Skipster
- May Calamawy as Fawzia
- Ramone Hamilton as TJ
- Luis Guzmán as Council President Diego Peña
- June Diane Raphael as Marcy Muzzler
- Paul Scheer as Marty Muzzler
- Pamela Adlon as Rabbi Ryda
- Anna Akana as Odessa Drake
- Method Man as Torg
- Cobie Smulders as Maria Hill
- Wesley Snipes as Maris Morlak

== Production ==
=== Development ===
In 2018, Marvel Animation announced an animated series based on the comic book Moon Girl and Devil Dinosaur, with Laurence Fishburne and Helen Sugoabd set to executive produce. By 2019, Steve Loter was hired as executive producer and showrunner by Fishburne due to his work on animated series such as Kim Possible, while Kate Kondell was hired as head writer and as co-producer and story editor alongside Jeff Howard. The season was originally ordered for 20 episodes, but was cut down to 16 due to story purposes. The series was co-produced by Cinema Gypsy Productions and Disney Television Animation. The season was mainly produced remotely due to the COVID-19 pandemic.

=== Writing ===
Supervising producer Rodney Clouden said the season would center on Lunella growing as both a superhero and as a person, particularly on her struggles as a 13-year-old girl, which he said made the character relatable to audiences. The season starts with Lunella struggling to make friends due to her intelligence, before befriending Casey and become more developed from that point onwards, ending the season as "a more fully-realized person".

=== Animation ===
Animation services for the season were provided by Flying Bark Productions. The producers gave artists considerable creative freedom and allow them to do "[s]omething even different from what Disney typically produces", with Clouden noting the nature of the show's first season meant the artists experimented heavily with the art style to "see what works and what doesn't work" until a final art style for the series was decided.

=== Music ===
In July 2022, it was announced that Raphael Saadiq would serve as the executive music producer for the show. He also provided both the score and songs for the show. Loter, a fan of Saadiq, approached him to work on the project during an autograph signing. Each episode features a different song by Saadiq, depicted in-universe as part of a mix-tape Moon Girl listens to; the songs were written before animation work began so the animators could synchronize the songs to the sequence. Saadiq included different musical genres in the soundtrack to reflect the diversity within New York City. Producer Pilar Flynn described his score as "sophisticated" and "unlike anything [she has] seen in animation before", saying it "elevated the entire show to another level". According to Flynn, the crew generally pitched ideas for the score to Saadiq, only for him to discard them in favor of something different, which the producers received positively. The first episode features a song titled "Where You Come From", which Loter described as "a love letter to New York". Saadiq also wrote songs for the series' villains.

A soundtrack featuring selected songs from the series was released on February 10, 2023.
