= Patrick Bet-David =

American businessman and media personality (born 1978)

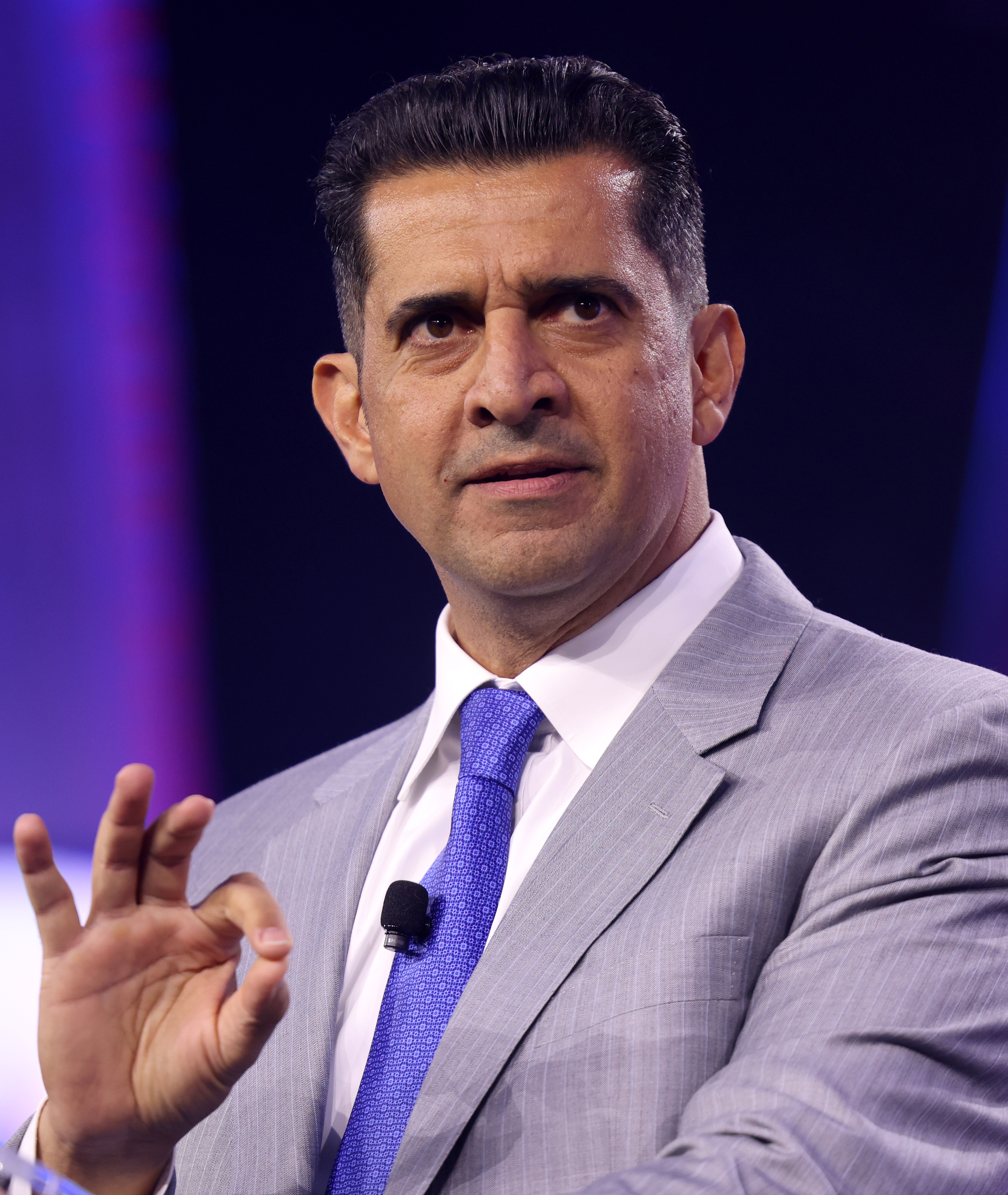
- Bet-David in 2024
- Born: October 18, 1978 (age 48); Tehran, Iran
- Other name: PBD
- Occupations: Businessman; media personality; author; podcaster
- Spouse: Jennifer Bet-David

YouTube information
- Channels: Valuetainment; PBD Podcast
- Years active: 2012–present (Valuetainment) 2020–present (PBD Podcast)
- Genre: Business entrepreneurship politics current events
- Subscribers: 7.17 million (Valuetainment); 2.94 million (PBD Podcast)
- Views: 3.43 billion (Valuetainment); 939.68 million (PBD Podcast)
- Last updated: July 2, 2026
- Website: patrickbetdavid.com

Patrick Bet-David (Note: Persian: پاتریک بت-داوید, romanized: Pātrīk Bat-Dāvīd; Syriac: ܦܛܪܝܩ ܒܝܬ ܕܘܝܕ, romanized: Paṭríq Bet-Dawíd; Armenian: Փատրիկ Բեթ Դավիդ, romanized: Pʻatrik Betʻ David) (born October 18, 1978) is an American businessman, conservative media personality, author, and podcaster. He is the founder of Valuetainment Media and the host of the PBD Podcast and the YouTube channel Valuetainment, which focus on business, entrepreneurship, politics, current events, and pop culture. His shows often feature interviews with political figures, celebrities, athletes, and business leaders, including U.S. President Donald Trump, Israeli Prime Minister Benjamin Netanyahu, and basketball player Kobe Bryant.

In 2009, Bet-David founded PHP Agency, a multi-level marketing company specializing in life insurance and financial services, which grew significantly before its acquisition by Integrity Marketing Group in 2022. He has authored several books on business strategy and personal development, including the Wall Street Journal bestseller Your Next Five Moves (2020).

== Early life ==
Patrick Bet-David was born on October 18, 1978, in Tehran, Iran, to a Christian family. His father is Assyrian and his mother is an Armenian. He and his parents left Iran as refugees during the Iran-Iraq War, eventually emigrating to the United States when he was around 10 years old.

Bet-David has described his early adulthood as involving a party-focused lifestyle, before enlisting in the United States Army after high school. He served in the 101st Airborne Division for approximately three years, an experience he credits with instilling discipline and leadership skills that shaped his later success. He has called his military service "one of the best decisions" of his life. After leaving the military, he briefly attended Santa Monica College (and Glendale Community College) but dropped out to pursue a career in finance.

He claims that he briefly worked as a bodyguard for a prominent Los Angeles cocaine dealer, an experience he says contributed to his understanding of risk, loyalty, and street-level business dynamics. Following his military service, a high school friend reintroduced him to Christianity, which he has cited as a foundational influence on his personal and professional life.

== Career ==
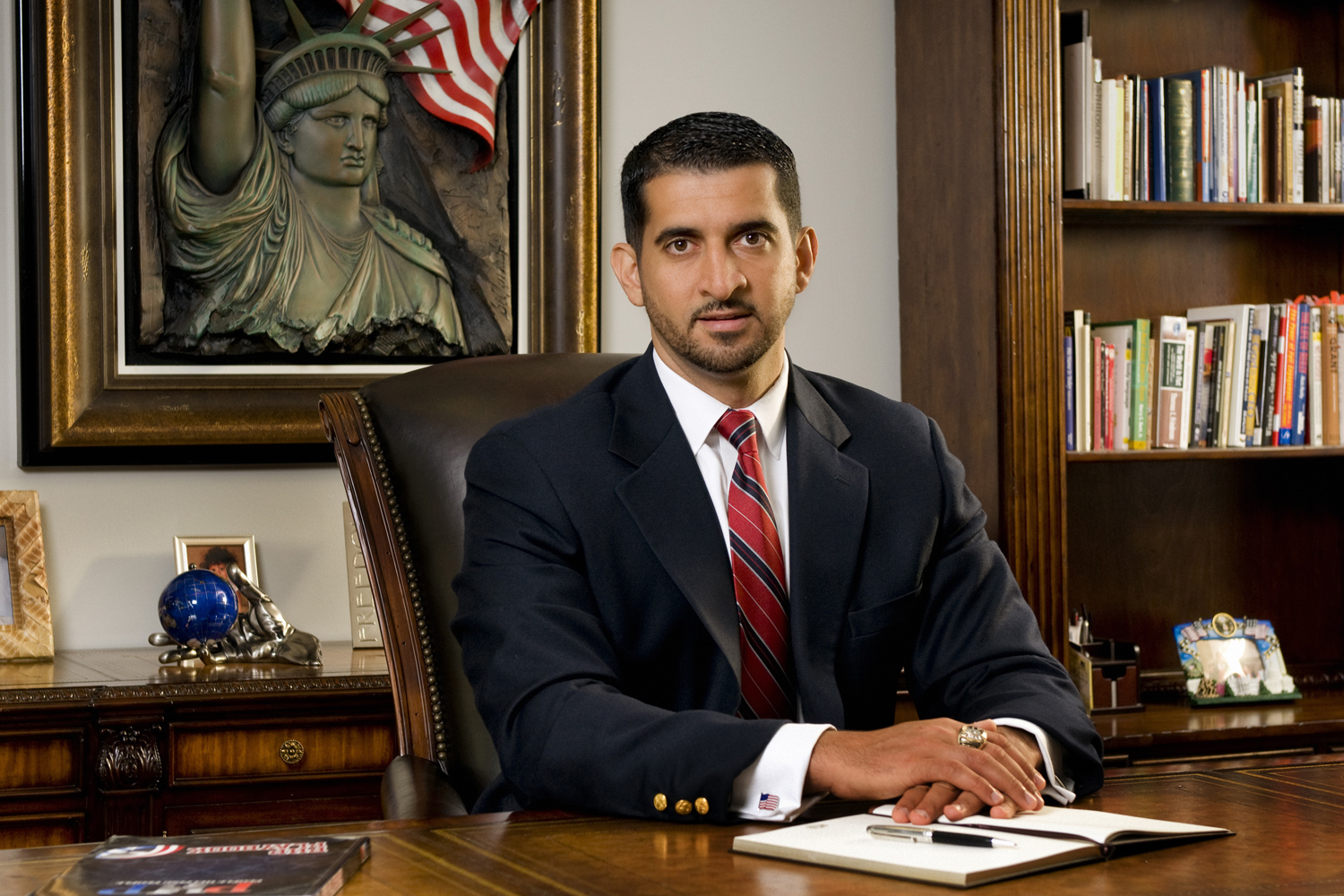
Bet-David in 2011

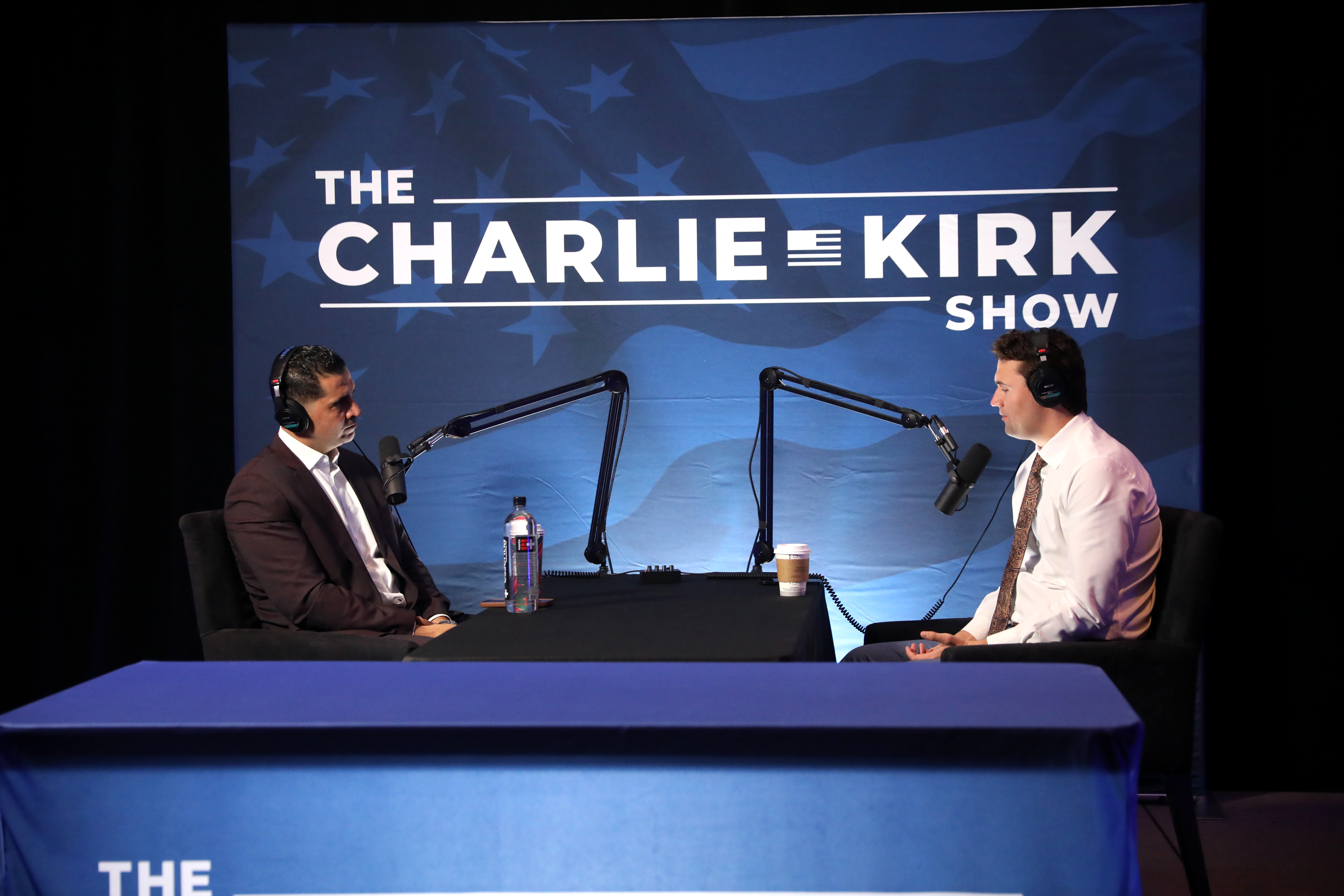
Bet-David (left) with Charlie Kirk in 2023

=== Early career ===
On September 10, 2001, Bet-David was hired as a financial advisor at the Glendale branch of Morgan Stanley Dean Witter. He subsequently worked at Transamerica Corporation for nearly eight years.

=== PHP Agency ===
In 2009, at age 30, Bet-David founded PHP Agency (People Helping People), a multi-level marketing (MLM) company focused on life insurance, financial services, and recruitment. Starting with 66 agents, the company grew rapidly to over 40,000 agents at its peak and served hundreds of thousands of clients nationwide.

In July 2022, PHP Agency was acquired by Integrity Marketing Group, another major insurance distributor and MLM organization. Bet-David became a Managing Partner at Integrity as part of the deal, which was reportedly valued at approximately $250 million plus earn-outs.

Bet-David's MLM model has drawn significant criticism. A 2019 Daily Beast investigation highlighted that the company's revenue relied heavily on recruitment fees (including a $150 training fee and $14.95 monthly fees from agents) rather than product sales alone, likening it to a "lottery" where most participants lose money. Critics, including MLM attorney Douglas Brooks, argued the structure disproportionately benefits top recruiters. YouTuber Coffeezilla conducted a detailed investigation and interview with Bet-David, presenting SEC filings showing that the majority of PHP agents earned little to no income. Bet-David acknowledged the data but defended MLMs as common in insurance and real estate.

=== Valuetainment ===
On November 9, 2012, Bet-David launched the Valuetainment YouTube channel, initially focused on entrepreneurship, business strategy, and personal development. A 2015 video, "The Life of an Entrepreneur in 90 Seconds," went viral with millions of views, boosting his profile. The channel evolved into Valuetainment Media, a broader production company that produces content, hosts large-scale conventions (featuring speakers such as Dwayne Johnson and Nick Saban), and offers consulting services.

=== PBD Podcast ===
In 2020, Bet-David launched the PBD Podcast (also under Valuetainment), which emphasizes long-form interviews, debates on politics, culture, business, and current events. The show has featured prominent guests including Donald Trump (multiple episodes on policy, tariffs, and the economy), Benjamin Netanyahu (August 2025, during which Netanyahu personally acknowledged the Armenian, Assyrian, and Greek genocides in response to Bet-David's questioning), Andrew Tate, Alex Jones, Nick Fuentes, Mike Tyson, Scottie Pippen, Terrence Howard, and others.

Bet-David has positioned himself as a vocal supporter of Donald Trump and conservative causes. He expressed skepticism about the 2020 U.S. election results, describing it as "Rigged Lite" due to issues like the supposed suppression of the Hunter Biden laptop story. In 2024, he advised Trump to return to "2016-style messaging" focused on the American Dream to appeal to independents. He has continued commenting on Trump's post-2024 administration approval ratings and policies into 2026.

In 2026, Bet-David was subpoenaed as part of an investigation into one of his show's main sponsors, Goliath Ventures, a Ponzi scheme which defrauded investors out of over $500 million. Additionally, court documents revealed that BET-David Consulting received a $1 million donation from Goliath Ventures.

=== Other ventures ===
In 2023, after a 13-month vetting process, Bet-David became a minority owner of the New York Yankees Major League Baseball team, acquiring a stake of less than 1% in the franchise (valued at approximately $7–8 million). He has expressed ambitions of eventually becoming a majority owner of a major sports team and has discussed expanding his investments closer to his South Florida home.

== Personal life ==
Bet-David is married to Jennifer Bet-David, whom he met while working at a previous financial services company. They dated for about 18 months before marrying and have four children: sons Patrick and Dylan, and daughters Senna and Brooklyn Ivy. The family resides in South Florida (Fort Lauderdale area).

== Reception ==
Bet-David's platforms have attracted both praise for promoting entrepreneurship and criticism for platforming controversial figures without sufficient pushback. Outlets such as MIT Technology Review and Media Matters for America have accused him of amplifying COVID-19 misinformation and conspiracy theories through non-confrontational interviews with anti-vaccine activists and other guests. Bet-David has defended his approach as fostering open dialogue.

== Books ==
- Doing the Impossible: The 25 Laws for Doing the Impossible (2011/2012)
- Your Next Five Moves: Master the Art of Business Strategy (2020, with Greg Dinkin)
- Choose Your Enemies Wisely: Business Planning for the Audacious Few (2023, with Greg Dinkin)
- The Academy (2024)
