= Goliah =

Goliah may refer to:

- Goliah (1849 tugboat)
- USS Goliath, also known as USS Catskill (1862)
- USS Goliah, an armed tug that served in the United States Navy as a patrol vessel and tug from 1918 to 1919
- "Goliah", a short story by Jack London published in 1908 in the British periodical The Red Magazine and in 1910 in Revolution and Other Essays
- Procoptodon goliah, an extinct species of kangaroo.

== See also ==
- Goliath (disambiguation)
