= David and Goliath (disambiguation) =

David and Goliath refers to a Bible story and its secular use as a metaphor.

David and Goliath may also refer to:

- David and Goliath (Titian), a c. 1542–1544 painting by Titian
- David and Goliath (Caravaggio), a 1599 painting by Caravaggio
- David and Goliath (Artemisia Gentileschi), a c. 1630s painting by Artemisia Gentileschi
- David and Goliath (1960 film), an Italian film directed by Ferdinando Baldi and Richard Pottier
- David & Goliath (2013 film), an Indian Malayalam-language film
- David and Goliath (book), a 2013 book by Malcolm Gladwell
- David and Goliath, a clothing company owned by Todd Goldman

== See also ==
- Davey and Goliath, a 1960s stop-motion animated television series
- "David vs. Goliath" (Roseanne), a 1994 television episode
- Human Harvest (film), or Davids and Goliath, a 2014 documentary about human organs trafficking in China
- Survivor: David vs. Goliath, the 37th season of the U.S. reality series Survivor
