= Danny de Hek =

New Zealand YouTuber

Danny de Hek is a New Zealand YouTuber and OSINT researcher who has published detailed investigations into alleged Ponzi schemes and cryptocurrency frauds.

== Early life ==
De Hek was raised as a Jehovah's Witness and was later disfellowshipped, a formal process of expulsion within the organisation that involves social shunning by members. After leaving the religious community, De Hek worked for several years in manual trades, including as a painter and decorator, before transitioning into business and online ventures. He later became involved in business networking, operating an in-person networking organisation for a number of years. During the COVID-19 pandemic, this business ceased operating, prompting him to focus more heavily on online work and digital platforms.

== Career ==
De Hek began investigating scams because of a hoax email he saw in the late 2010s. He later established a YouTube channel focused on investigating Ponzi schemes and high-risk online investment platforms. By 2023 he had produced more than 130 videos about scams.

=== Pakistan investigations ===
In April 2025, the United States Department of Justice indicted the proprietors of an e-commerce website, eWorldTrade, for conspiring to distribute synthetic opioids in the United States. In June 2025, de Hek began publishing a series of investigations into the parent company of eWorldTrade as well as connected business operations based in Texas and Pakistan. de Hek's investigation claimed that eWorldTrade was owned by Intersys Limited, a Pakistan-based company formerly known as Abtach, with operations in the United States. The cybersecurity journalist Brian Krebs independently corroborated the connection, reporting that Intersys and its associated networks were implicated in fentanyl-analog trafficking and online scam operations targeting American consumers through a sprawling network of companies across the United States and Pakistan.

In response, three lawsuits were filed in Pakistan against de Hek.

=== Goliath Ventures ===
In 2025, de Hek began publishing articles and videos alleging that Orlando-based cryptocurrency firm Goliath Ventures and its CEO, Christopher Delgado, were operating a large Ponzi scheme. De Hek alleged links between Goliath Ventures and My Liquidity Partner, a cryptocurrency scheme that collapsed in 2022, claiming the two operations shared an identical business model and overlapping personnel.

On September 21, 2025, de Hek emailed the Orlando Economic Partnership - an organization Goliath Ventures had invested in - warning that Goliath Ventures was a fraudulent Ponzi scheme. Even though the organization did not respond to the email, Goliath Ventures filed a 124-page defamation lawsuit against de Hek the following day. In February 2026, Delgado was charged in federal court in connection with the alleged US$328 million Ponzi scheme. Following his arrest, Goliath's lawyers dismissed the defamation lawsuit against de Hek.

=== HyperVerse ===
One of de Hek's most prominent investigations concerned HyperVerse (also known as HyperFund), a crypto investment firm founded by Sam Lee. de Hek began publishing coverage on HyperVerse in February 2022, claiming the corporation was a Ponzi scheme. The scheme subsequently collapsed, after which investors were no longer able to make withdrawals. In January 2024, the U.S. Department of Justice unsealed an indictment charging Lee with conspiracy to commit securities fraud and wire fraud for orchestrating a US$1.89 billion cryptocurrency fraud scheme. The SEC simultaneously filed civil charges against Lee, alleging that HyperFund was a pyramid scheme with no real source of revenue other than funds received from investors.

=== Defamation suit ===
In March 2023, Texas-based cryptocurrency promoter Stephen Andrew McCullah (who uses the name Steve McCullah) filed suit against de Hek in New Zealand's High Court, claiming YouTube videos de Hek had published about McCullah's activities involving Apollo crypto project were defamatory. Even though McCullah discontinued the proceedings in June 2023, the court found that McCullah brought the claim to deter de Hek from further reporting and subsequently awarded de Hek indemnity costs of NZ$27,500.

=== Website removal ===
In June 2025, de Hek's website, dehek.com, was taken offline after Shavez Ahmed Siddiqui (also known as Shavez Anwar) submitted complaints to the site's hosting provider WP Engine. According to de Hek, the takedown occurred without prior notice and followed his reporting on HyperVerse and its links to Shavez Ahmed Siddiqui. An independent report by BehindMLM noted that Siddiqui had attempted to have de Hek's content removed from several platforms. The website was subsequently restored under the protection of Google Project Shield, a service that provides DDoS protection and other security services pro bono to journalists, news organizations, and human rights groups.
