= David with the Head of Goliath (Caravaggio, Vienna) =

Painting by Caravaggio

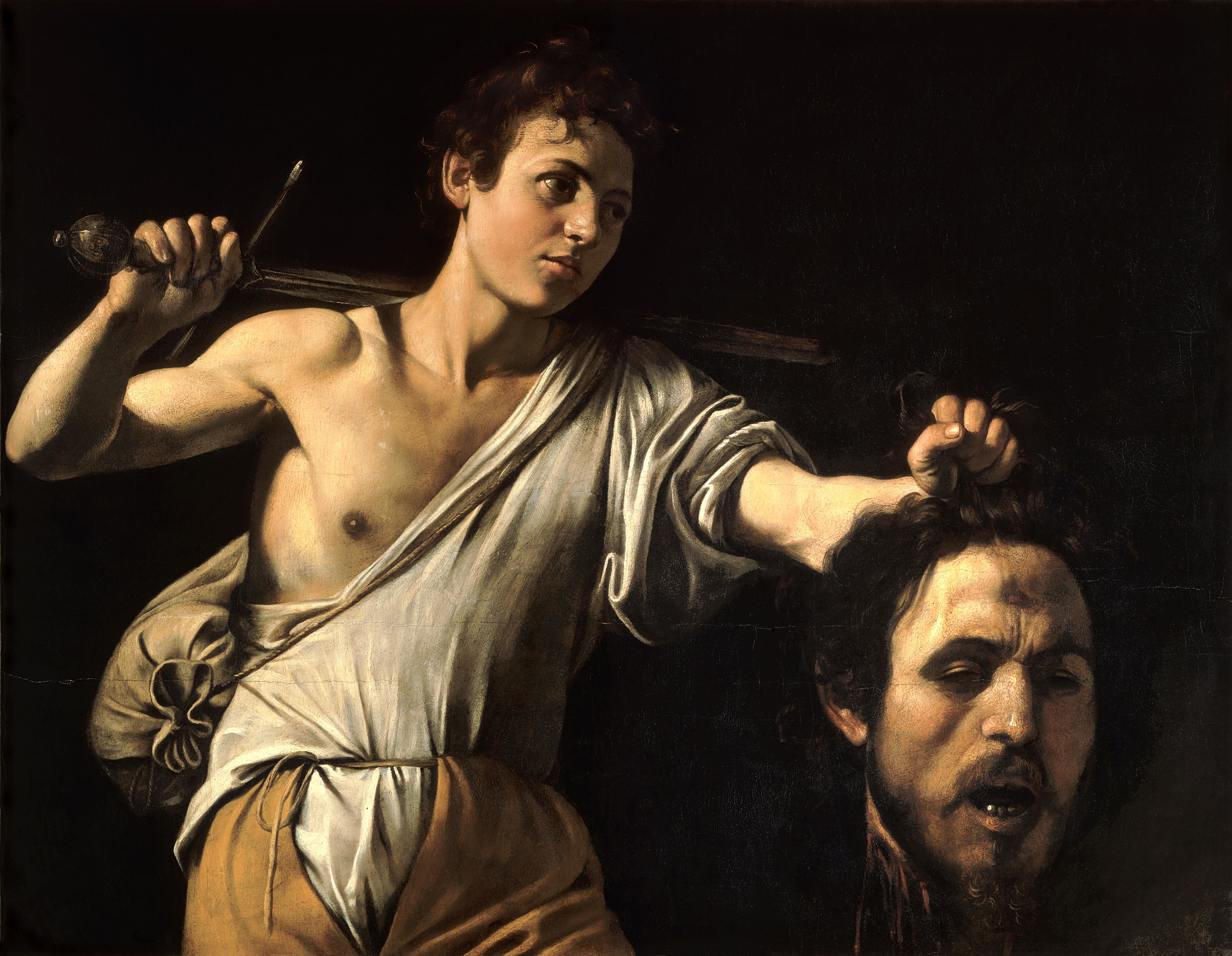
- Artist: Caravaggio
- Year: c. 1600-1601
- Type: Oil on wood
- Dimensions: 90.5 cm × 116.5 cm (35.6 in × 45.9 in)
- Location: Kunsthistorisches Museum, Vienna

David with the Head of Goliath is an oil on wood painting by the Italian artist Caravaggio, from c. 1606-1607. It is housed in the Kunsthistorisches Museum, in Vienna.

== Painting ==
Caravaggio also treated this subject in another work currently in the Galleria Borghese, Rome, and in an early work dated c. 1600 in the Prado in Madrid.

The exact moment depicted appears to be that referred to in I Samuel 17:57: "When David came back after killing the Philistine, Abner took him and presented him to Saul with the Philistine's head still in his hand." The pose is a usual one for the episode, showing David striding in triumph with the head in his hand. In the Borghese version this has changed to an unconventional frontal presentation of the head toward the viewer, who is thereby placed in the position of Saul.

The painting can be compared with the aforementioned David with the Head of Goliath in the Galleria Borghese, which dates from either 1607 or 1609–10. The two are very similar—Caravaggio frequently explored a subject in multiple variations, most notably his many versions of John the Baptist—but the Vienna painting is less dark in mood, the David more triumphant than the introspective and oddly compassionate David of the Borghese, and the head of Goliath, widely accepted as a self-portrait in the Borghese work, is more generic.

The model for David in both versions appears to be a more mature version of the pubescent Cupid of Amor Vincit Omnia and the Capitoline and Pamphilj John the Baptist, all painted around 1602. The model for these works has been identified by some, most notably Peter Robb, as Cecco, a boy known to have been Caravaggio's apprentice and lover in Rome in the early 17th century. There is no record of Cecco having been with Caravaggio after the artist's flight from Rome in 1606.

== Provenance ==
Peter Robb believes it was acquired by the conde de Villamediana in Naples between 1611 and 1617, as Giovanni Bellori records Villamediana as having returned to Spain with a half-figure of David by Caravaggio.

== In popular culture ==
The painting featured on the cover art for the 2020 album Pray for Paris by Westside Gunn. The cover was designed by the fashion designer Virgil Abloh and features a cropped version of the painting with photoshopped chains on David's neck.

== See also ==
- List of paintings by Caravaggio
