= David with the Head of Goliath (Caravaggio, Rome) =

Painting by Caravaggio

- Davide con testa di Golia (Italian)
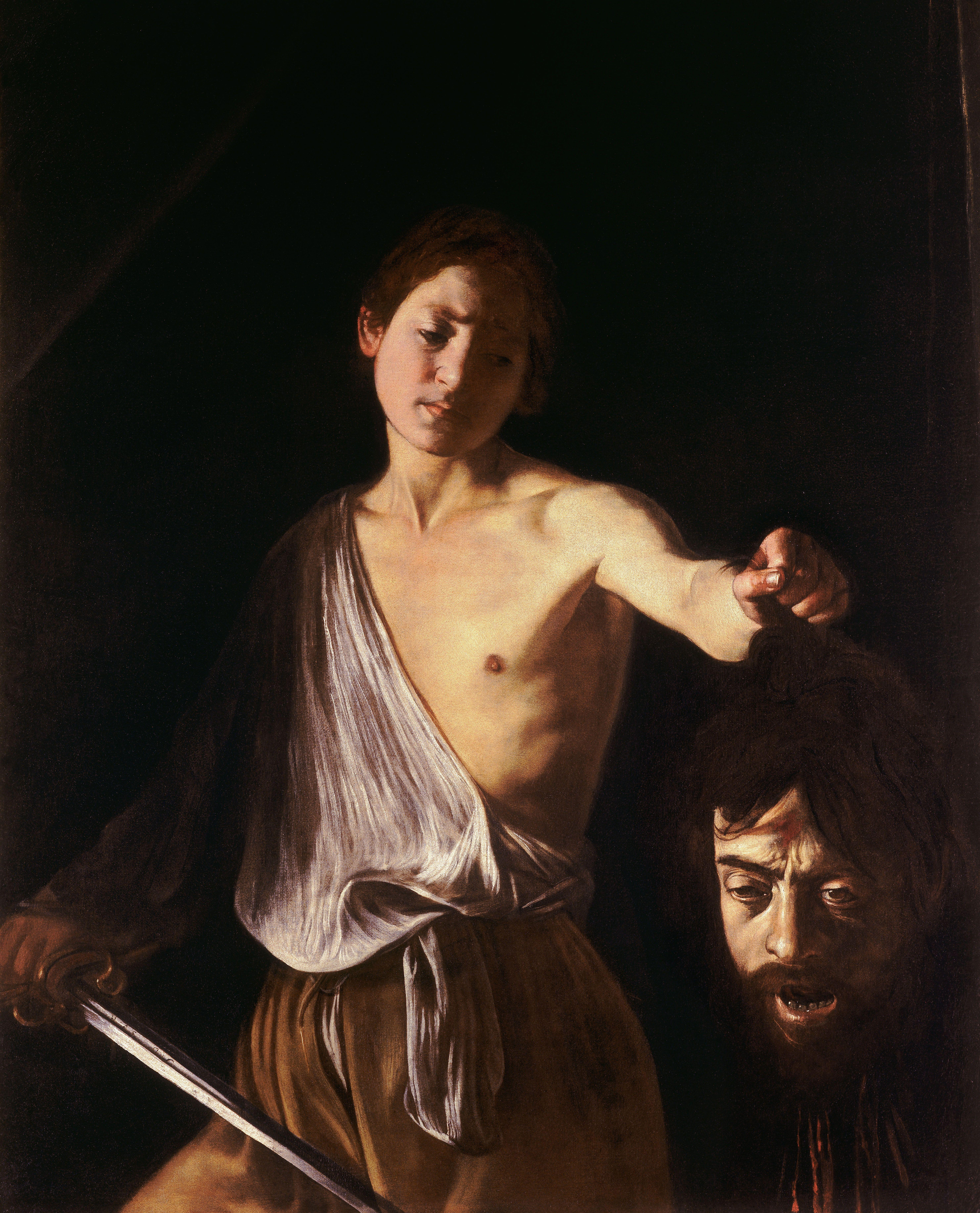
- Artist: Caravaggio
- Year: 1609–1610
- Medium: Oil on canvas
- Dimensions: 125 cm × 101 cm (49 in × 40 in)
- Location: Galleria Borghese, Rome

David with the Head of Goliath is a painting by the Italian Baroque master Caravaggio. It is housed in the Galleria Borghese, Rome. The painting, which was in the collection of Cardinal Scipione Borghese (Note: "Caravaggio painted for Cardinal Scipione Borghese "a half-figure of David. The head of Goliath, which David holds by the hair, is a self-portrait. He represents David as a bareheaded youth, one shoulder out of his shirt, grasping his sword by the hilt. The color is of the boldest depths and shadows in order to give the figures and composition the force Caravaggio always required." translation by Friedlaender 1955, ed. 1974.) in 1650, has been dated as early as 1605 and as late as 1609–1610, with more recent scholars tending towards the former.

Caravaggio also treated this subject in an oil on poplar wood panel dated to c. 1607, now in the Kunsthistorisches Museum, Vienna, and in an earlier oil on canvas dated to c. 1600 in the Museo del Prado, Madrid.

The immediate inspiration for Caravaggio was a work by a follower of Giorgione, c.1510, but Caravaggio captures the drama more effectively by having the head dangling from David's hand and dripped out blood, rather than resting on a ledge. The sword in David's hand carries an abbreviated inscription H-AS OS; this has been interpreted as an abbreviation of the Latin phrase humilitas occidit superbiam ("humility kills pride").

David is perturbed, "his expression mingling sadness and compassion". The decision to depict him as pensive and resigned rather than jubilant creates an unusual psychological bond between him and Goliath. This bond is further complicated by the fact that Caravaggio has depicted himself as Goliath, while the model for David is il suo Caravaggino ("his own little Caravaggio"). This most plausibly refers to Cecco del Caravaggio, the artist's studio assistant in Rome some years previously, recorded as the boy "who lay with him". No independent portraits of Cecco are known, making the identification impossible to verify, but "[a] sexual intimacy between David/model and Goliath/painter seems an inescapable conclusion, however, given that Caravaggio made David's sword appear to project upward, suggestively, between his legs and at an angle that echoes the diagonal linking of the protagonist's gaze to his victim". Alternatively, based on the portrait of Caravaggio done by Ottavio Leoni, this may be a double self-portrait. The young Caravaggio (his own little Caravaggio) wistfully holds the head of the adult Caravaggio. The wild and riotous behaviour of the young Caravaggio essentially had destroyed his life as a mature adult, and he reflects with a familiar hermeticism on his own condition in a painting of a related religious subject.

The masterpiece in Rome is a "twin" of a second artwork on the same subject, David and Goliath, as reported in the inventory of the Galleria Borghese dated 1693, where it is found that one was located in the first room, and the other in the fourth room. According to his biographer Bellori, the artwork had been commissioned to Caravaggio by Cardinal Scipione Borghese in 1606, a work that is possibly performed on a double easel, thus generating two twin masterpieces.

The biographical interest of the painting adds another layer of meaning to an already complex work, David and Goliath standing for Christ and Satan and the triumph of good over evil in orthodox Christian iconography of the period, and also as the cold-hearted beloved who "kills" and his lover according to contemporary literary conceit. An example of the genre can be seen in the contemporary Judith and Holofernes of Cristofano Allori in the Pitti Palace, where Allori depicts himself as Holofernes, although Caravaggio has depicted David not as cruel and indifferent but as deeply moved by Goliath's death.

If the painting was a gift to Cardinal Borghese, the papal official with the power to grant Caravaggio a pardon for murder, it can also be interpreted as a personal plea for mercy. "David with the Head of Goliath [thus] demonstrates Caravaggio's gift for distilling his own experiences into an original sacred imagery that transcends the personal to become a searing statement of the human condition".

== References in popular culture ==
- The Netflix limited series, Ripley, features this painting when the protagonist visits the Galleria Borghese shortly after committing a murder.
- Symbol for the song "Euclid" on Sleep Token's album Take Me Back to Eden (2023). A character masked with the band's logo holds singer Vessel's head.
- The painting is described and discussed by characters in Michael Ondaatje's The English Patient. The English patient endorses the theory that the painting is a double self-portrait, and states that the "true sadness in the picture" is the "judging of one's own mortality."

== See also ==
- List of paintings by Caravaggio
