= David and Goliath (Caravaggio) =

Painting by Caravaggio

- David e Golia (Italian)
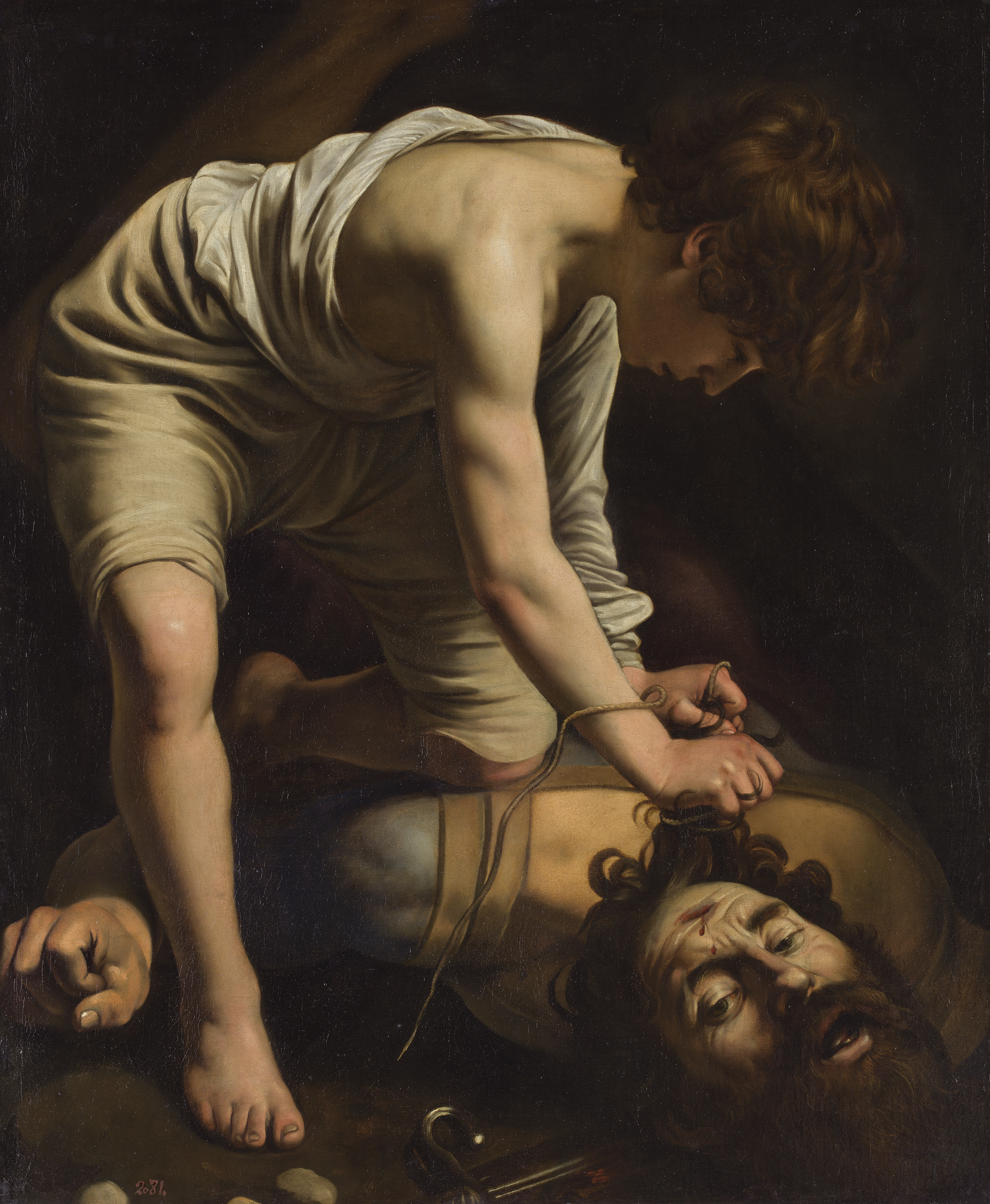
- Artist: Caravaggio
- Year: c. 1600
- Medium: Oil on canvas
- Dimensions: 110 cm × 91 cm (43 in × 36 in)
- Location: Museo del Prado, Madrid
- Website: https://www.museodelprado.es/

David and Goliath, also known as David with the Head of Goliath or David Victorious over Goliath, is an oil painting by the Italian Baroque master Caravaggio. It was painted around 1600, and is held in the Museo del Prado, Madrid.

Two later versions of the same theme by Caravaggio, both titled David with the Head of Goliath, are located in the Kunsthistorisches Museum, Vienna, and the Galleria Borghese, Rome.

== History ==
The David and Goliath in the Prado was painted in the early part of the artist's career, while he was a member of the household of Cardinal Francesco Maria del Monte. It shows the Biblical David as a young boy (in accordance with the Bible story) fastening the head of the champion of the Philistines, the giant Goliath, by the hair. The light catches on David's leg, arm and flank, on the massive shoulders from which Goliath's head has been severed, and on the head itself, but everything else is dark. Even David's face is almost invisible in the shadows. A wound on Goliath's forehead shows where he has been felled by the stone from David's sling. The overwhelming impression is of some action intensely personal and private - no triumph, no armies, no victory.

Caravaggio originally showed Goliath's face fixed in wild-eyed open-mouthed terror, tongue rolling, eyeballs swivelled to the edges of the sockets. In the finished painting the melodrama is banished: the drama is transferred from Goliath to the quietly efficient David, his face almost hidden, intent on his work with his hands in his enemy's hair, kneeling almost casually on the man's torso.

This painting and two others done at about the same time – the first version of Sacrifice of Isaac and the first John the Baptist – were taken to Spain shortly after they were made, where they were frequently copied and made a deep impression on art in that country.

== See also ==
- David and Goliath (Titian)
- David and Goliath (Artemisia Gentileschi)
- David with the Head of Goliath (Caravaggio, Vienna)
- David with the Head of Goliath (Caravaggio, Rome)

== Sources ==
- Langdon, Helen (1998). Caravaggio: A Life. Farrar, Straus and Giroux. ISBN 0-374-11894-9.
- Robb, Peter (1998). M. ISBN 0-312-27474-2.
