= Goliath (graphic novel) =

2012 graphic novel by Tom Gauld

- Paperback cover
- Author: Tom Gauld
- Language: English
- Published: 2012 (Drawn & Quarterly)
- Media type: Graphic novel
- ISBN: 9781770462991

Goliath (2012) is a graphic novel by Tom Gauld, published by Drawn & Quarterly. It is Gauld's first long-form book.

The book is a retelling of the biblical story of the warrior Goliath.

== Development ==
Gauld wrote a story about the biblical figure of Noah in Kramers Ergot, issue 7 (2008). According to Gauld, it "was one of the things which led [him] to do Goliath."

The longer format of Goliath—compared to the author's previous work—made the book more challenging to work on, according to Gauld.

== Awards and nominations ==
- YALSA (Young Adult Library Service Association) Great Graphic Novel (2013)
- Nominated for an Eisner Award for Best Graphic Album (2013)
- Nominated for British Comic Award
