= Goliath (Rosyth) =

Crane in Rosyth Dockyard, Scotland

Coordinates: 56.02499°N 3.45089°W

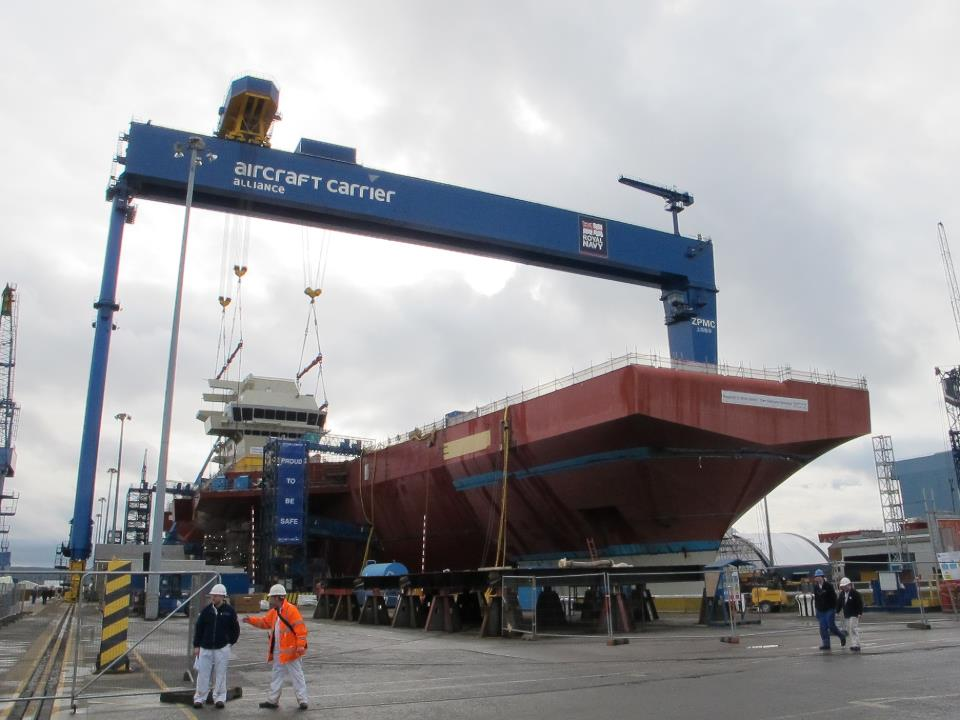
Goliath installing the forward island of HMS Queen Elizabeth (R08)

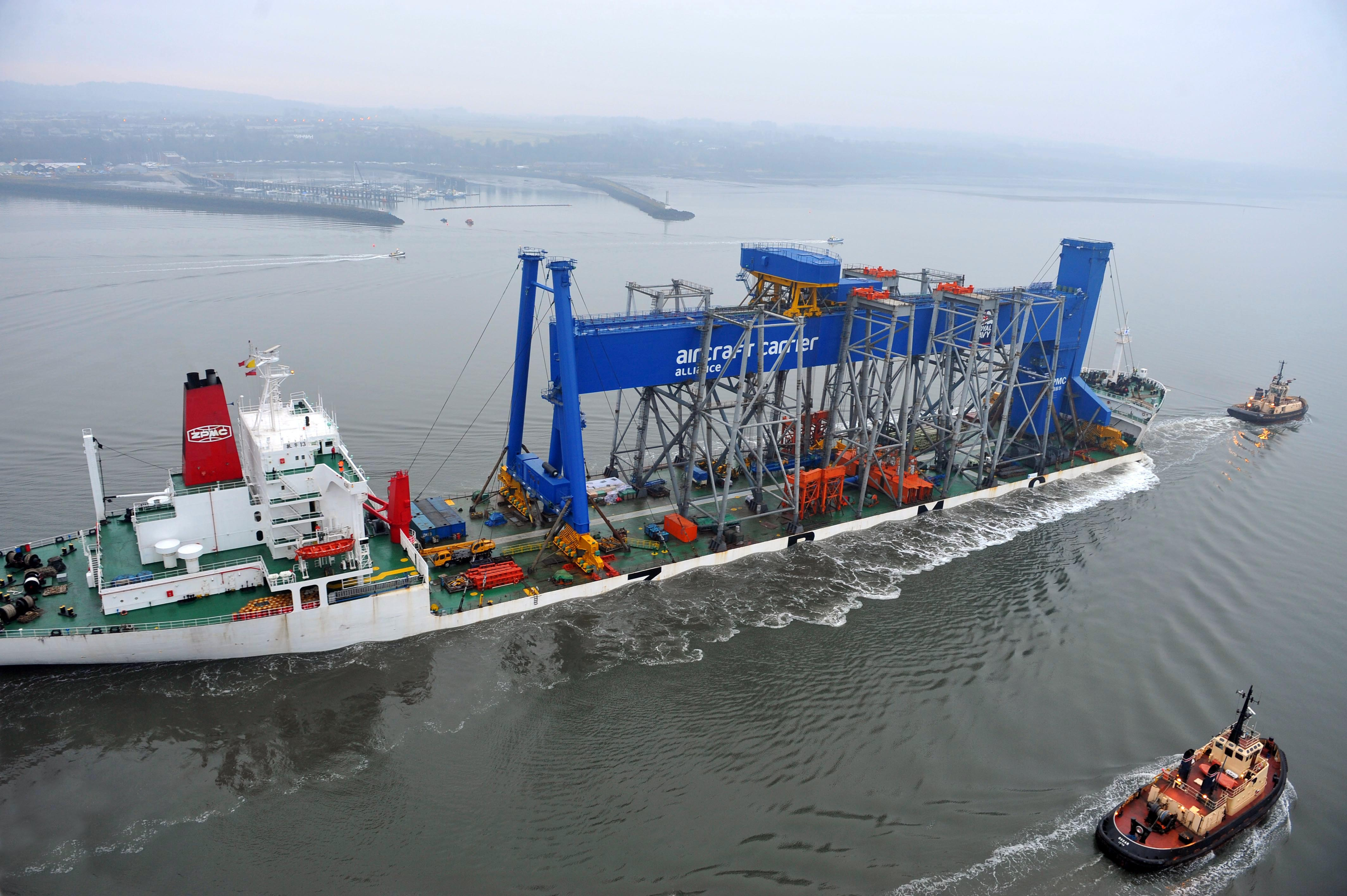
Goliath arrives in the Forth.

Goliath is a crane in Rosyth Dockyard, Scotland, with a lift capacity of 1,000 tonnes (980 long tons; 1,100 short tons), the largest in Britain.

== History ==
The Goliath was brought to Rosyth from Shanghai in 2011. The crane was used for the assembly of the Queen Elizabeth-class aircraft carriers. The crane, which cost £12.2 million, is part of an £80 million investment at Rosyth to allow the assembly of the aircraft carriers. In 2016, it was announced by the Aircraft Carrier Alliance that the Goliath was to be sold. As of 2019 the decision to sell Goliath has been reversed.

== Design ==
The crane was built by Zhenhua in China, and shipped to the UK partially assembled. After being delivered with the girder and upper sections of the legs assembled, the crane was fully erected on the deck of the ship on which it was transported from Shanghai, before being transferred complete onto its rails. The delivery vessel had to be ballasted considerably in order to ensure a 2-metre (6 ft 7 in) clearance under the Forth Bridge.

It stands 68 metres (223 ft) to the underside of the main beams, with a span of 120 metres (390 ft). Its full lifting capacity of 1,000 tonnes (980 long tons; 1,100 short tons) is provided by three hooks, two of which are suspended from an upper trolley (each hook having a 300 tonne capacity) and one from a central, lower, trolley with a 500 tonne capacity. While the three hooks have a greater cumulative lifting capacity than 1,000 tonnes, the total capacity is defined by the crane structure.
