= Goliath (comics) =

Goliath, in comics, may refer to:

- Marvel Comics characters:
  - Hank Pym, was the first to adopt the name Goliath and has also gone by Giant-Man, Ant-Man, and Yellowjacket.
  - Clint Barton, is better known as the superhero Hawkeye; he used Henry Pym's size-changing gas to adopt the Goliath identity.
  - Bill Foster, Pym's lab assistant who used the Goliath identity before his death. He also went by the names Black Goliath and Giant Man.
  - Erik Josten was originally known as the supervillain Power Man. He adopted the superheroic identity of Atlas upon joining the Thunderbolts.
  - Tom Foster, Bill Foster's nephew, a student at MIT, worked to crack the Pym Particle code and become the new Goliath after his uncle's death.
- Goliath (Amalgam Comics), a fictional Amalgam Comics superhero
- Goliath, a character who appeared in both the Marvel and Slave Labor Graphics series of Gargoyles.

== See also ==
- Goliath (disambiguation)
