= Goliath Ventures =

American cryptocurrency investment firm

Goliath Ventures was a cryptocurrency investment firm based in Orlando, Florida. On February 24, 2026, the United States Department of Justice announced the arrest of the firm's founder and chief executive officer, Christopher Alexander Delgado, on charges of wire fraud and money laundering, alleging that the firm had operated as a Ponzi scheme. On June 30, 2026, Delgado pleaded guilty to conspiracy to commit fraud, wire fraud, and money laundering. The initial federal complaint had alleged losses of at least US$328 million.

== Background ==
Delgado, 34 at the time of his arrest, was born in California and described himself as a first-generation Mexican-American raised by a single mother. His LinkedIn page indicated he had worked for nearly eight years at In-N-Out Burger.

By the mid-2020s, Delgado was living an extravagant lifestyle in Central Florida, traveling by private jet, driving Lamborghini vehicles, and owning several homes in the region, including an $8.5 million mansion in Windermere's Isleworth community. Federal prosecutors stated this lifestyle was funded by misappropriated investor money, a characterization Delgado later admitted in his plea agreement.

Delgado had been a public figure in Central Florida. Florida Politics reported that he was a significant Republican donor, contributing $25,000 to the Republican Party of Florida in 2024, $23,500 to the National Republican Congressional Committee in 2025, and $11,500 to Donald Trump's fundraising operation. He made a failed bid for the Orange County Board of Commissioners in 2022, self-funding his campaign with $111,500 in personal loans before finishing third. Delgado was also known for philanthropic activity, including a $250,000 donation to a drug-abuse prevention initiative in 2025 and more than $50,000 given to send the band and cheerleading squad at Apopka High School to London's 2026 New Year's Day parade.

Goliath Ventures had acquired office space in the Chase Building in downtown Orlando and also maintained an office in Dubai.

== Prior coverage ==
In September 2025, five months before Delgado's arrest, New Zealand-based investigative journalist Danny de Hek began publishing articles and videos alleging that Goliath Ventures was a Ponzi scheme. De Hek alleged links between Goliath Ventures and My Liquidity Partner (MLP), a cryptocurrency scheme that collapsed in 2022, claiming the two operations shared an identical business model and overlapping personnel, including Delgado and Goliath chief operating officer Nick Petrillo. De Hek stated that he began providing information to Homeland Security Investigations at the same time as his public reporting.

On September 21, 2025, de Hek, as part of his awareness campaign against Goliath, emailed Orlando Economic Partnership CEO Tim Giuliani, copying 37 other employees at the organization, warning that Goliath Ventures was a fraud. Neither Giuliani nor any other recipient responded to the email. The Orlando Economic Partnership later stated that de Hek's email had prompted it to pose questions to Goliath, but that the organization was misled by the responses. In September 2025 Goliath Ventures filed a defamation lawsuit against de Hek in Orange County Circuit Court over his reporting. After Delgado's arrest in February 2026, Goliath dismissed the defamation case against de Hek.

De Hek's coverage and subsequent reporting by the Orlando Sentinel drew attention to Delgado's efforts to cultivate an image of political access and legitimacy. De Hek published photographs appearing to show Delgado with FBI Director Kash Patel at the White House, while the Sentinel separately reported that Delgado had attended a bill signing at the White House with Orlando socialite Jackie Siegel and shared a photograph appearing to show him with President Donald Trump.

== Scheme ==
According to the federal criminal complaint, Delgado solicited victims to invest substantial sums of money under false promises of monthly returns generated through cryptocurrency liquidity pools. The company typically required an initial investment of $100,000 from new investors. In his plea agreement, Delgado admitted that Goliath was portrayed to investors as a "joint-venture cryptocurrency investment enterprise" and that investors believed the money they transferred would be converted into cryptocurrency and increase in value.

Rather than being invested as promised, the majority of investor funds remained as cash in Goliath's bank accounts and cryptocurrency wallets. The money was used to pay purported returns to earlier investors, to return principal to investors who requested withdrawals, and to finance personal spending, luxury items, travel, and the firm's business gatherings, holiday parties, and events. Delgado and his co-conspirators concealed the scheme by providing investors with fabricated financial statements, offering false explanations for delayed payments, and paying some investors more than they had invested using funds raised from others. The federal complaint identified four residential properties Delgado purchased with investor funds: an $8.5 million home in Windermere, a $3.2 million home in Winter Park, a $1.65 million home in Sanford, and a $1.15 million home in Kissimmee. The forfeiture list attached to his plea agreement identified eight Orlando-area properties in total.

The company's December 2025 holiday party, held at the Fontainebleau Miami Beach and themed around the James Bond film Casino Royale, featured a shirtless performance by recording artist Jason Derulo.

Victims were induced to invest through personal referrals, professional marketing materials, luxury events, and charitable sponsorships. Beginning in late 2025, investors who attempted to withdraw their funds encountered delayed payments, shifting explanations, and restricted access to account information.

== Investigation and arrest ==
Delgado made his initial court appearance the same day of his arrest and was released on a $1 million bond with a GPS ankle monitor, placed on home confinement at his Isleworth mansion, and required to surrender his passport. As conditions of his release, Delgado was also ordered to repatriate funds held in the firm's Dubai accounts and to surrender jewelry, vehicles, and other tangible assets to the federal government by the end of April 2026.

Several recipients of Delgado's political donations subsequently returned the contributions following his arrest; State Representative Doug Bankson and the Conservative Solutions for Florida political committee returned their donations, while the Republican Party of Florida declined to say whether it would do the same. The Orlando Economic Partnership removed Goliath Ventures from its website, where the firm had been listed alongside organizations such as Walt Disney Parks and Resorts and the University of Central Florida as an investor at a level indicating contributions of at least $200,000.

On March 2, 2026, federal prosecutors amended Delgado's conditions of pretrial release to require the surrender of extensive personal luxury assets to the Internal Revenue Service's Criminal Investigation division. The filing covered twelve luxury vehicles, including a 2024 Rolls-Royce Ghost, a 2024 Lamborghini Huracán, a 2024 Bentley Bentayga, a 2023 Rolls-Royce Cullinan, and a 1951 Mercury. Ten vehicles were located in the United States, while two others, a 2023 Ferrari 296 GTS and a 2023 Cadillac Escalade, were held abroad and ordered sold, with proceeds remitted to the government. The motion also identified eighteen luxury watches, comprising five Audemars Piguet Royal Oaks, one valued at approximately $349,000, ten Rolex timepieces, two Jacob & Co. watches, and a Tiffany & Co. Jean Schlumberger piece, as well as jewelry from Tiffany & Co., Bvlgari, Van Cleef & Arpels, Louis Vuitton, Christian Dior, and Cartier. The presiding judge directed both parties to cite relevant legal authority regarding the court's power to order pre-indictment forfeiture of such extensive assets, and scheduled a hearing for March 6 at which Delgado was required to appear in person.

Separately, on February 24, 2026, Broward County Circuit Judge Michael A. Robinson appointed a receiver to take control of Goliath Ventures, granting an emergency motion filed by attorneys representing investors after finding an immediate and irreparable risk that the firm's assets could be dissipated. The order froze the company's operations and appointed Michael Budwick, a partner at the Miami law firm Meland Budwick, as independent receiver with authority to secure bank accounts, digital wallets, and company records to preserve remaining assets for investors. Multiple investor lawsuits had also been filed in state and federal courts.

On March 5, 2026, investors filed a proposed class action lawsuit in the United States District Court for the Southern District of Florida against Alston & Bird, alleging the law firm played a central role in the scheme. The complaint alleged that Alston & Bird prepared the legal framework through which investor funds were solicited and deployed into Goliath Ventures, including an opinion letter advising that the liquidity pool would not constitute a security, which allowed Delgado to raise capital without triggering regulatory obligations under securities laws. The complaint further alleged that the attorneys who worked on the matter were not licensed in Florida. On March 16, 2026, Goliath Ventures filed for Chapter 11 bankruptcy protection, listing assets between $1 million and $10 million and liabilities between $100 million and $500 million.

== Guilty plea ==
On June 22, 2026, Delgado, who had initially entered a not guilty plea, agreed to a plea deal with prosecutors, and he formally pleaded guilty on June 30 before a federal judge in Orlando to conspiracy to commit fraud, wire fraud, and money laundering. He admitted knowingly defrauding at least 1,000 investors of at least $250 million, while prosecutors stated they had heard from around 1,600 potential victims in total and were still working to identify and verify them. Under the agreement, the plea is binding and cannot be withdrawn.

The agreement required Delgado to pay at least $250 million in restitution, to forfeit assets purchased with investor funds, and to cooperate fully with federal investigators and testify in the investigation and prosecution of others connected to the case. An 11-page forfeiture list detailed the assets, including eight Orlando-area properties, eleven luxury vehicles, thirty watches, twenty-nine pieces of jewelry and cufflinks, fifty-seven wallets and bags, sports memorabilia, and a collection of wine and spirits. Among the assets were the seven-bedroom Isleworth mansion, two Lamborghinis, and a diamond-encrusted ring displaying Goliath's logo. The conspiracy and wire fraud counts each carry a maximum sentence of 20 years in prison and the money laundering count a maximum of 10 years, exposing Delgado to as much as 50 years' imprisonment. Sentencing was scheduled for October 8, 2026, in Orlando, with Delgado to remain on home confinement at the Isleworth mansion until then.

Delgado's plea agreement referenced several unnamed co-conspirators, and his attorney, Sean Shecter, stated after the hearing that the scheme involved others and that Delgado was the only participant who "stood up and took responsibility." At least three organizations returned donations from Delgado or his company totaling $290,000: $255,000 from the Victoria's Voice Foundation, $10,000 from Life and Liberty, and $25,000 from Conservative Solutions for Florida.

== Banking relationships ==
The federal criminal complaint identified two banks through which Goliath Ventures initially collected funds, though investigators later traced deposits across a third. Investor funds were primarily deposited into an account at JPMorgan Chase (designated in court filings as JPMC 0305), a business account at Bank of America (designated as BOA 9136), or transferred directly to Goliath's wallets at Coinbase, over which Delgado was the sole authorized signatory. Delgado was a co-signatory on the Bank of America account. JPMorgan Chase was believed to have been Goliath's sole banking institution from January 2023 until approximately May or June 2025. According to the criminal complaint, at least one investor contacted Bank of America in January 2026 to request wire reversals after Goliath ceased communications and stopped payouts, and the complaint outlined how Bank of America employees notified Goliath of the recall requests.

According to later civil litigation, approximately $253 million was deposited into the JPMorgan Chase account between January 2023 and June 2025. Of that amount, approximately $123 million was transferred to Goliath's Coinbase wallets, and approximately $50 million was distributed to investors as purported returns.

In total, Delgado opened at least 30 bank accounts to receive and move investor funds, and moved between institutions as earlier banks closed Goliath's bank accounts. According to a forfeiture complaint, JPMorgan Chase closed the firm's accounts in June 2025, and Bank of America—where Delgado had opened accounts in late May 2025—closed them in January 2026. An investigating agent stated that the Goliath accounts had exhibited transaction patterns consistent with a Ponzi scheme. After Bank of America signaled it would close the accounts, Delgado turned to Luminate Bank, opening accounts there in August 2025; the principal Luminate account received over $41.9 million in investor deposits between August and November 2025. Investigators stated that approximately $400 million in investor funds was deposited across five accounts at JPMorgan Chase, Bank of America, and Luminate Bank.

=== Class action against JPMorgan Chase ===
On March 10, 2026, a class action lawsuit was filed in the United States District Court for the Northern District of California against JPMorgan Chase, alleging the bank enabled the scheme by providing essential banking infrastructure while ignoring red flags indicative of a Ponzi scheme.

The complaint alleged that Goliath's JPMorgan Chase accounts displayed transaction patterns widely recognized as indicators of Ponzi activity, including rapid cycling of funds between investor deposits and outgoing payments, round-number wire transfers, commingling of investor funds, and the absence of meaningful revenue from cryptocurrency trading. The lawsuit argued that the bank's compliance and monitoring systems should have detected these patterns.

The lawsuit asserted five causes of action: aiding and abetting fraud, aiding and abetting breach of fiduciary duty, unjust enrichment, negligence, and violations of California's Unfair Competition Law. It sought to represent a nationwide class of all investors who suffered losses through Goliath's joint venture agreements, with a California subclass.

== See also ==
- List of Ponzi schemes
- Cryptocurrency and crime
- Liquidity pool
