= David and Goliath (Artemisia Gentileschi) =

Painting by Artemisia Gentileschi

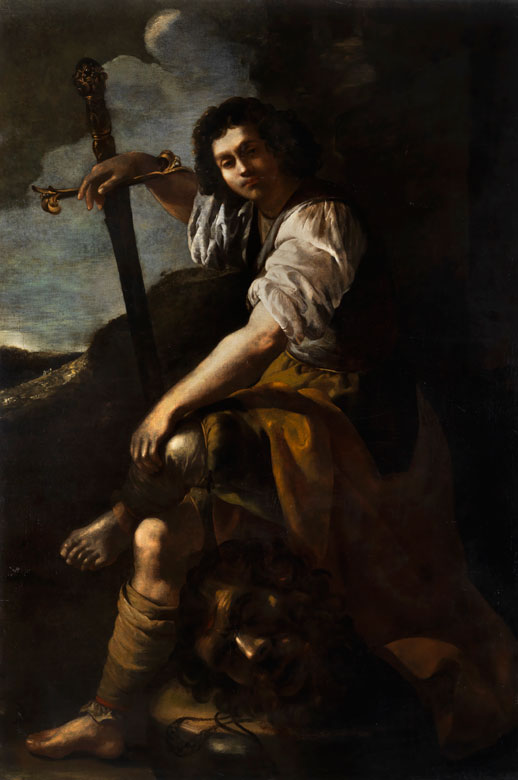
- Artist: Artemisia Gentileschi
- Year: c. 1630s
- Medium: Oil on canvas
- Dimensions: 203.5 cm × 152 cm (80.1 in × 60 in)

David and Goliath is a painting of David and Goliath by the seventeenth-century artist Artemisia Gentileschi. It is currently held in a private collection in the United Kingdom, but is due to be auctioned in July 2025.

The painting was only identified as being by Artemisia in 2020, after work done by art historian Gianni Papi and conservators at Simon Gillespie Studio. The painting features Artemisia's name painted along the blade of David's sword. Previously, the painting was attributed to Giovanni Francesco Guerrieri, a student of Artemisia's father, Orazio Gentileschi. Recent research has indicated that this work was once part of Charles I's collection.

== See also ==
- List of works by Artemisia Gentileschi
