= Lido Fanale Anteriore Lighthouse =

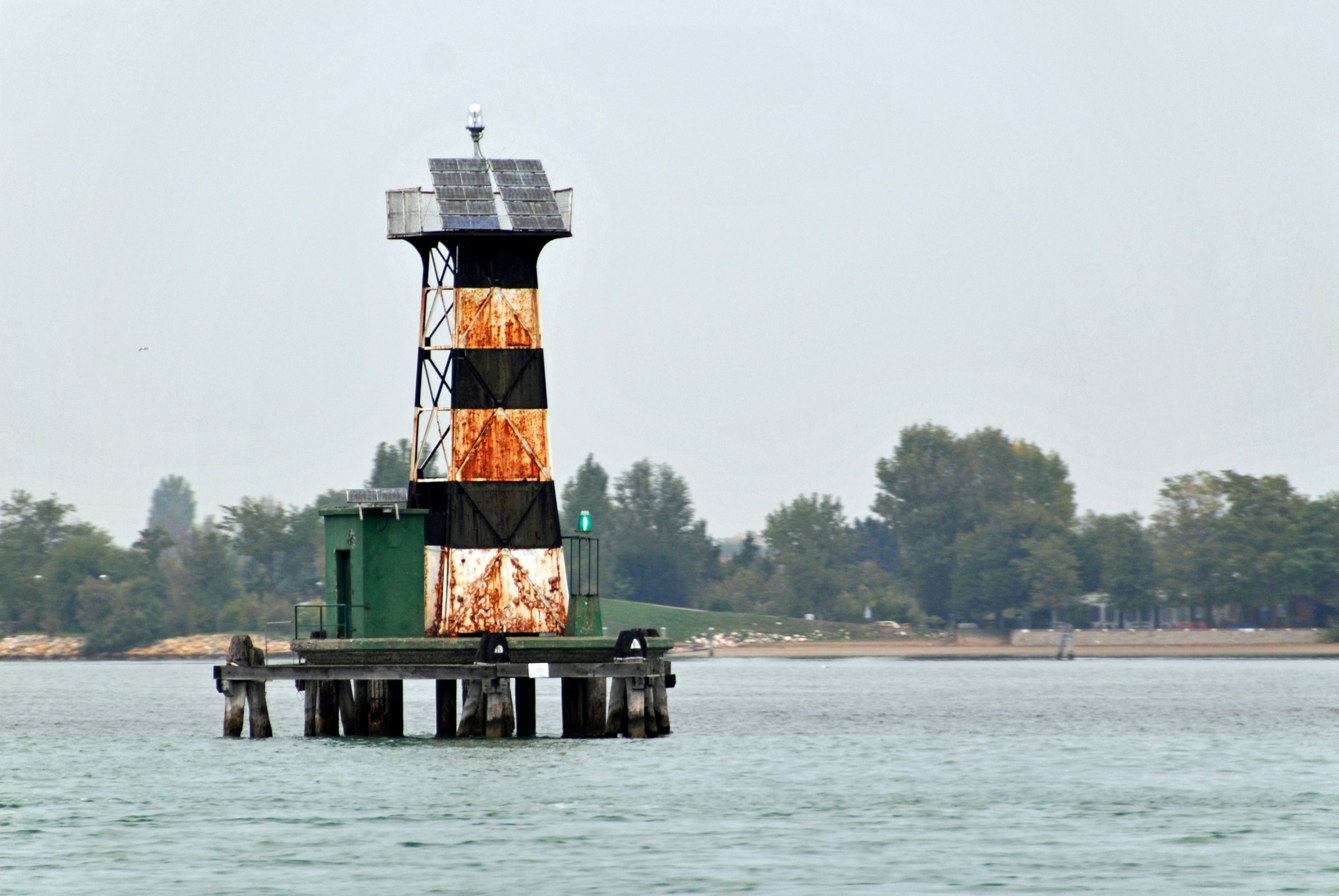
- Location: Venice, Italy
- Coordinates: 45°26′17″N 12°23′24″E

Tower
- Constructed: 1912
- Foundation: platform on wooden piles
- Construction: metal skeletal tower
- Height: 10 m (33 ft)
- Shape: quadrangular skeletal tower, not entirely covered by a metal plate, with balcony and light
- Markings: white and black horizontal bands painted on the cover
- Power source: solar power
- Operator: Italian Navy

Lido Fanale Anteriore light
- Focal height: 13 m (43 ft)
- Intensity: LABI 100 w
- Range: 11 nmi (20 km; 13 mi)
- Characteristic: Fl W 3s
- Italy no.: 4177 E.F

Lido Fanale Anteriore Direction light
- Focal height: 3 m (9.8 ft)
- Intensity: MaxiHalo-60
- Range: 5 nmi (9.3 km; 5.8 mi)
- Characteristic: Fl G 4s
- Italy no.: 4186 E.F

Lido Fanale Anteriore Lighthouse (Italian: Faro di Lido Fanale Anteriore) is an active lighthouse located on the northern tip of the island of Lido di Venezia, in the Venetian Lagoon on the Adriatic Sea; the place where is the main access to Venice by ship route.

== Description ==
The lighthouse, established in 1912, consists of a quadrangular skeletal tower, 10 metres (33 ft) high, covered, not wholly, by a metal plate with balcony and light. The tower is settled on a platform supported by wooden piles; the covering is painted with black and white horizontal bands.

The Fanale Anteriore light is positioned at 13 metres (43 ft) above sea level and emits one white flash in a 3 seconds period, visible up to a distance of 11 nautical miles (20 km; 13 mi). The lighthouse, completely automated and powered by a solar unit, is managed by the Marina Militare with the identification code number 4177 E.F.

The Fanale Anteriore Direction light is positioned at 3 metres (9.8 ft) above sea level and emits one green flash in a 4 seconds period, visible up to a distance of 5 nautical miles (9.3 km; 5.8 mi). The lighthouse, completely automated and powered by a solar unit, is managed by the Marina Militare with the identification code number 4186 E.F.

== See also ==
- List of lighthouses in Italy
