= Shepheard's Hotel =

Historical, architectural structure of Egypt

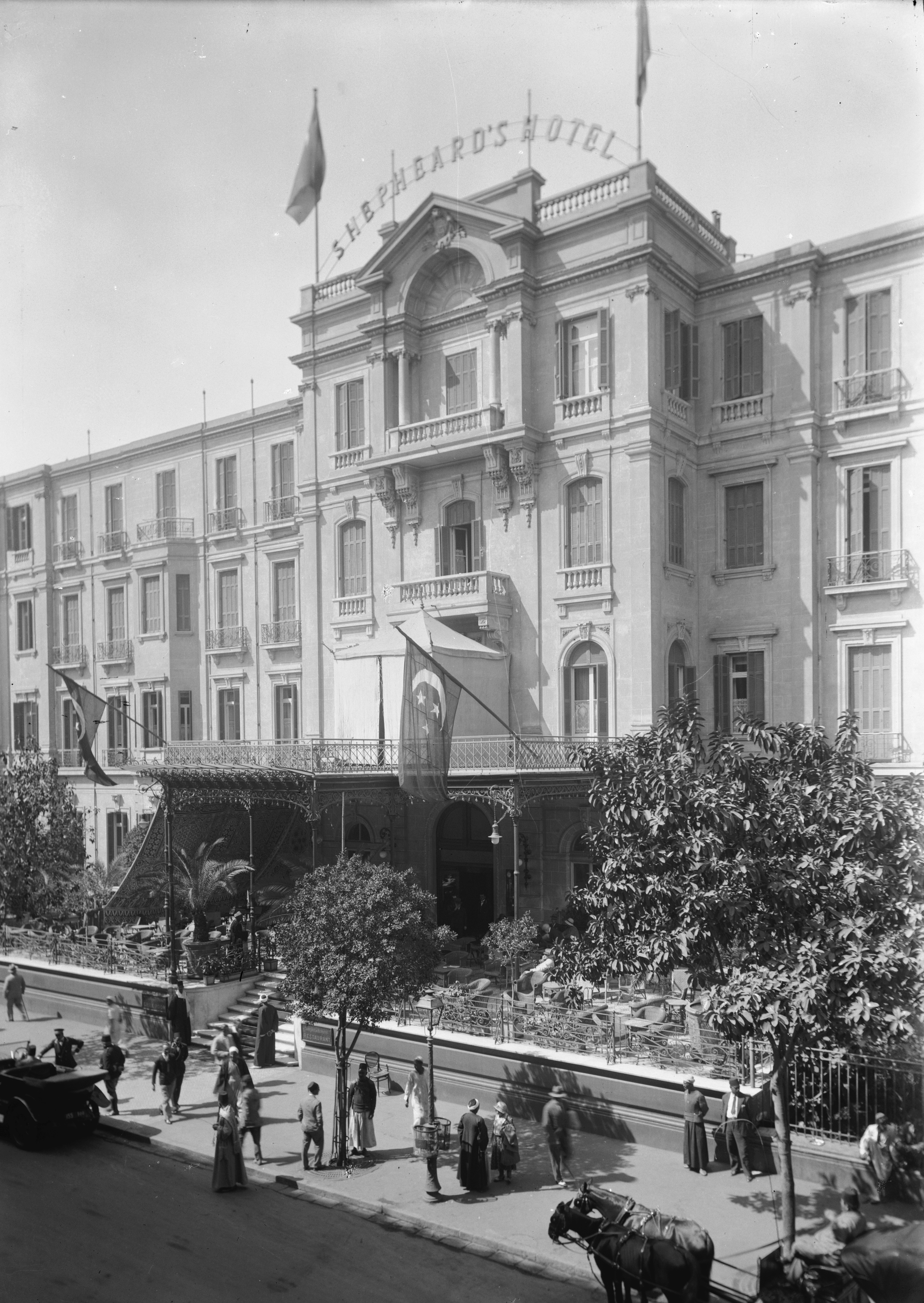
Shepheard's Hotel entrance, c. 1930

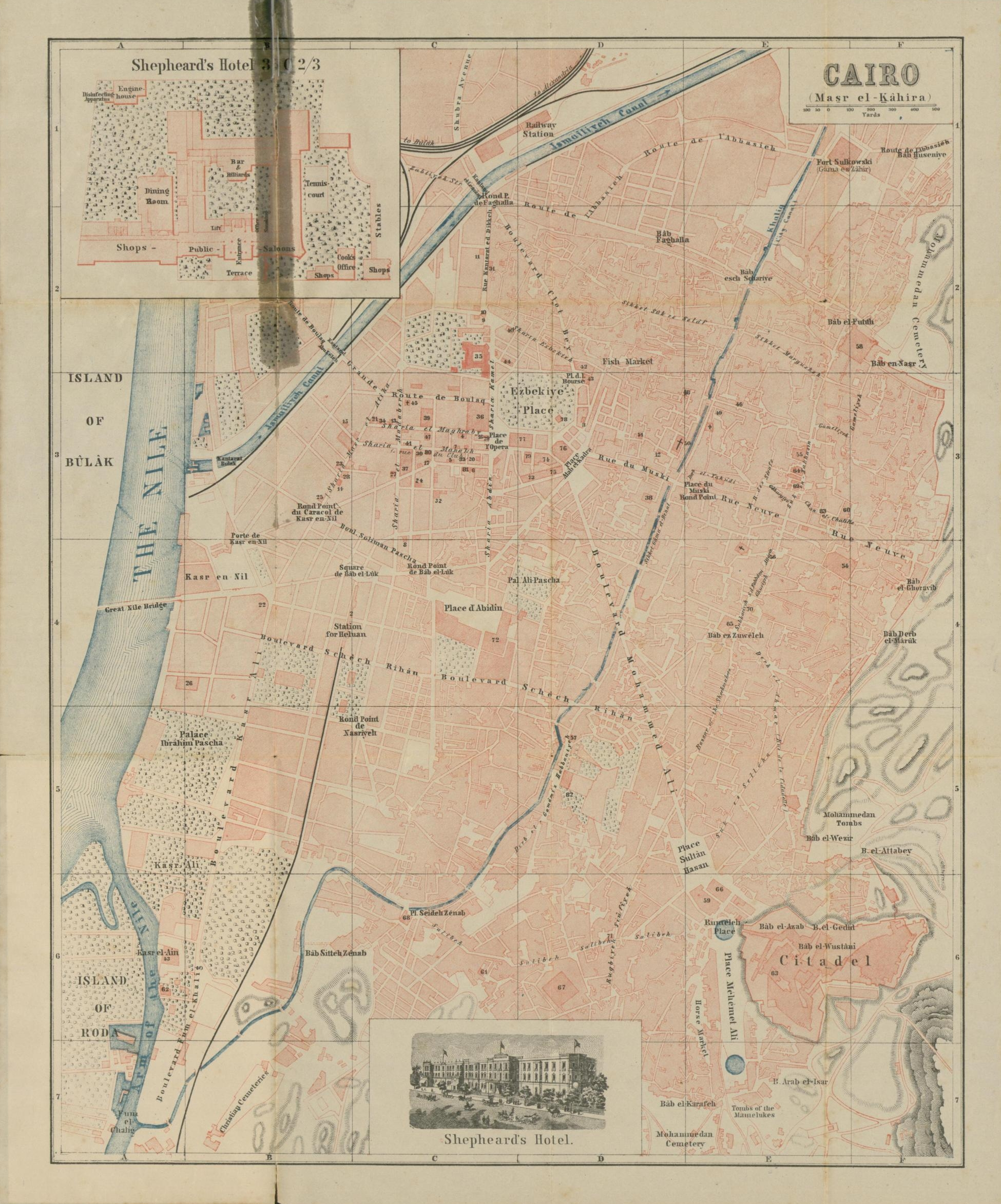
Shepheard's Hotel on an 1895 map of Cairo (marked red at no.35)

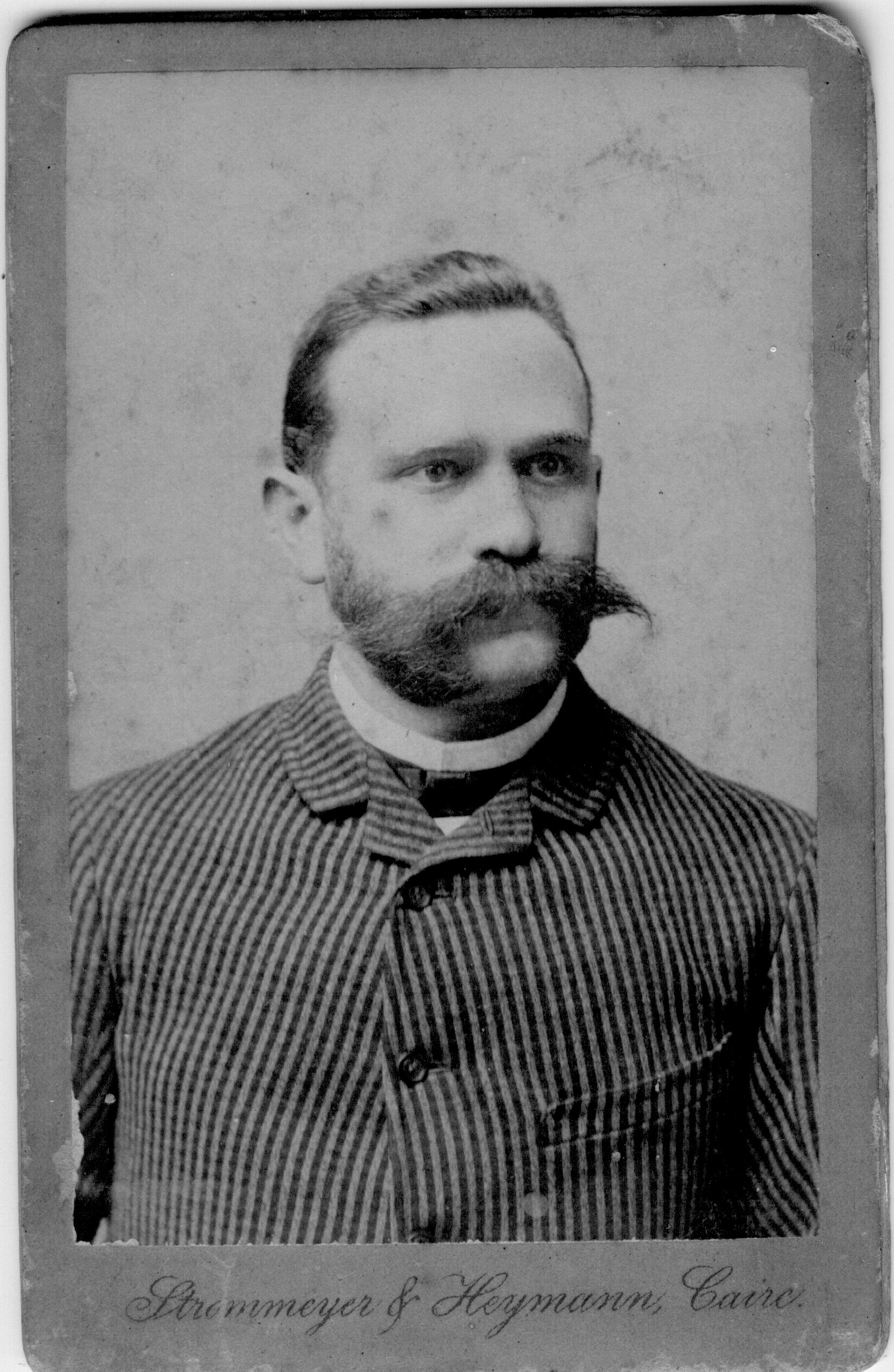
Johann Adam Rennebaum, Architect of Shepheard's Hotel

Shepheard's Hotel was the leading hotel in Cairo and one of the most celebrated hotels in the world from the middle of the 19th century until its destruction in 1952 during the Cairo Fire. It was located across from the Azbakeya Gardens (30.054158°N 31.246499°E). Five years after the original hotel was destroyed, a new one was built on the bank of the Nile and it was named the Shepheard Hotel (30.042222°N 31.231667°E).

== History ==
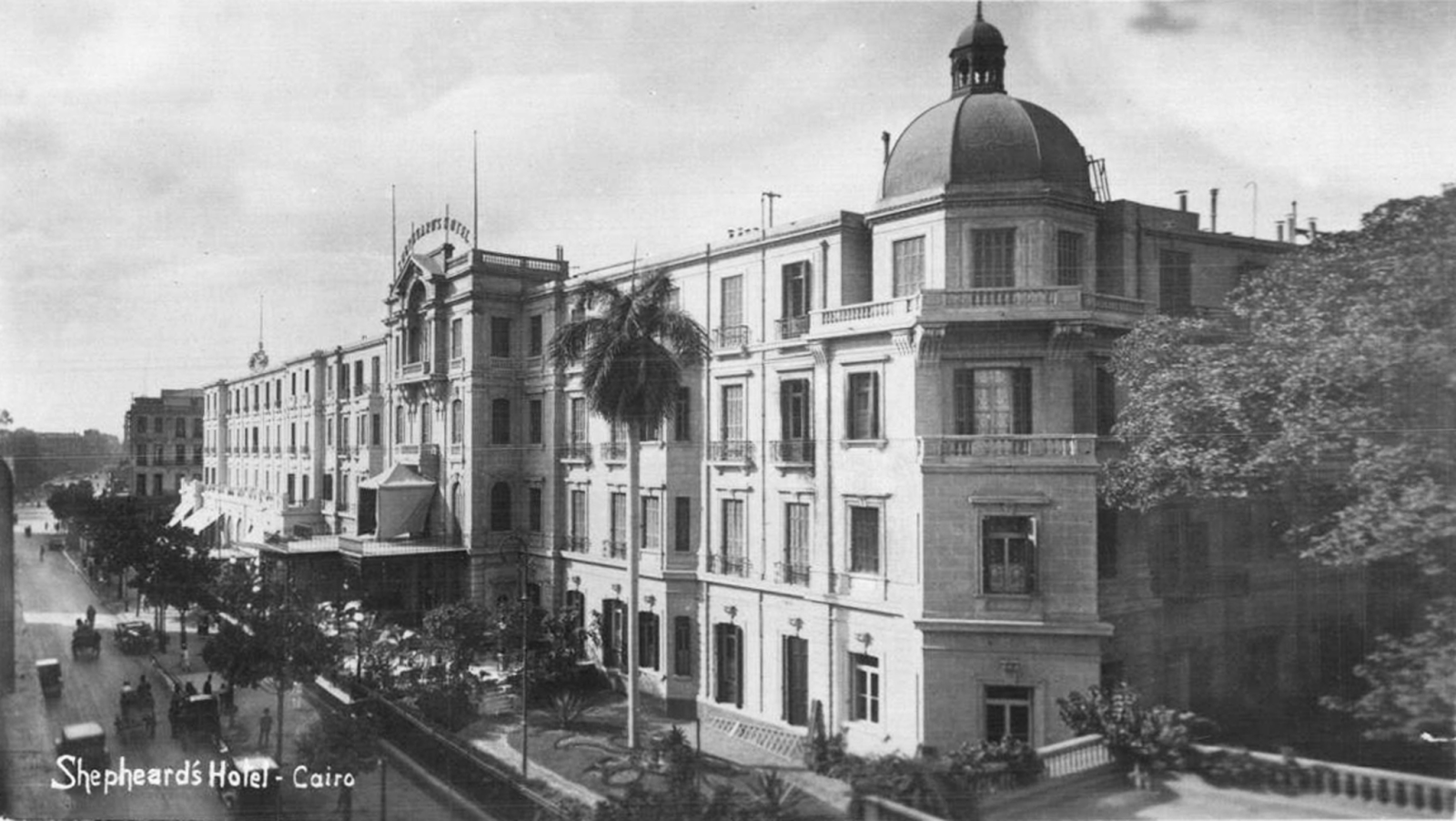
Shepheard's Hotel, c. 1930

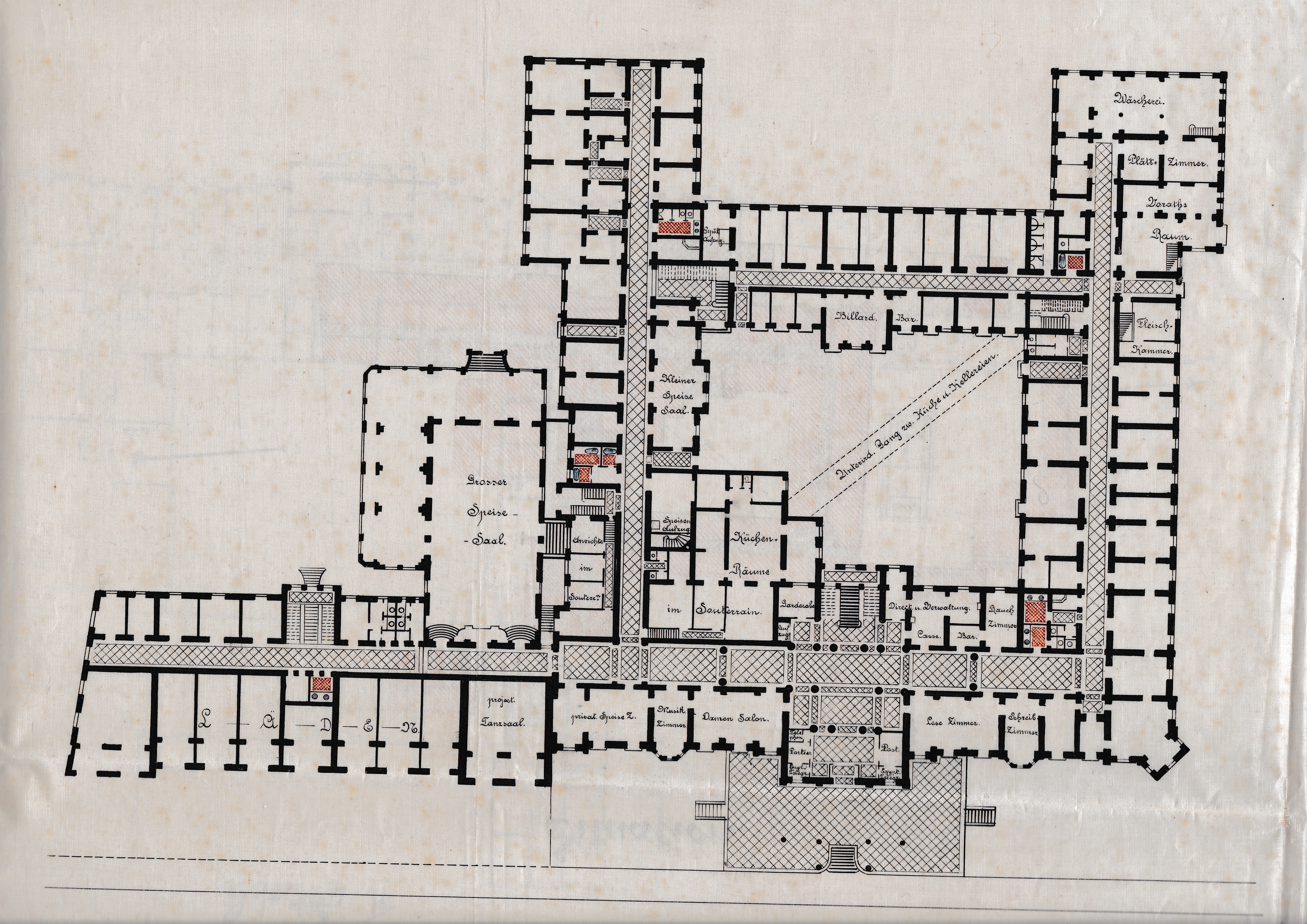
Johann Adam Rennebaum, Shepheard's Hotel, Ground Floor/ Mezzanine, 1891

The hotel was originally established in 1841 by Samuel Shepheard under the name "Hotel des Anglais" (English Hotel), and was later renamed "Shepheard's Hotel". Shepheard, an Englishman who was once described as "an undistinguished apprentice pastry chef", came from Preston Capes, Northamptonshire. He co-owned the hotel with Mr. Hill, Mohammed Ali Pasha's head coachman, and proved to be a successful entrepreneur and businessman. On one occasion, when soldiers staying at the hotel were suddenly moved to Crimea, leaving unpaid bills, Shepheard travelled personally to Sevastopol in order to collect payment.

In 1845, Hill relinquished his interest in the hotel, and Shepheard became the sole owner. Shepheard sold the hotel in 1861 for £10,000 (equivalent to $2M in 2025) to the Bavarian hotelier Philip Zech (or Zeck) and retired to Eathorpe Hall, Eathorpe, Warwickshire, England. Richard Burton, a close friend of Shepheard, left a detailed description of his generous character and successful career, describing him as "a remarkable man in many points, and in all things the model John Bull".

The hotel was renovated in 1869 after a fire destroyed the south wing of the building. By the last decade of the 19th century, it was apparent that the original building was dated; for it to remain competitive, a new structure would have to be constructed ex novo. Zech employed the services of a young Nuremberg-born German architect, Johann Adam Rennebaum, to design a hotel on the same plot that would far exceed its predecessors in size and luxury. The construction of this final building, completed in 1891, is the most famous and well-documented incarnation of the hotel. In 1898, the Arab Hall (also designed by Rennebaum) was added in the central courtyard of the building, and further expansions occurred in 1904, 1909 and 1927. The near-total omission of Rennebaum's name in the documentation of the hotel has likely to do with a concerted attempt by the British colonial authorities after the First World War to eradicate any trace of German influence in Egypt. Ownership of the hotel passed into the hands of Zech's daughter and her husband, Mr. and Mrs. Kemmerich. In 1896, the Kemmerichs sold the hotel to Egyptian Hotels Ltd., a British company that subsequently leased it to the Compagnie Internationale des Grands Hôtels. This company in turn was purchased by the Swiss hotel magnate Karl (Charles) Baehler. Shepheard's Hotel was famed for its grandeur, for its guests, and as a base for the military. It was renowned for its opulence, with stained glass, Persian carpets, gardens, terraces, and great granite pillars resembling those of the Ancient Egyptian temples. Its American Bar was frequented not only by Americans but also by French and British officers. There were nightly dances at which men appeared in military uniform and women in evening gowns.

The bar was also known as the "long bar" because it was always so crowded that it required considerable waiting to get a drink. In 1941–42, when there were very real fears that the Wehrmacht's Afrika Korps under Erwin Rommel might take Cairo, a popular joke amongst the British and Australian soldiers waiting for service at the "long bar" was: "Wait until he [Rommel] gets to Shepheard's; that'll hold him up". The Suffering bastard cocktail was created at the bar. Bartender Joe Scialom was looking to make a hangover drink for allied troops and according to story made one as a "cure" for the suffering soldiers who complained about the poor quality of liquor in the area. During the fighting, Nazi General Rommel allegedly said "I'll be drinking champagne in the master suite at Shepheard's soon".

The "long bar" was popular with the cabinet of the Greek government-in-exile, and Harold Macmillan wrote in his diary on 21 August 1944 that the Greek government-in-exile should move to Italy to escape the "poisonous atmosphere of intrigue which reigns in Cairo. All previous Greek governments-in-exile have been broken in the bar of Shepheard's".

Tourist shops faced the hotel from across the street, and there was a storeroom where officers could leave their excess luggage. Reviews of the hotel's cuisine varied over time. At an early stage, its food was said to leave "much to be desired" but, by the middle of the 20th century, others were describing the food as "as good as anything at Paris' Ritz, or Berlin's Adlon, or Rome's Grand".

By the late 1940s the quality of the long established hotel appeared to have declined. The writer Philip Toynbee described it in his diary as an "ancient hell".

Among its famous guests were Aga Khan, the Maharajah of Jodhpur, Richard Markgraf and Winston Churchill.

On 26 January 1952 the hotel was destroyed during the Cairo Fire, a period of anti-British riots and dramatic civil unrest that led to the Egyptian Revolution of 1952.

== In popular culture ==
The hotel has had many notable fictional guests. It was portrayed in the 1934 British film The Camels Are Coming. The hotel is the setting for a number of scenes in the 1996 film The English Patient but actual filming of the scenes happened at The Grand Hotel des Bains in Venice Lido, Italy. The hotel is used as a base of operations in The Race Colonization series by Harry Turtledove, as a location in Agatha Christie's Crooked House, and is mentioned in Death on the Nile and Anthony Trollope's short story, "An Unprotected Female at the Pyramids" (1861). It also features regularly in Elizabeth Peters' Amelia Peabody novels.

The hotel also features in Wilbur Smith's The Triumph of the Sun and King of Kings.

== Modern Shepheard Hotel ==
The modern "Shepheard Hotel" was erected in 1957 by Egyptian Hotels Ltd. in Garden City, Cairo, about 0.8 kilometres (0.50 mi) from the site of the original hotel. The new hotel, and the land on which it stands, is owned by E.G.O.T.H. (The Egyptian General Company for Tourism & Hotels). The hotel was managed by Helnan International Hotels and known as the Helnan Shepheard Hotel. On September 29, 2009, it was announced that Rocco Forte Hotels would completely renovate the property and reopen it under their own management in 2012. The renovations never happened, and the hotel closed in 2014. In March 2020, E.G.O.T.H. signed a $90 million agreement with Saudi Arabia's Al Sharif Group to redevelop the hotel. In 2021, it was announced that Mandarin Oriental Hotel Group had been selected to operate the hotel upon its reopening. In 2023, Al Sharif awarded a contract to Cairo-based SIAC Construction to rebuild the hotel.
