= Grand Hotel des Bains =

Coordinates: 45°24′48″N 12°22′29″E

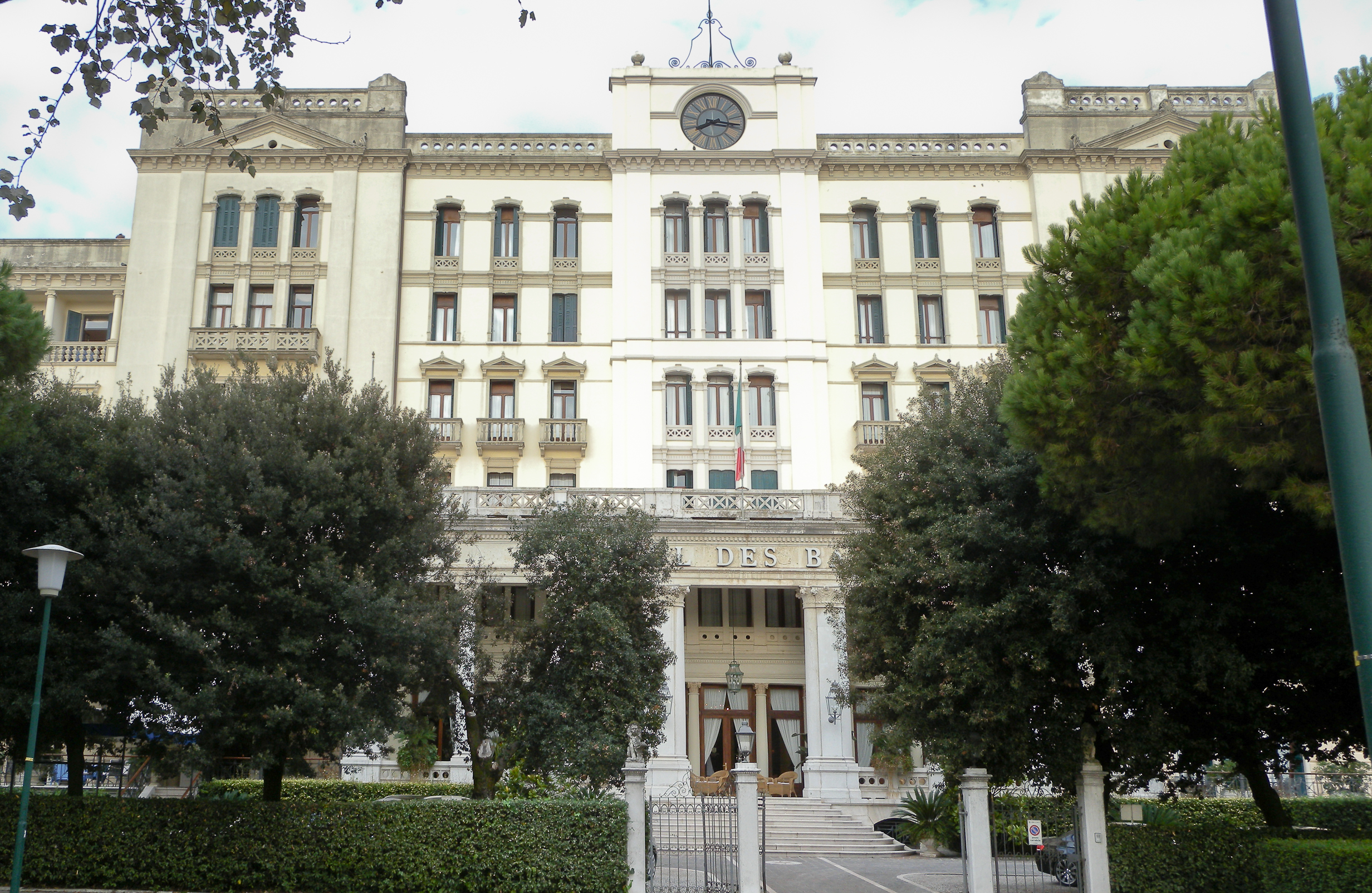
- Interactive map of the Grand Hotel des Bains area

General information
- Type: Hotel
- Location: Venice, Italy
- Completed: 1900
- Opened: 1900

The Grand Hotel des Bains is a former luxury hotel on the Lido of Venice in northern Italy. Built in 1900 to attract wealthy tourists, it is remembered amongst other things for Thomas Mann's stay there in 1911, which inspired his novella Death in Venice. Luchino Visconti's film of the novella was shot there in 1971.

Sergei Diaghilev died at the hotel in 1929. Over the years, the hotel was used by movie stars during the annual Venice Film Festival. In the 1996 film The English Patient, the location was used to portray Shepheard's Hotel in Cairo.

In 2010, the hotel was closed for a planned conversion into a luxury condominium apartment complex, the Residenze des Bains. As of September 2024, the building is still awaiting renovation. A large fence surrounds it, with a guard employed inside.

== Gallery ==
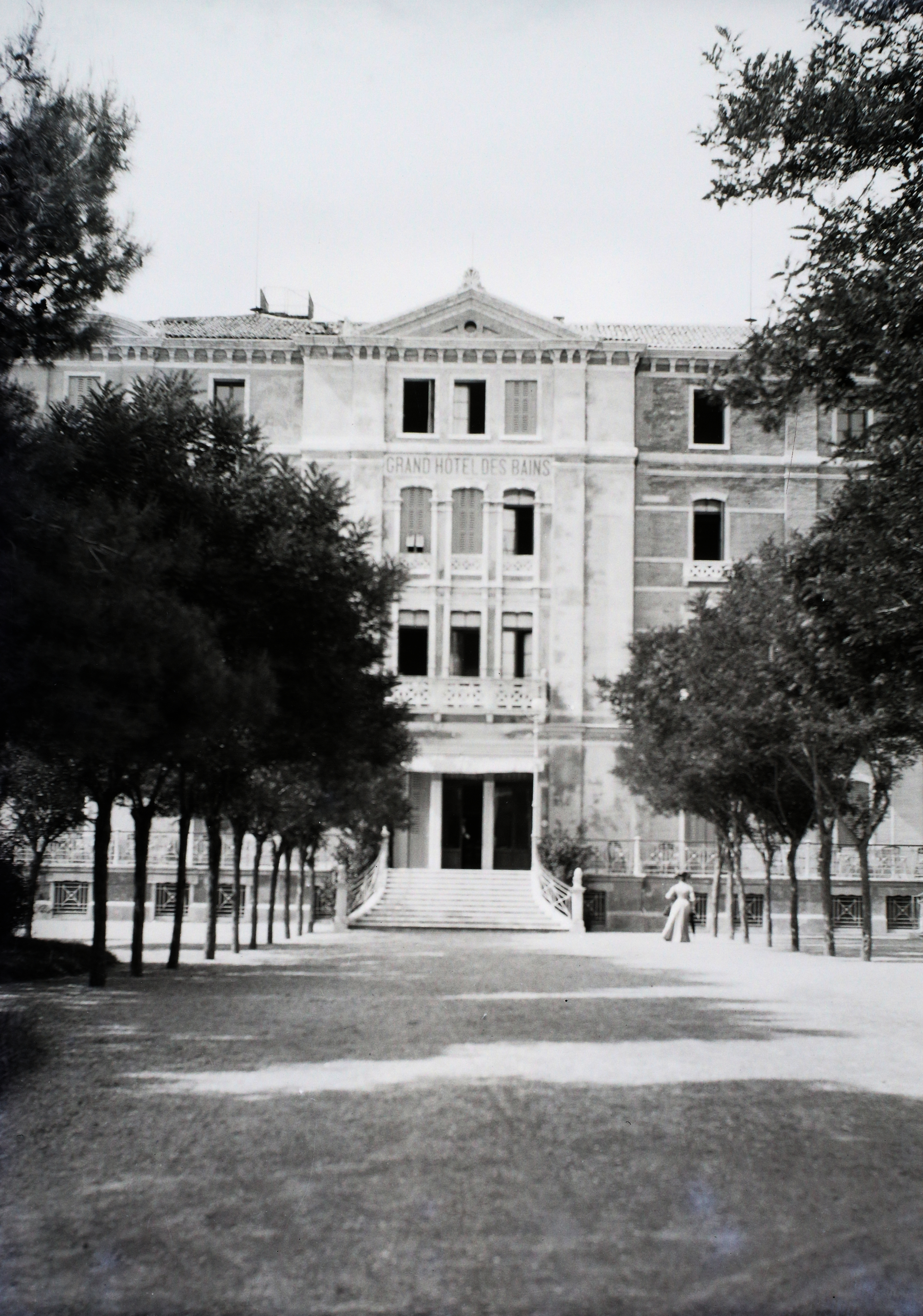
The hotel in 1907

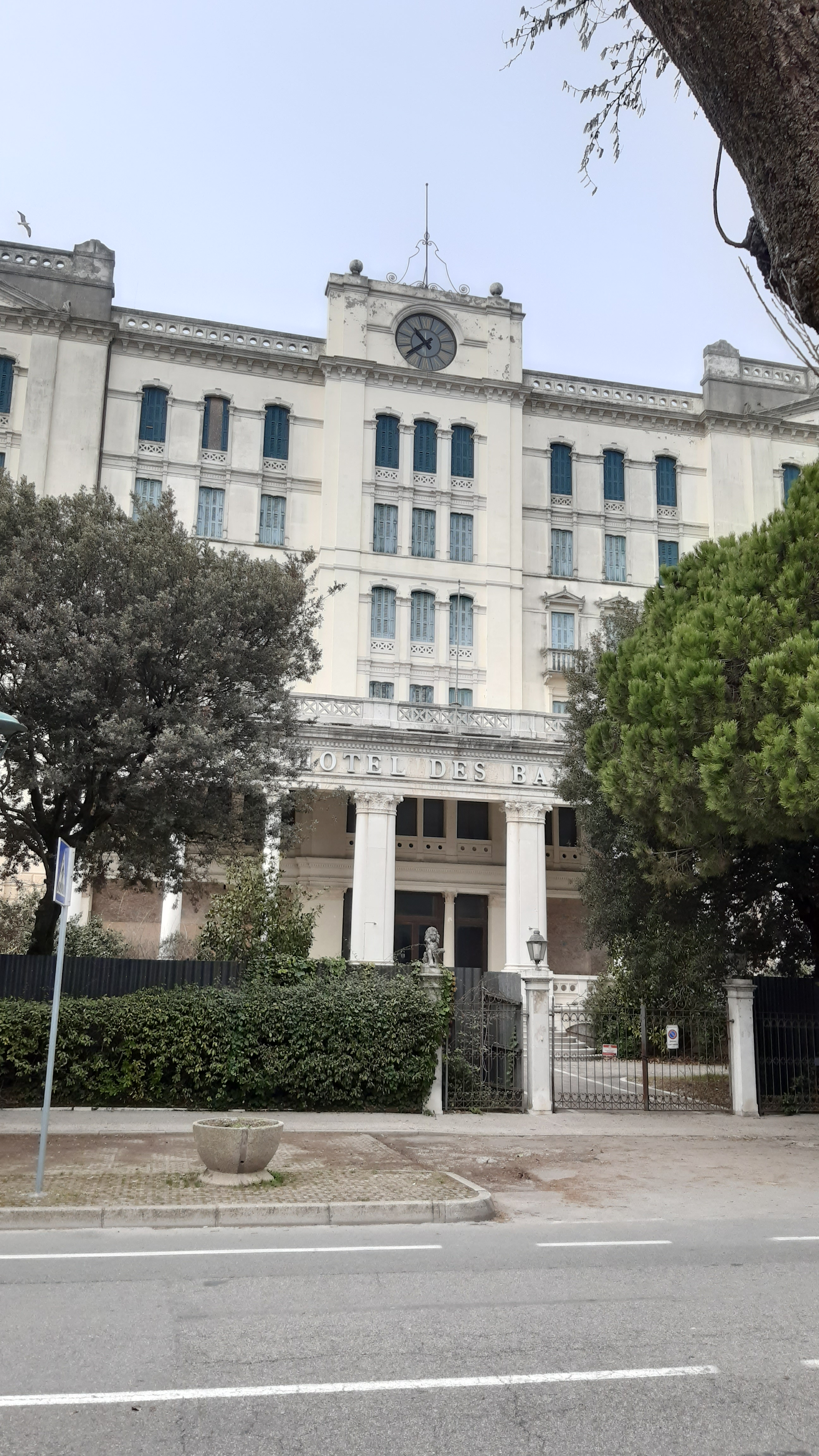
The hotel in march 2023

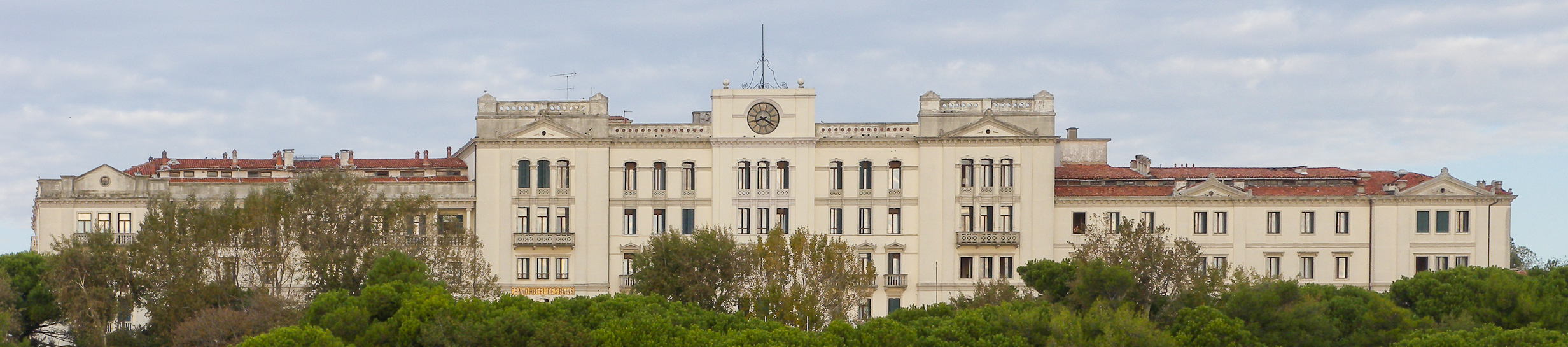
The hotel in 2009
