= Leon Kaufmann =

Polish painter and pastel artist

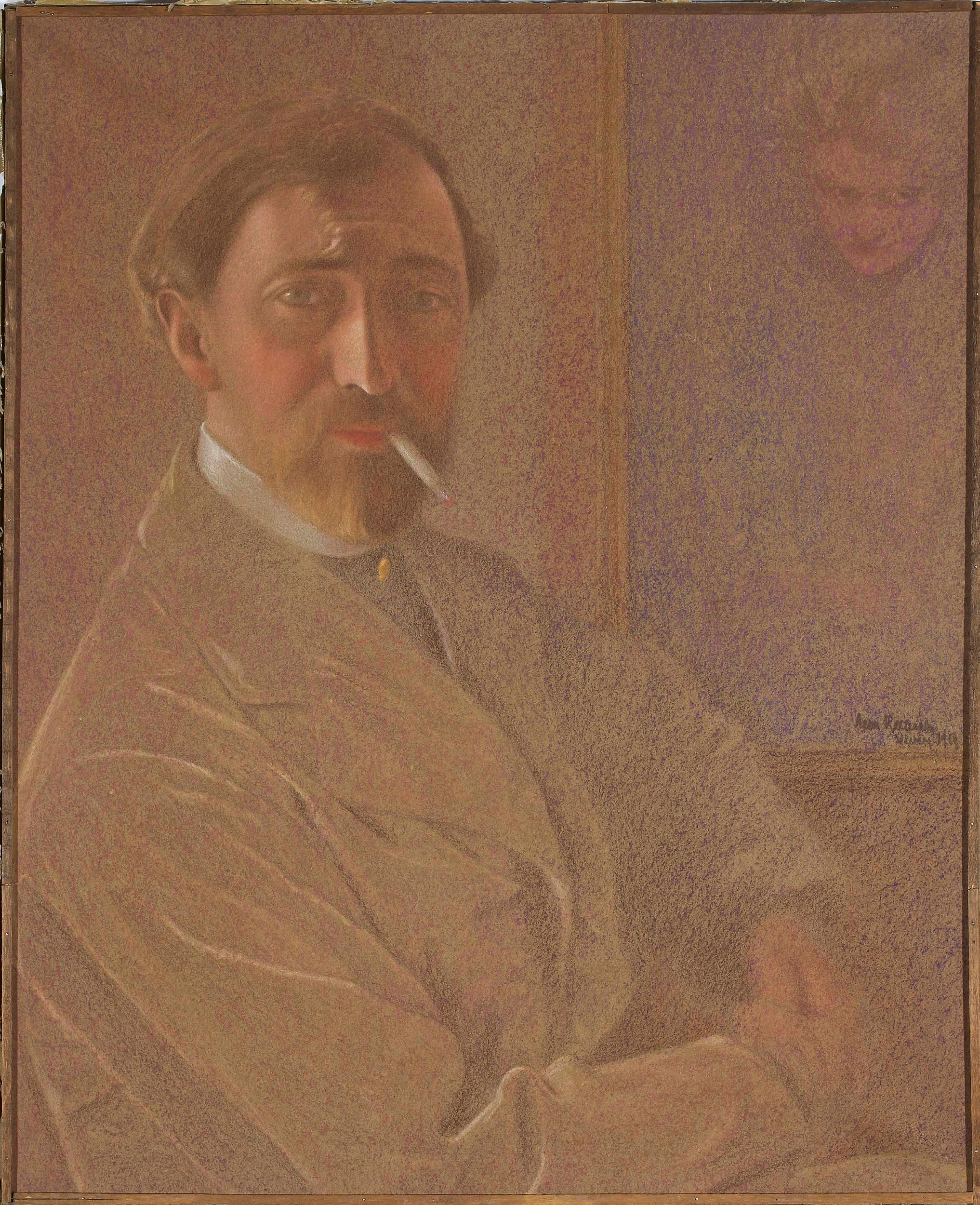
Self-portrait with Cigarette (1919)

Leon Kaufmann, in French, Léon Kamir Kaufmann, also known as Kamir or Kamir-Kaufman (8 June 1872 in Pawłowo – 27 May 1933 in Louveciennes) was a Polish painter and pastel artist who worked in France after 1902.

== Biography ==
His first art lessons were in 1888, at the School of Fine Arts in Warsaw with Wojciech Gerson. In 1895, he moved to Munich, where he studied at the Academy of Fine Arts with Simon Hollósy until 1897. The following year, he entered the Académie Julian in Paris. On that occasion, his primary instructor was Jean-Joseph Benjamin-Constant. W 1900 powrócił do Warszawy.

From 1901 to 1902, he and the literary critic Cezary Jellenta held an artistic cabaret at his studio, which was regularly attended by the author, Zofia Nałkowska and Tadeusz Ulanowski (1872-1942), a noted actor, among others. In 1902, he left for Paris and settled there permanently, but never broke off contact with his homeland, paying frequent visits to Warsaw and Vilnius, where he was the guest of the philanthropist, Eugenia Kierbedź. In 1914, he married Odette Dessauces, from a wealthy French family. They settled on an estate in Louveciennes in 1922, but he maintained his studio in Paris.

He continued to exhibit in Poland; notably with the Society for the Encouragement of the Fine Arts and in the salon of Aleksander Krywult. He also worked with the "Protection Society for Children of the Jewish Religion". In Paris, he favored the Salon d'Automne, the salon of the Société Nationale des Beaux-Arts (of which he became a member in 1911) and the Salon des Tuileries. He also held personal exhibitions and a few in other European cities, such as London, Venice and Vienna.

He painted in a variety of genres; including portraits, landscapes and interior scenes. Although he lived in France, he apparently never became involved in the various artistic schools that developed there. His pastel portraits, however, were inspired by Luminist techniques and were designed to give an impression of vagueness. Among those he portrayed were the French composers and musicians Alfred Cortot, Paul Dukas, Reynaldo Hahn and Ferruccio Busoni. His portraits of Polish notables included Wanda Landowska, Ignacy Jan Paderewski, Józef Hofmann, Stanisław Przybyszewski and Jan Rosen,

== Selected works ==
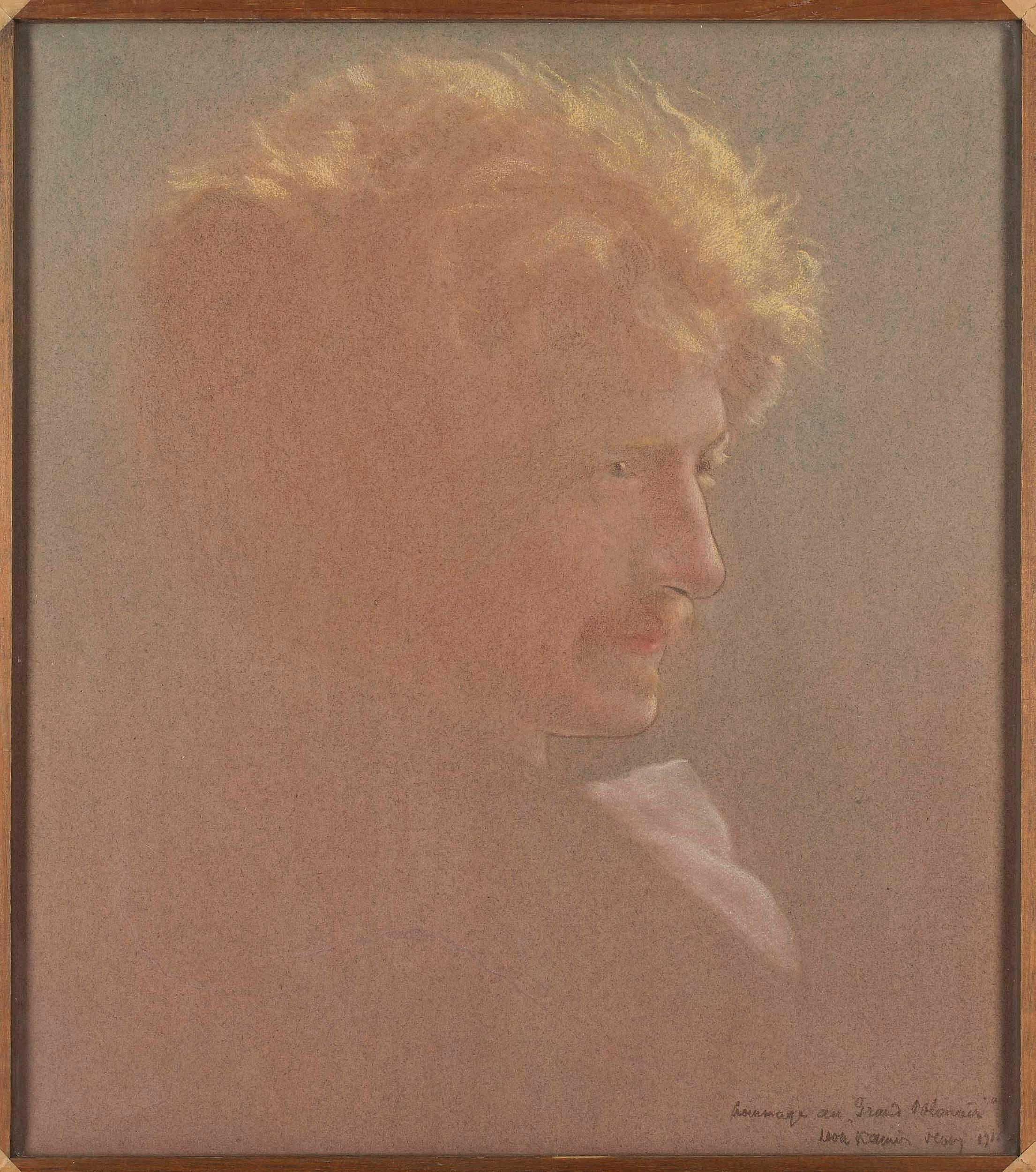
Portrait of Paderewski

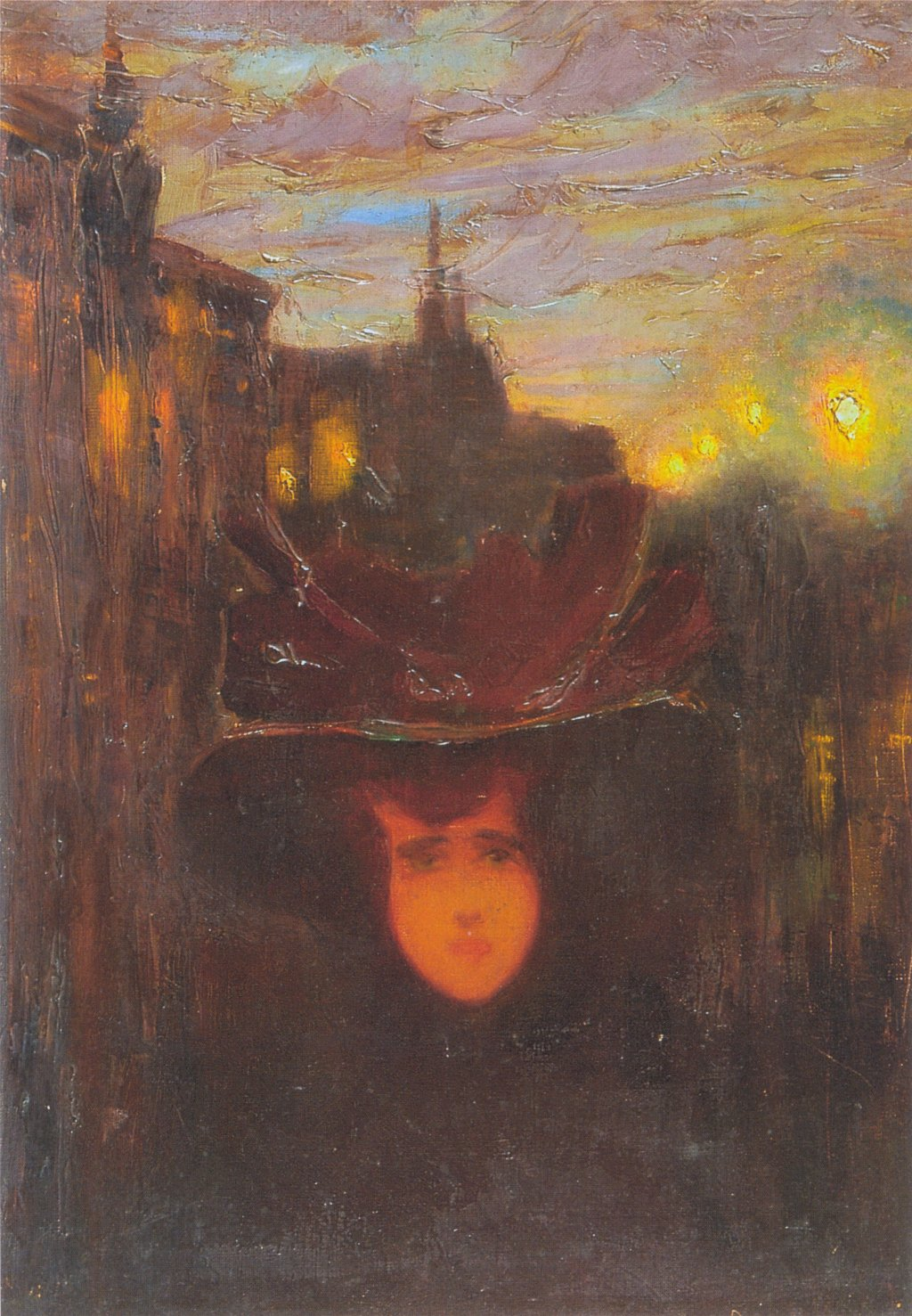
Night Bird

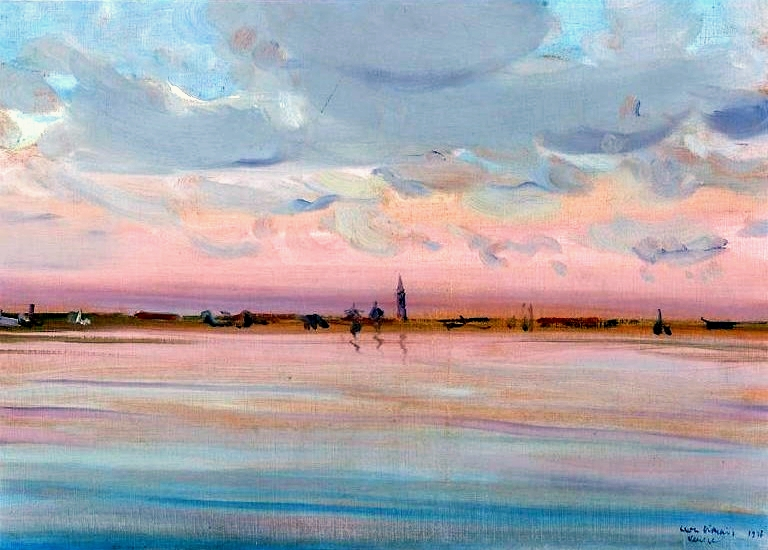
View of Lido

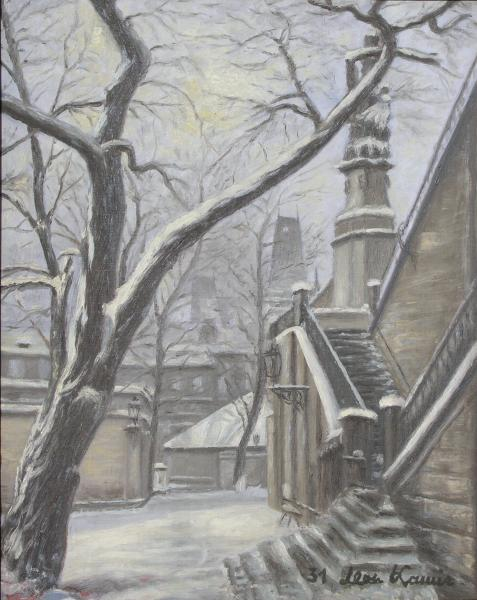
The Veranda at Malmaison

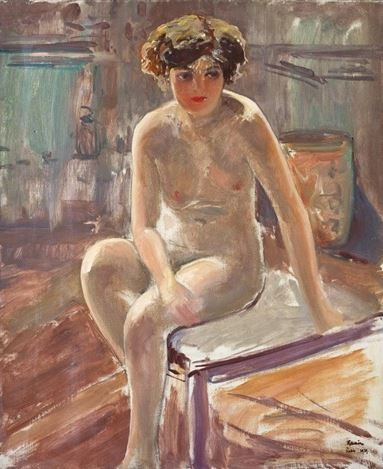
Seated Female Nude
