= Venice Lido =

Barrier island in the Venetian Lagoon in Italy

Lido di Venezia
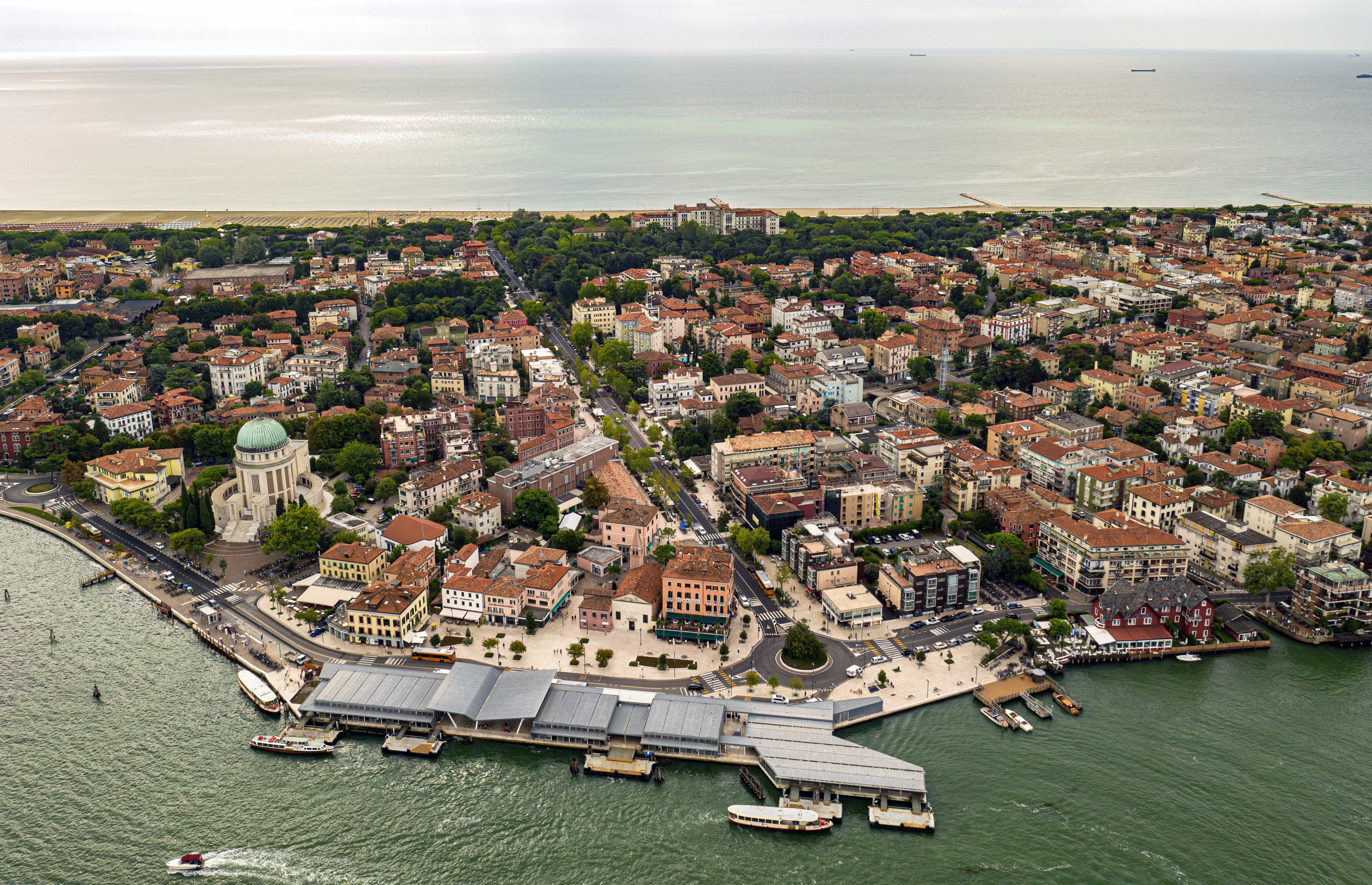

- Location in the Lagoon of Venice

Geography
- Coordinates: 45.40062°N 12.360595°E
- Adjacent to: Venetian Lagoon
- Area: 4 km^{2} (1.5 sq mi)
- Length: 11 km (6.8 mi)
- Highest elevation: 3 m (10 ft)

Administration
- Italy
- Comune: Venice

Venice Lido (Italian: Lido di Venezia), commonly Lido or the Lido, is an 11-kilometre-long (7-mile) barrier island in the Venetian Lagoon, Northern Italy; it is home to about 20,400 residents. The Venice Film Festival takes place at the Lido in late August/early September.

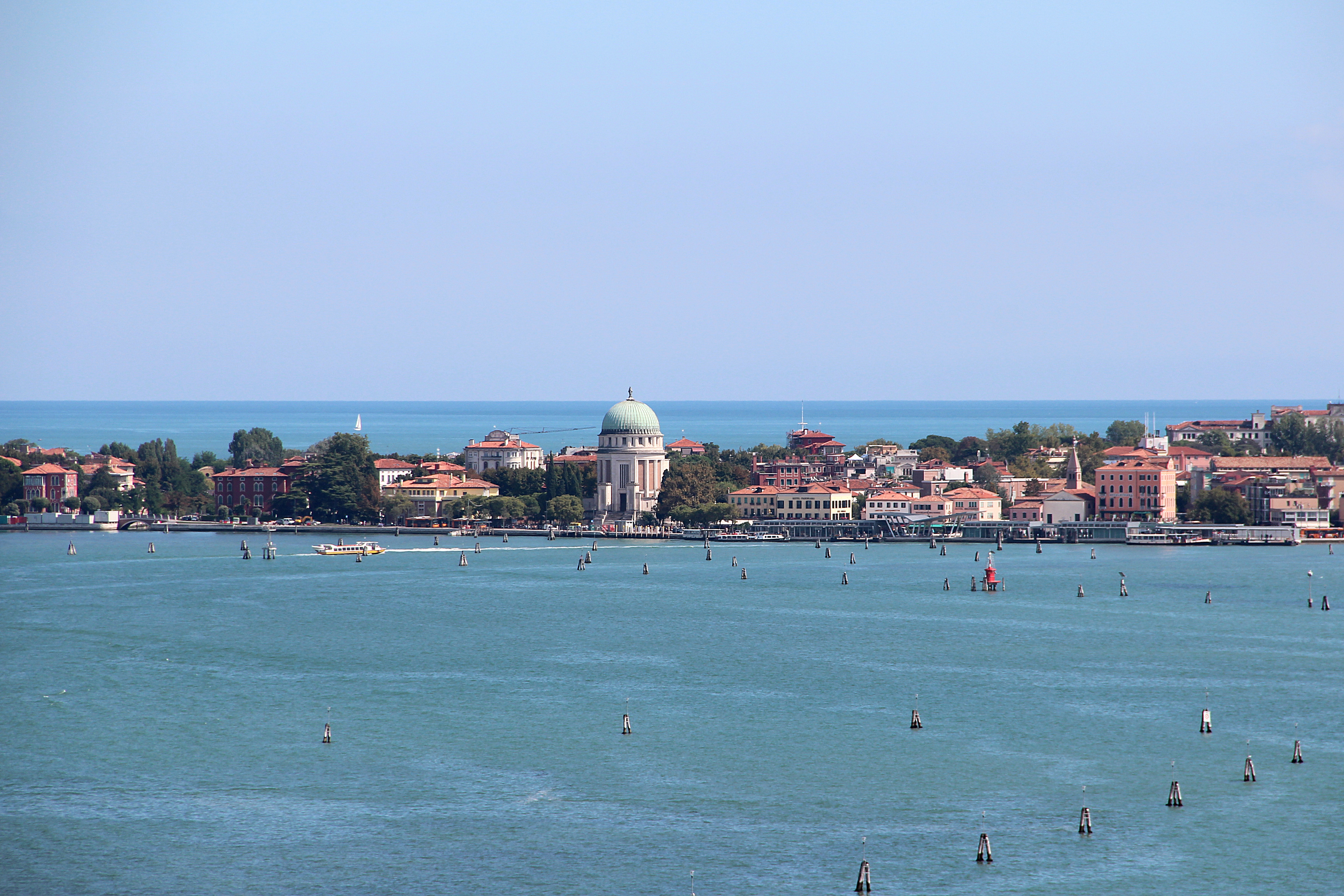
Lido Island seen from the campanile of the Basilica of San Giorgio Maggiore.

== Geography ==
The Lido island is the more northerly of the two barrier islands of the Lagoon of Venice; the other is Pellestrina. They form the central part of the coastline of the lagoon on the Adriatic Sea. The peninsula of Cavallino/Punta Sabbioni forms the northern part and the peninsula of Sottomarina forms the southern part. The sea has access to the lagoon through three inlets between the islands and between the islands and the peninsulas. At the northern end of Lido there is the Lido inlet which separates it from Cavallino/Punta Sabbioni and at the southern end there is the Malamocco inlet which separates it from Pellestrina. These two inlets have been dredged to a greater depth to allow big ships through. The Malamocco inlet is the deepest one and is used by container ships and oil tankers to reach the commercial and industrial port of Marghera. The Lido inlet is the widest one (c. 1 km or 0.6 mi) and is used by cruise ships to reach Venice.

Lido is a long and narrow island which gets wider in its northern tract. At least half the seaward coast has sandy beaches. Much of the beach at the town of Lido belongs to various hotels. There are large public beaches towards the northern and southern ends.

The island is home to a town and a village. The town is in the north. It is also called Lido (population 15,128 in 2019). It has four neighbourhoods: San Nicolò and Santa Maria Elisabetta are on the lagoon side coast (the landing stage for the Venice ferry is in the former and the one for the water bus is in the latter), while La Favorita and Quattro Fontaine are on the seaward coast. It developed in the 19th century as a tourist centre, both as a leisure seaside resort and as a balneotherapy resort. It has many 19th century villas built in Liberty style (the Italian version of Art Nouveau) and many hotels. It is famous for being the seat of the Venice Film Festival and for its grand hotels, such as the Grand Hotel des Bains, the Hotel Excelsior, and the Hotel Ausonia & Hungaria which have hosted celebrities, artists and writers, major businessmen, politicians and royalty. The Gran Viale Santa Maria Elisabetta (27 m (89 ft) wide and c. 700 m (2,300 ft) long) crosses the town from coast to coast and links the water bus landing stage to the beach.

The village of Malamocco (with a population of 1030 as of 2019) is on the lagoon side coast, in the central-southern part of the island. From the 12th century to the 19th century it was the only significant settlement on the island. It was built after the settlement of Metamaucum, which had been the second capital of the Duchy of Venetia, was submerged by a storm surge.

At the southern end of the island is Alberoni, an area of sand dunes. It has Venice's golf course and the Alberoni Dune Oasis which has one of the largest and best-preserved dune systems on the coasts of the Northern Adriatic Sea, with dunes up to 10 metres (33 ft) high, a large, c. 30-hectare (74-acre), pine forest and unique species of flora and fauna.

== History ==
=== Metamaucum ===
Metamaucum was one of the earliest settlements in the Lagoon of Venice. Its origins dated back to the Roman days. It became the second ducal seat of the duchy of Venetia (before the rise of Venice) when Teodato Ipato (742–755), the second doge, transferred it from Heraclea, to 811, when the doge Agnello Participazio (811–827) moved it to Rivoalto. It was temporarily occupied by Pepin of Italy when he tried to invade the lagoon in 810. It was destroyed by the doge Giovanni I Participazio (829–836) when he suppressed a rebellion based in Metamaucum. The settlement continued to be inhabited, but it was a shadow of its former self. Its decadence reached its peak when its priory was moved to the island of Murano (1080), the S.S. Leone e Basso nuns moved to the island of San Servolo (1109) and its diocese was moved to Chioggia between 1107 and 1110. In 1116 it was submerged as a result of an exceptional storm surge. According to the tradition, Metamaucum was on the seashore of the Lido island, rather than on its lagoon shore.

A new settlement was built on the lagoon shore of Lido, close to where Metamaucum had been. The existence of a Metamaucum Nova, which corresponds to today's Malamocco, was first attested in 1107.

=== Military island ===
Until the 19th century Lido's main role was a military one for the defence of the lagoon as it lies by the lido inlet, the widest point of entry of the lagoon and the one which is closest to Venice. It continued to have a military role until WW II. Prior to the 19th century it was also a scarcely populated island. In 1820 Lido has 814 inhabitants, 662 of whom lived in Malamocco, and 152 lived in San Nicolò.

In 600 a lookout tower was built at San Nicolò, at the northern end of Lido, on its lagoon side shore, to monitor enemy ships, particularly pirate ships, approaching the lagoon at the Lido inlet. In 1100 it was strengthened and developed into a fort under the doge Vitale I Michiel (1096-1102). This fort was later called Castel Vecchio (Old Castle).

In 1229 crossbow shooting ranges were created in areas of Venice for weekly exercises by men between the ages of 16 and 35. In 1229 a shooting range was established at San Nicolò. It hosted shooting contests at Christmas and Easter to make the exercises more interesting. Infantry, cavalry, and artillery units were also stationed in the area and foundries for armaments and munitions were built where the Jewish cemetery was later set up. In 1304 a militia was instituted. The sailing to Lido was also turned into a contest. The men rowed to the island on boats (called ganzaruoli) with 30-40 oarsmen boats which competed over who would get there first. This is the origin of the word regatta. The only establishment that sold wine at San Nicolò was closed during the contests. A lighthouse was also built close to the shooting range. A permanent garrison was set up. It served as rest area for troops which needed to briefly stop by. Wells to supply freshwater to ships that left the city were built.

In the mid-14th century tensions between Venice and the Republic of Genoa escalated due to their rivalry over supremacy of the naval routes and trading ports in the eastern Mediterranean . 1318. San Nicolò was bombed several times by a Genoese fleet.

In 1335 the Gagiandra (turtle in Venetian) was built. It was a platform for artillery which was placed in the Lido channel which went from the Lido inlet to Venice. It was broad and tapered at the stern and bow. It was covered by a metal plate which acted as a shield. The canons were sticking out of this shield. This gave it the appearance of the head, tail and legs of a turtle. The platform was placed between the Castel Vecchio (Old Castle) at San Nicolò and the Castel Novo (New Castle) on the Vignole island. These two islands and the island of Certosa formed the shores of the channel. An iron chain was placed across the channel. It was supported by the Gagiandra and two rafts placed midway between the "turtle" and the two shores. The chain was kept close to the surface of the water to prevent enemy ships to pass above it.

In 1379 Genoa attacked the lagoon in the War of Chioggia (1379–80). Two towers were built as platforms for crossbows and cannons at the Castel Vecchio and Novo forts (on the Lido and Vignole islands) on the two sides of the Lido channel, to further protect the entrance to the lagoon. Small boats which were chained together were placed between the two towers. Between them there were three ships with archers covered with fresh hides to protect them from fire. A ditch and earthen rampart strengthened with stone were created to protect the S. Nicoló abbey. Eventually Venice won the war.

In 1409 an admiralty was established at S. Nicolò. 1520 The Council of Ten build a building to house its offices and barracks for its officers who were entrusted with monitoring Lido, its fortresses, its inlet and the way the sea changed its beaches. This was called the Casa Rossa (Red House).

In the 16th century, with the Turkish conquests in south-eastern Europe and the eastern Mediterranean, which were a threat to the Venetian dominion in that part of the Mediterranean the Turks were also considered a threat to Venice itself.

Between 1543 and 1549 Castel Novo, on the Vignole island, was developed into the Sant’Andrea fort. Between 1546 and 1574 Castel Novo at San Nicolò was developed into the San Nicolò fort. Between 1569 and 1574 the latter was strengthened with a triple ditch. Artillery was placed on the seaward side. There were no batteries on the lagoon side in case the fortress was seized and the cannons would be used against the Sant’Andrea fort. The fort became a complex with the military headquarters of the Republic of Venice. The whole area became a c. 521 m long (1,709 ft) fortified citadel stretching along the lagoon coast with brick barriers and bastions, a dike and an earthen fore wall. It was later extended towards the sea with angular barriers, six gates and underground exits on the sea beach side, towards the entrance to the Lido inlet. Inside the new fortification there were the old San Nicolò church and its convent and the adjacent Palazzo dei dieci/Casa Rossa at the back. In 1572 an Istrian stone bridge that looked like a triumphal arch over the dock was built to provide access to the citadel.

Large barracks for the troops, known as Saraglio, Quartier Grando or Palazzo dei Soldati (Stronghold, Large Quarters or Building of the Soldiers) were built between 1591 and 1594. It was an imposing building which provided lodgings for 2000 soldiers. It was the first true barracks in Europe, the first instance in which troops were lodged in peacetime. It was an important step towards the creation of a modern army as opposed to a mercenary army or a militia. It was built on the location where the crusaders had gathered before setting off for the fourth crusade. From 1600 the barracks hosted the Fanti da Mar (Infantrymen of the Sea), the first amphibian troops in history, a sort of precursor of today's marines.

In 1571 it was decided to build octagonal forts for artillery batteries on islets off the lagoon side shore of Lido. They were the Ottagono Campana (later called Abbandonato, abandoned octagon), between Malamocco and Alberoni (off the southern end of the Lido island) and the Ottagono Alberoni, by Alberoni and the northern end of the Malamocco inlet, the other point of access into the lagoon, where ships could turn towards Venice. The Ottagono di Poveglia (further north, on the Poveglia island, off Malamocco) acted as a reinforcement for the other two octagons further south. Two octagons were built off the Pellestrina island, the Ottagono San Pietro, at the northern end of the island and the southern end of the Malamocco inlet and the Ottagono Caroman, at the southern end of Pellestrina to guard the Chioggia inlet, the third entry point of the lagoon. In 1572, 75 artillery were supplied for the San Nicolò fort and 56 for Sant’Andrea.

San Nicolò was also where the soldiers and the ships for Venice's naval expeditions in the Adriatic Sea and the rest of the Mediterranean Sea gathered and set off from. Some of these were:

In 1000 the doge Pietro II Orseolo (991-1009) set off for a mission to Istria and Dalmatia which freed the northern Adriatic from the Narentine pirates. In 1099, 207 ships set off at the end of the first crusade to help the crusaders to consolidate their conquests. It defeated a fleet of their Genoese rivals off Rhodes. In 1124 a fleet sets off to free the King of Jerusalem who had been imprisoned in Tyre, Lebanon. It had 108 vessels, 40 galleys 40 supply ships and 28 ships with rams. It besieged and seized Tyre. In 1171 A fleet set off for a battle against the emperor Byzantine Emmanuel Kommenos who had the Venetians in Constantinople arrested. The fleet was defeated more by the plague that the Byzantines, who were joined by the rival maritime republics of Genoa and Pisa. In 1202 the crusaders of the fourth crusade gathered at Lido in preparation to be taken to the East by Venetian ships. In 1690 Francesco Morosini set off for a campaign in the Peloponnese. He was elected as doge while away. He was met at Lido by the abbot while the senators waited for him of the bucintoro, the ceremonial boat of the doge. In 1784 there was a punitive expedition against the Barbary pirates.

=== Pope, emperor and the Peace of Venice ===
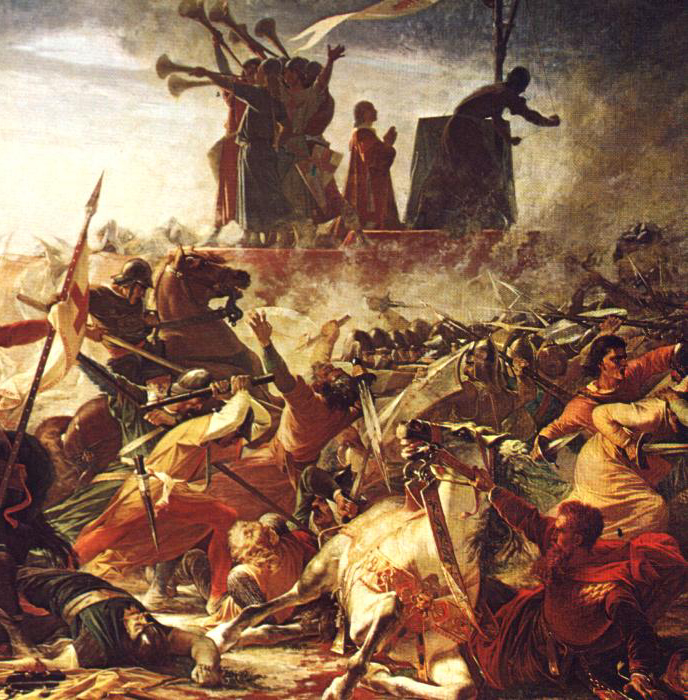
The defence of the Carroccio during the battle of Legnano (1176) by Amos Cassioli (1832–1891)

The emperor Frederick I, Barbarossa (reigned 1155–1190) conducted six military campaigns in Italy, which was under his Holy Roman Empire. Originally he wanted to confront the Norman Kingdom of Sicily in the south. However, his intervention in Italy was opposed by several Italian cities, particularly Milan, which he had partially destroyed during his second campaign. A dispute with Pope Alexander III (1159–1181) developed because Frederick endorsed antipope Victor IV, who had been elected in opposition to Alexander. Opposition against Frederick in northern Italy grew and the Lombard League, a league formed by several cities, fought him. Frederick was defeated at the Battle of Legnano in 1176. Preliminary peace negotiations took place at Anagni (the Peace of Anagni) in 1176. Negotiations involving all the concerned parties to reach a formal peace treaty took place in Venice where a conference was scheduled for July 1177. The doge Sebastiano Ziani (1172–1178) was to act as an intermediary.

The pope arrived in Venice on 10 May 1177. Negotiations with the Lombard League and the king of Sicily started but they were taking a hard stance. Frederick was not allowed to go to Venice and waited for news in Ravenna. A pro-Frederick faction in Venice encouraged Frederick to come to Venice in defiance of the veto, but the emperor declined to do so without the doge's approval. Because of internal pressure, Ziani hesitated. The envoys of the League left Venice for Treviso in protest. The head of the Sicilian delegation threatened to leave and said that his king would take revenge on Venice breach of faith. This would have meant retaliation against Venetian traders in Sicily. The doge confirmed that Frederick would be allowed to enter Venice only after this received papal approval.

This situation highlighted the danger of a breakdown in the talks and negotiations proceeded more rapidly. On 23 July the agreement was completed. At the pope request, Venetian ships went to Chioggia to pick up the emperor, who was taken to Lido. Four cardinals went there to meet him there. Frederick recognised Alexander as the rightful pope and could now be allowed to enter Venice. Doge Ziani went to meet him at San Nicolò and took him to Venice with great pomp. A ceremony was held at St. Mark's basilica.

=== The Wedding to the Sea ===
In 1000 the doge Pietro II Orseolo (991–1009) set off for a mission to Istria and Dalmatia which freed the northern Adriatic from the Narentine pirates. Istria and Dalmatia accepted Venice's suzerainty. To celebrate this the Venetians celebrated with the Benedictio del Mare (Blessing of the Sea) ceremony, which was held annually until 1177. In that year, after Venice's mediation which led to the Peace of Venice, it was replaced by the Sposalizio col Mare (Wedding with the Sea).

In this ceremony the doge sailed for Lido on the bucintoro (the doge's ceremonial ship) with the top clergy, the top officials of the Republic of Venice and ambassadors. This was followed by a large number of Venetians on various kinds of vessels. It was a festive parade. Between Lido and the Sant'Andrea fort (see above), where the Lagoon of Venice meets the Adriatic Sea, the doge took a golden ring which pope Alexander III had donated him. He then threw it into the sea. It was attached to a string so that it can be retrieved. The doge then recited "We marry thee, oh sea, in a sign of eternal domination." The ceremony ended in 1797 when the Republic fell with its conquest by Napoleon. It was performed on the first Sunday after Ascension Day.

The ceremony and fête was performed again in 1965 and in 1988. The latter was an initiative by private citizens and cultural and sport associations which wanted to relaunch the celebrations. The ceremony became permanent and is now led by the mayor of Venice

The ceremony was also associated with the Feast of the Ascension. In 1180 it developed into the Fiera della Sensa (Fair of the Ascension). There were acrobats, jugglers and minstrels in all the streets of Venice. There was a large market in St. Mark's Square. From 1307 the market had especially prepared stands which over time became increasingly decoratively elaborate. Goods of all kinds and from all over the world were displayed.

=== Murazzi ===
The engineer Bernardo Zendrini found that pozzolana mixed with chalk and sand was an efficient water-resistant binder. In 1737 he built a 2.5 m long (8 ft 2 in) test wall near Malamocco. Three years later it had withstood two winter storm surges (one of which had been one of the worst) without damage. This led to the building of the murazzi, imposing walls made with large blocks of Istrian stone to form a continuous sea defence on the barrier island of Pellestrina. Later murazzi were built at Lido as well, but here they were discontinuous. A previously unknown 350 m long (1,150 ft) test wall was brought to light by the seaward shore in 1980. It lies 380 m (1,250 ft) from the sea. This is because after the construction of the breakwater at San Nicolò (see below), sand has been accumulating on the sea shore in the northern part of the island, widening the beach.

=== Churches, monasteries convents and saints ===
In 887 the male Benedictine monastery of San Cipriano was founded in Malamocco on the initiative of doge Giovanni II Participazio. This was followed by the female monastery of Santi Leone and Basso. In 1108 San Cipriano was abandoned due to damage caused by the sea and daily ground collapses. The friars moved to the Murano island and set up a new monastery of S. Cipriano. In 1109, for the same reason, the nuns moved to a convent on the San Servolo island vacated by Benedictine monks who had moved to the monastery of Sant'Ilario near Fusina.

In 1045 the doge Domenico Contarini I (1043–1071), the Patriarch of Grado and the bishop of Olivolo founded the church and convent of San Nicolò. The works for the church were completed in 1064. In 1053, the management of the church and convent was handed to the abbot of the Benedictine monastery of San Giorgio Maggiore. In 1098 some of relics three of saints from Myra (now Demre), west of the Chelidonia cape, Lydia, on the southern coast of what is now Turkey, were smuggled by a naval squadron which returned form the first crusade and placed in the San Nicolò church. The saints were Nicolò Major, his uncle Nicolò Minor and Theodoros. The church, which was small, was enlarged in 1134 and urns with the relics were moved from the crypt and put in three niches by the main altar. Between 1626 and 1634 the church was demolished and rebuilt, together with the bell tower, using material from the old church. In 1770 the Benedictines moved to San Giorgio Maggiore island because a 1768 law closed confraternities with fewer than 12 monks or friars. The building became a military quarter. The church remained open for worship. In 1938 it was granted to Franciscan friars.

The first record of the Abbey of San Leonardo between Alberoni and Malamocco dates to 1111. It was destroyed by fire, along with the whole of the Malamocco coast, during the War of Chioggia (1379–80). In 1407 there was a bequest for the rebuilding of the monastery. The church was rebuilt with funds from the patriarch of Venice. The church merged with the San Camillo hospital in 1928 and was demolished to enlarge the hospital.

In 1557 the parish church of Santa Maria Assunta church in Malamocco was rebuilt on top of old one, which dated to the 11th century.

In 1620 there was a request to build a church at Lido to replace the unauthorised oratory of Beata Vergine Visitante Santa Elisabetta (Blessed Visiting Virgin St. Elizabeth) to the south of San Nicolò, which was built by the locals because they found it difficult to reach their parish church of San Pietro di Castello on the island with the same name. In 1627 the construction of the new church, now called Santa Maria Elisabetta, on top of the old oratory was completed. The patriarch of Venice granted it the title of parish church. It was the second parish church of Lido, after Santa Maria Assunta in Malamocco. In the 19th century, when the area became built up, it was named after this church.

=== Jewish and Protestant cemeteries ===
In 1386 the Jews were granted a plot of uncultivated land to develop the Jewish cemetery. The friars of the San Nicolò convent were opposed to this and claimed that they owned the land. A few years later to resolve this, the Jews paid a token rent. Consent was given and burials started in 1389. A Protestant cemetery was opened close to the Jewish one in 1674. A very small Catholic cemetery was opened in 1866 in front of the entrance of the Jewish one. In 1916 it was replaced by a new one. A new Jewish cemetery was also built. Its monumental entrance was completed in 1923. As a result, the Catholic cemetery lies between the old and new Jewish cemeteries.

=== 19th century ===
The accumulation of sand carried by the sea at the Malamocco and Lido inlets made their navigability problematic. During second Napoleonic occupation (1806–1814), it was decided to build breakwaters on the southern and northern shore of the Malamocco inlet. The latter was to be built at Alberoni, on the southern tip of Lido. However, the works were not completed due to the second Austrian occupation (1814–1848). The Austrians disagreed with the French plans. The project was entrusted to the engineer Pietro Paleocapa. Works at Alberoni started in 1838 and were completed in 1845. Works on the southern breakwater at Santa Maria del Mare, on the Pellestrina island, started in 1853 and were completed in 1856. The object of the northern breakwater to keep the coastal current at bay and trap the sand it carried. That of the southern one was to channel the receding low tide water to make the inlet deeper through the force of the exit current.

In the late 18th century and in the 19th century, a number of poets and writers wrote about Lido. This made Lido an attractive destination for people from the European elites in their then fashionable journeys in Italy. In 1786 Johann Wolfgang von Goethe, the German poet and scientist, visited Lido and wrote about his experience there in this book about his journey in Italy. Lord Byron spent five years (1816–1821) in Venice and liked to ride his horses at Lido from a hut he rented at Alberoni. In 1818 he was visited by Percy Bysshe Shelley. The two spent a couple of days at Lido. Shelley wrote a poem about this. Since Byron was a celebrity, this attracted tourists who hoped to meet the poet or get a glimpse of him at Lido. In 1830 James Fenimore Cooper, the author of The Last of the Mohicans, visited and described Lido and used Venice as the background for his novel The Bravo. In 1841 John Ruskin, the art critic who wrote about Venice and her art, also wrote about Lido. Other people who visited Lido and described it were and the French poet Theophile Gautier, in 1850, Herman Melville, the American novelist and poet, in 1857, and Hyppolyte Taine, the French critic and historian, in 1864. Henry James first arrived in Venice in 1869. He went to Lido 14 times. He wrote about Venice in some of his novels and one of them was set in Venice. The British poet and playwright Robert Browning went to Lido in 1888 and died in Venice nearly two months later.

Frederick William, the Duke of Brunswick (1771–1815) bought a plot of land at Lido, intending it to have his holiday home there. From 1879 queen Margherita of Savoy took her sickly son Victor Emmanuel III, the heir to the throne of the Kingdom of Italy on holiday at Lido, at the sea bathing facility of La Favorita. A royal chalet was arranged for her. In those days there was the belief that sea bathing had a curative or therapeutic value.

Tommaso Rima, a doctor at Venice's hospital, believed that bathing in the lagoon had therapeutic benefits for nervous illnesses, scrofula, rickets and skin disorders. In 1833 he set up a floating bathing facility at Punta della Dogana, opposite St Mark's. It consisted of two big rafts which created a pool with a grate at the bottom and which could be reassembled in the summer. There was a café and one could sunbathe. The idea of bathing therapy caught on. Gondolas were adapted for the purpose and inns set up pools with water drawn for the nearby canals which was warmed up. There was an idea that this kind of bathing in the Venetian winter was particularly therapeutic. In 1857 a booklet about this notion published.

The Lido's potential for tourism did not go unnoticed. In 1852 there was a proposal to set up two spas, one on the lagoon shore and one on the sea shore, but it was then thought that the lagoon water was less pure. In 1855 De la Hante, a Frenchman, set up a bathing resort in the La Favorita area, which was named after the villa of the archduke Maximillian of Austria (1832–1867) the brother of the emperor who was in charge of the Austrian dominions in northern Italy (1815–1859) and spent some of his time in Venice. The resort had 70 rooms. In 1872 De la Hante bought the archduke's villa to convert it into a restaurant, café, casino and 70 rooms for an exclusive beach resort. However, he then sold it to the Lido Bathing Resort Society (see below).

In 1857 Giovanni Busetto, nicknamed Fisola, also opened a seaside resort. This consisted of wooden cabins on pilings over the beach with a common central area and two wings with 15 small rooms each. Separate cabins for the lower classes were planned. It was demolished by the Austrians in 1859 due to the Second Italian War of Independence against Austrian domination in northern Italy. In 1867, after Venice became part of Italy, the resort was reopened and expanded but was destroyed by a storm surge. It was reopened and expanded again in 1870. From 1867 to 1871 the number of bathers increased from 30 to 60 thousand.

In 1857 a summer shuttle service to and from Venice was set up. It consisted of large boats with four oarsmen which could carry 16 passengers. In 1858 the road from the church of Santa Maria Elisabetta, which was by the landing stage in the lagoon coast and lead to the seacoast, was widened and made suitable for vehicle traffic. It eventually came to be called Gran Viale Santa Maria Elisabetta (or just Gran Viale). It was widened again in 1888 and a horse-drawn omnibus which took tourists to the beach along the Gran Viale entered into service. In the same year the military steamship Alnoch, which could carry up to 200 passengers, was made available for linking Lido with Venice during the tourist season from 6 am to 9 pm. This was then extended to 4 am to 11 pm.

In 1872 a group of entrepreneurs set up the Società Civile dei Bagni di Lido (the Lido Bathing Resort Society). Its aim was to boost Lido's tourism potential. It bought the La Favorita villa, it reduced the number of its room to six to be used by queen Margaret. A large terrace which overlooked the sea was built. It could host 1500 people and had salons, café-restaurants, reading rooms and ballrooms, a telegraph and post office, medical assistance, a chemist and life guards with special lookout posts and boats. The group also wanted to promote sea bathing as a leisure activity as well as a therapeutic one. This idea was expounded by Paolo Mantegazza, a doctor who wrote about beaches and the sea as collective salons where people could rest and have fun.

The group planned more resorts and the urban development of the area between the landing stage of the lagoon side and the sea beach. This area came to be called Santa Maria Elisabetta. The project involved substantial land improvements and drainage on an island which was still largely rural and had areas of bog land and scattered dunes. A water drainage and sewer system was developed. The development was to have hospitality and entertainment facilities, residential areas, roads, gardens, woods, restaurants and cafes. Villas for wealthy bathers were built in Liberty style, the Italian version of Art Nouveau. The number of bathers increased from 60,000 in 1871 to 80,000 in 1872 to 160,000 in 1883.The number of small rooms for bathers increased to 600. They were equipped with facilities for seawater therapy with the spraying of rarefied water with compressed air.

In 1873 a steam navigation company was established. This was the birth of the Venetian waterbus, the service for the transport of people around the lagoon. It used steamboats which were smaller than the military one which had been used and thus allowed more frequent journeys. With regard to Lido, compared to oar boats, it shortened the time needed to reach Santa Maria Elisabetta from San Zaccaria (near St Mark's Square) dramatically, from one hour to ten minutes. In 1881 a regular time table with services every half an hour between 6 am and 12 pm was introduced. It entered into operation in 1882. In 1898 the Municipality of Venice took over the Grand Viale Santa Maria Elisabetta and widened it to 17 m (56 ft) to allow for a single-track horse-drawn tramway. The Bathing Resort Society was given permission to set this up in 1889 s up. It replaced the omnibus.

In 1885 a low-cost bathing resort for the lower classes with 150 small rooms was established. In 1887 and 1888 the bathing resort was expanded again and an electricity power plant was built. The first beach huts were installed for bathing and for "air, sunlight and sand" therapy, which was popular among families. This development required the construction of a seafront boulevard. Further urbanisation took place and more villas were built. In 1889 an electric tramway line along the Gran Viale was introduced and from 1892 the Gran Viale had electric lighting during the tourist season. The number of tourists increased from 80,000 in 1872 to 160,000 in 1883.

The Ospizio Marino (Sea Nursing Home) opened in 1870. It was a hospital for poor children who suffered from scrofulosis, which affected especially children form deprived backgrounds, who needed heliotherapy. Experiments conducted in 1842 indicated that what was then called sea therapy was the required treatment. The hospital had 200 beds. It was expanded to 500 beds in 1873. After the opening of the Excelsior Hotel in 1908 it was planned to move the hospital elsewhere to make room next to the hotel and to move the sick away from it. This occurred in the 1920s.

The Lido inlet had not been used for navigation since 1724 because it was prevented by frequent sand accumulation. In 1866 the engineer Pietro Paleocapa submitted a plan to build two breakwaters to reopen the inlet, one on its northern shore (Punta Sabbioni) and the other on its southern shore (San Nicolò). They were to be 3.5 and 2.85 km (2.17 and 1.77 mi) long respectively, extend in the direction of the Scirocco wind, give the inlet a width of 1 km (0.6 mi) and reach a depth of 8 m (26 ft). In 1870 studies showed that similar works on the Malamocco inlet had been effective in preventing sand accumulation and that the sand was stopped by the northern breakwater. It accumulated by it. The project was approved in 1871. The works started in 1882. The San Nicolò breakwater was the first that was built. The works on both was completed in 1910 with the construction of a 26 m high (85 ft) lighthouse at Punta Sabbioni.

A theatre (Nuovo Teatro del Lido) with 600 seats opened in 1892. A velodrome was opened in 1894, but cycling competitions were ended in 1896 due to high running costs. In 1911 it hosted a period costume equestrian tournament which attracted a big crowd.

=== 20th century ===
The expansion of the bathing resorts and of the urbanisation of the Santa Maria Elisabetta area continued. From 1900 to 1920 some 50 villas were built. In 1904 a horse-riding school was established. Over the decades it held several international contests and two world cups. The planning for a boulevard to connect Piazzale Santa Maria Elisabetta to San Nicolò started in 1905. An aquarium was opened next to the theatre in 1909. Both were later demolished.

Lido also became an island of grand hotels. The Grand Hotel Lido, in Piazzale Santa Maria Elisabetta, the square in front of the landing stage, was opened in 1900. It was demolished in the 1970s. In the same year the famous Grand Hotel des Bains was opened. The Hungaria Palace Hotel, later called Grand Hotel Ausonia & Hungaria, opened in 1907. It had 82 rooms furnished by Eugenio Quarti, a famous Milan furniture maker nicknamed prince of the ebanisti (carpenters who work with ebony). A maiolica mosaic with Renaissance motifs interpreted in liberty style which made the hotel very distinctive was installed on its facade between 1914 and 1916. The Hotel Palace Excelsior opened in 1908.

In 1905 Gran Viale Santa Maria Elisabetta was widened again, to 27 m (89 ft), to accommodate two tracks for an electric tramway.

In 1911, in an era when flying was new, a show of short flights which landed on the beach of the Hotel Excelsior was organised. Two flights from Venice to this beach were arranged later in the year. The last one attracted many people who paid tickets to get on the terrace of the hotel and crowded it. There was a lottery draw whose prize was a tour on the plane. More such flights were then organised. This helped to attract attention to the hotel. In 1914 the owner of the Excelsior opened a fun fair which was extremely successful. However, it was dismantled the next year because of WW I. Another one was opened in 1932 but it suffered the same fate because of WW II.

In 1919 work started on a staircase to a votive temple (built between 1925 and 1928) dedicated to the Madonna of Victory and built for the remembrance of the fallen soldiers of WW I. The bodies of 3700 soldiers are kept here.

In the 1920s seaplanes became the next technological advance. A Frenchman organised an international competition, the Schneider International Cup, from 1920 to 1931. It was held at Lido in 1920, 1921 and 1927. It was extremely popular.

In 1919 it was decided that the Ospizio Marino (see above) was to remain open permanently and not just in the summer. Between 1922 and 1926 a new site for the hospital was built in the La Favorita area. It was now opened to adults as well. The centre for rehabilitation for children with rickets merged with this hospital in 1924. The Ospizio developed balneotherapy (bathing therapy) psammotherapy (hot sand baths) and sun therapy. In 1933 it was renamed Ospedale al Mare (Hospital at the Sea). It became a hospital of specialised excellence and the foremost thalassotherapy (the use of seawater for therapy) centre in Italy. In 1933 a church was opened in this complex.

In 1920 the Grand Hotel Company (CIGA) built a bagno popolare (low-cost bathing resort) and gave the municipality a large square to create a public playground. In 1923 another bagno popolare (later called zone A) was established next to the Ospizio Marino.

The Nicelli airport was developed during WWI for the defence of Venice. In 1926 it was converted to civilian use with the construction of a terminal. The first light was to Vienna and carried four passengers. By 1931 there were six routes. In 1935 a second terminal was built. By 1939 there were 23,285 passengers. The major European airlines operated here and the airport was the second most important one in Italy after Rome. During WW II much of its equipment was confiscated by the Germans, who also tried to destroy it. Operations resumed after the war. However, with the advent of bigger jet planes, the runway became too short. In 1961 the new Venice Marco Polo Airport was opened. The Nicelli airport only handled small private planes and hosted a school for pilots and parachutists. In 1994 the municipality of Venice set up a management firm to the restore the airport and relaunch economic activity in the area.

In 1930 the golf course at Alberoni was inaugurated. It was said that Henry Ford had been disappointed that Lido did not have a golf course. The area at the southern end of the island, which had sand dunes (sand would provide good drainage), trees and a former military fort and stables was chosen. Originally it had 9 holes. It was extended to 18 holes in 1951. The course is 6 km (3.7 mi) long. It hosted Italian opens in 1955, 1960 and 1974.

On 15–16 June 1934 Hitler went to Venice to meet Mussolini. He stayed at the Grand Hotel in Venice and Mussolini stayed at the Grand Hotel Excelsior. The two men met at the golf club at Alberoni.

Venice was the first city in the world to have a publicly owned and regulated casino. It opened in 1638. However, it was closed in 1774. In 1938 the casino (Palazzo del Casinò) at Lido was opened. This marked the return of legal gambling in Venice. It became a summer casino in 1946, when a winter venue was opened in Venice in what is now Ca’ Vendramin Calergi, formerly the last residence of Richard Wagner, who died there. The Palazzo del Casinò at Lido was closed in the 1990s when a new casino was opened at Ca’ Noghera in the mainland.

In 1946 and 1947 a motor race was held at the Lido circuit to relaunch tourism. Tazio Nuvolari came third in the second race. Lido hosted the road cycling world championship in 1952 and track cycling world championship in 1962. In the latter year the ice rink was opened. Prior to that the rich skated at an inner terrace of the Excelsior Hotel and the non-rich skated at a small garden by the casino.

In the 1960s, the improving post-war Italian economy created a real-estate boom in the island and many Venetians moved to Lido to benefit from its modern infrastructure.

=== 21st century ===
In 2014, aviator Francesco Fornabaio was killed in a plane crash at the "Fly Venice" air show at Lido di Venezia.

== Venice Film Festival ==
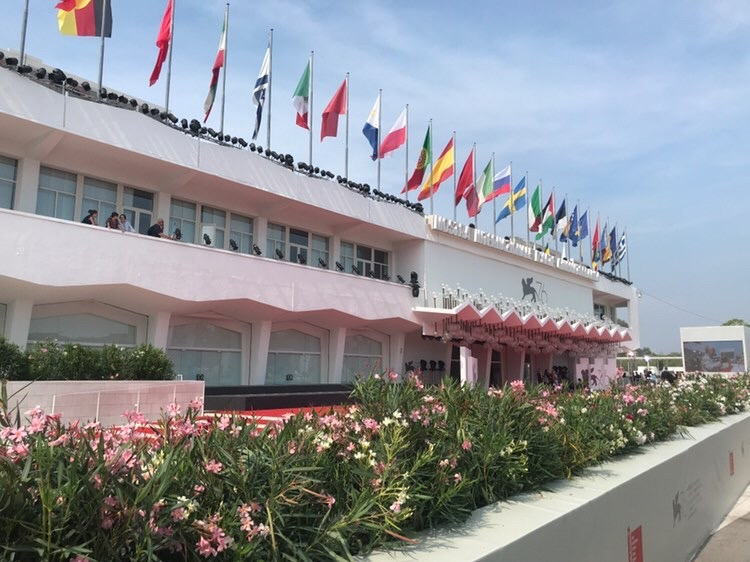
76th Venice Film Festival on the Lido.

Lido di Venezia is home to the Venice International Film Festival (Italian: Mostra Internazionale d'Arte Cinematografica della Biennale di Venezia, "International Exhibition of Cinematographic Art of the Venice Biennale"). It is the world's oldest film festival and one of the three most prestigious ones, together with the Cannes Film Festival and Berlin International Film Festival. These are sometimes called the "Big Three".

The film festival started in 1932. It was the idea of the then chair of the Venice Biennale who was worried about a decline in tourism at Lido due to the Wall Street Crash of 1929 and understood that cinema could help to alleviate this. It was successful. The prince Umberto di Savoia, Winston Churchill, Henry Ford and film stars such as Greta Garbo and Clark Gable attended. Forty films from six countries were shown on the terrace of the Excelsior hotel. No awards were given, but an audience referendum chose which films and performances were the most praiseworthy.

The second festival was held in 1934. It was meant to be a biennial event but it became annual because of the success of the first one. There were some 20 awards, but there was no jury. Premieres were shown, which increased the prestige of the festival. So did a scandal caused by a Gustav Machaty's Ecstasy which showed scenes with a female nude, at a time when this was considered scandalous, which also launched the career of the actress Hedy Lammarr. This time the films were shown in the garden of the Excelsior hotel. In 1937 the venue of the festival was opened. It is the Palazzo del Cinema.

In 1939 the Fascist government imposed the assignation of the awards to two propaganda films, a fascist one and a Nazi one. Because of this the Americans boycotted the 1940 festival. The 1940, 1941 and 1942 editions are not listed as part of the festival because the government assumed total control of the screening of films and chose films from the Rome–Berlin axis. These festival were screened at two cinemas in Venice because the film hall was requisitioned. From 1943 to 1945 the festival was suspended because of the war. It resumed in 1946. However, the French wanted their new festival, the Cannes Film Festival, to start at the same time as the Venice one. After negotiations it was decided that Cannes would run in the spring and Venice would start later, in late August. In 1946 and 1947 the festival was held in Venice because the film hall was requisitioned, this time by the American army. In the latter year the screenings took place at the Doge's Palace. The festival returned to the Lido in 1948. An arena for outdoors screenings was built outside the film hall. In 1949 the festival's award, which was called International Great Prize of Venice, was renamed St. Mark's Lion Prize. Later it was called the Golden Lion.

The Lido has also hosted numerous film-shoots. In 1971 the film Death in Venice (Morte a Venezia), directed by Luchino Visconti, starring Dirk Bogarde and Björn Andrésen, and based on Death in Venice, the novella published in 1912 by Thomas Mann, was screened. Both the novella and the film were set at Lido and the Grand Hotel des Bains, where Thomas Mann stayed with his wife and brother in the summer of 1911. The novella was also turned into the Death in Venice opera by Benjamin Britten (his last opera) in 1973 and into a ballet by John Neumeier in 2003.

== Legacy ==
The term Lido, which originates from this island, forms the first part of the name of many seaside resorts in Italy and is used to refer to certain types of outdoor swimming pools, especially in Great Britain. It also the origin of the name "Lido deck" on a cruise ship.

In Thomas Mann's 1912 novella Death in Venice, often considered one of his greatest works, the main character – Aschenbach – stays at the Grand Hotel des Bains in Lido.

Facing Copacabana Beach in Rio de Janeiro, Brazil is the Praça do Lido (Lido Square). It is named for a beach-resort restaurant set up there in the 1920s, which in turn was named in homage to the grand hotels and beach life of the Lido in Venice.

== Gallery ==
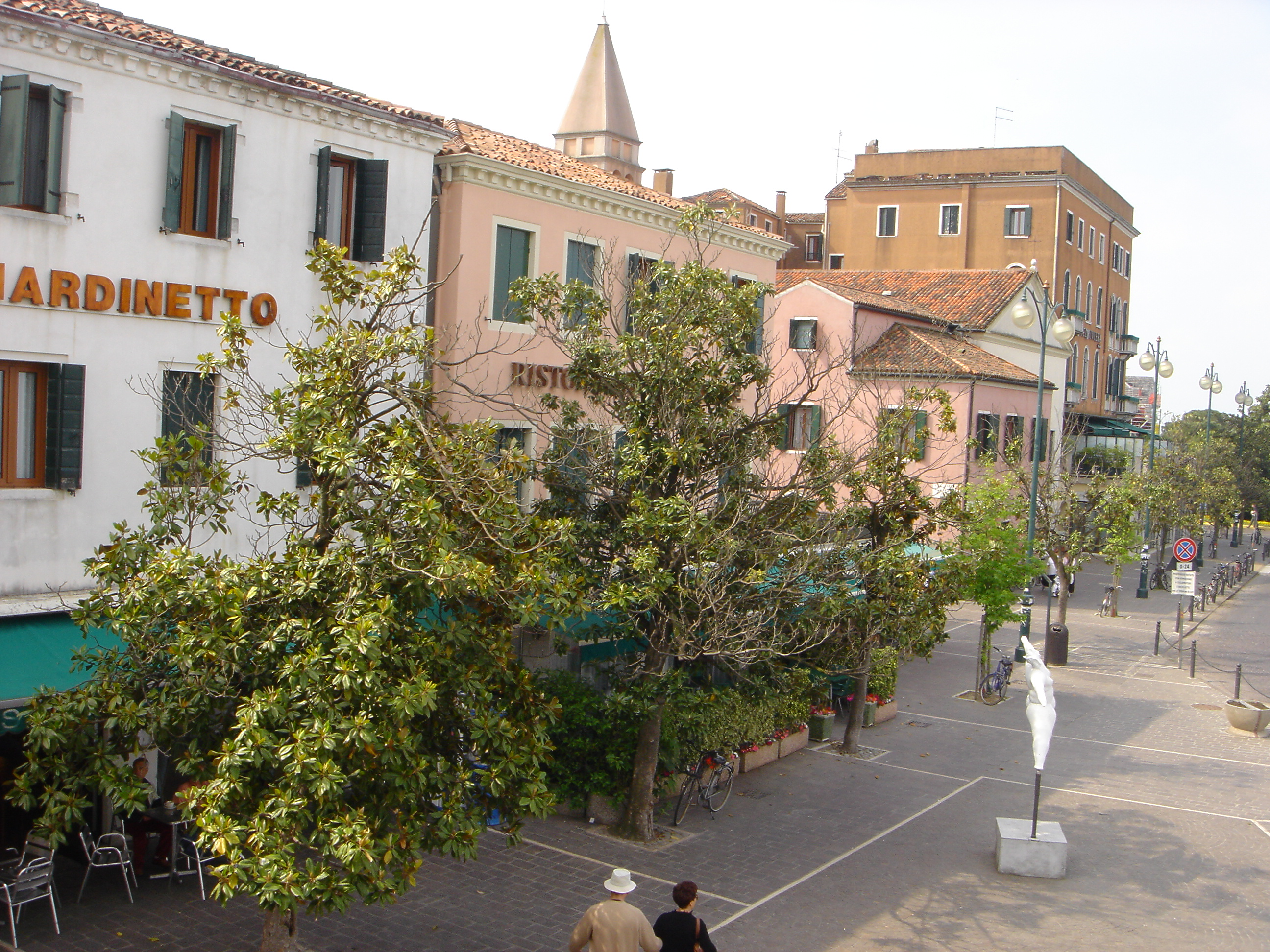
Santa Maria Elisabetta Square

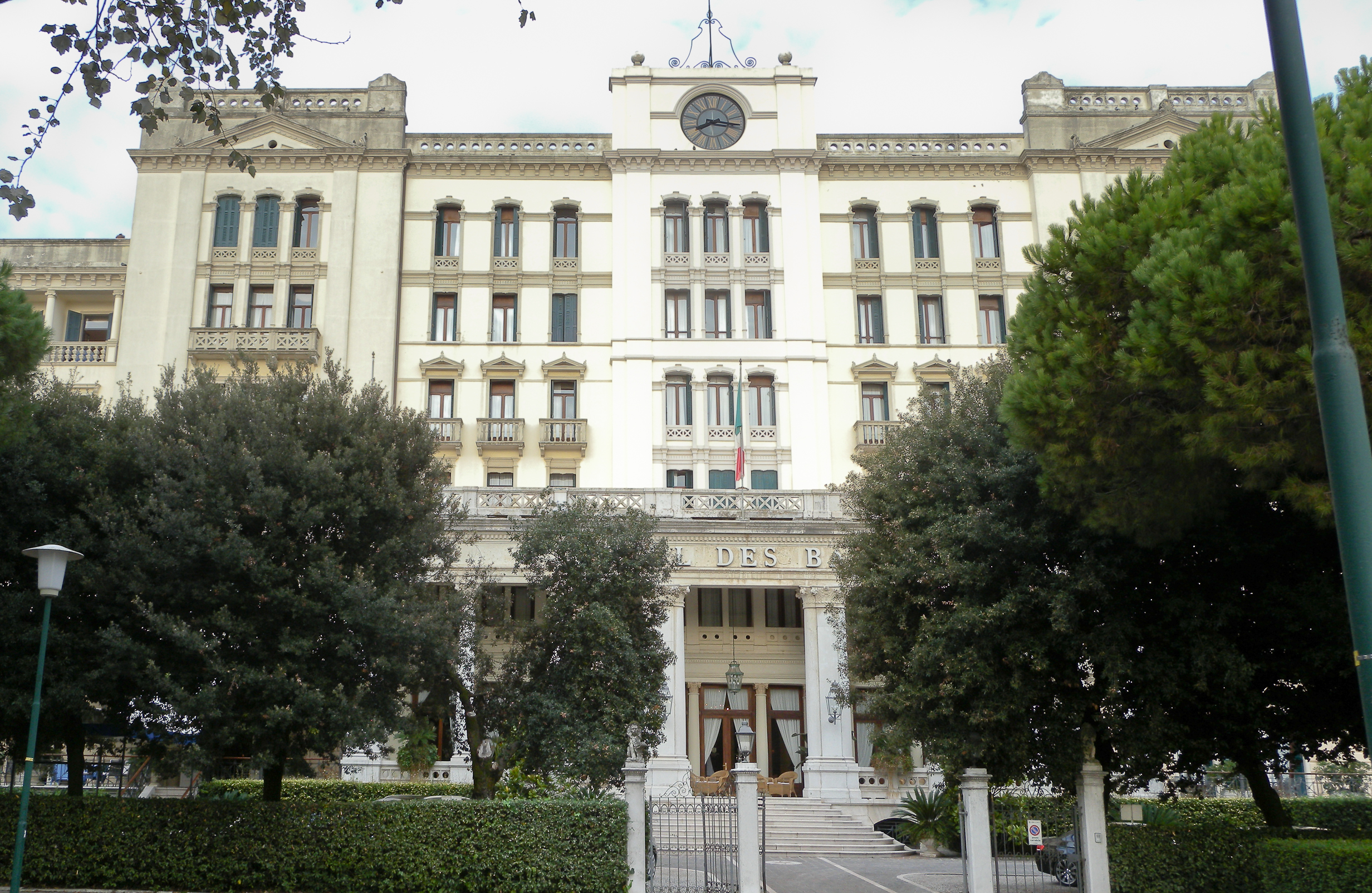
Grand Hotel des Bains

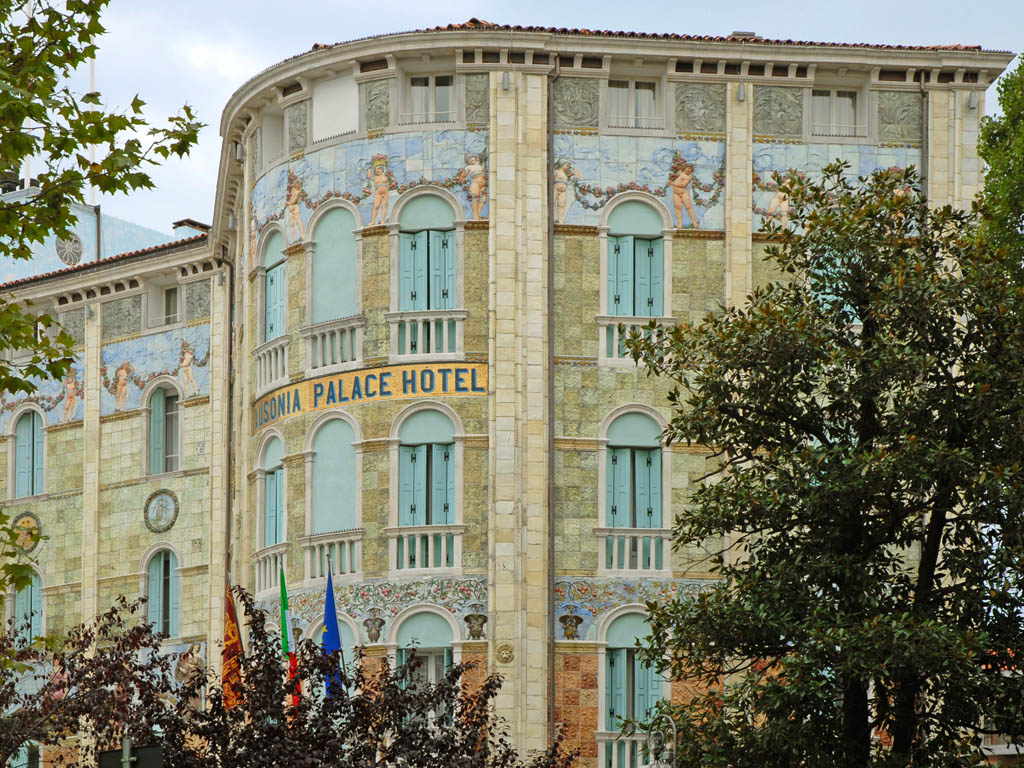
Hotel Ausonia Hungaria

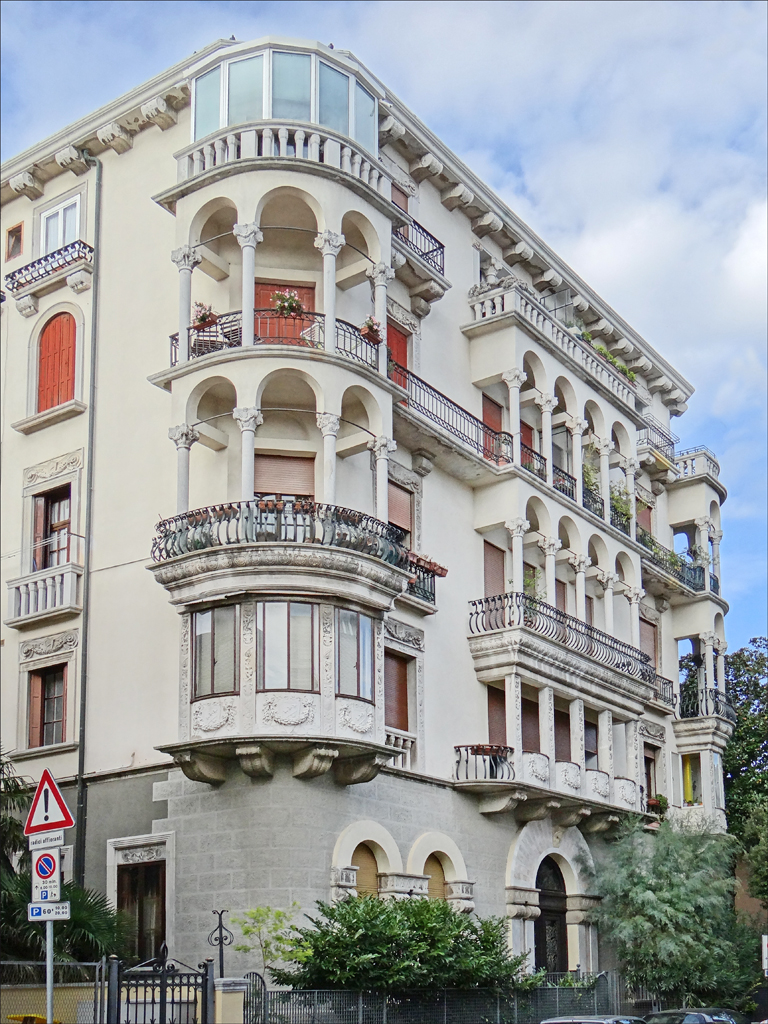
House Licia

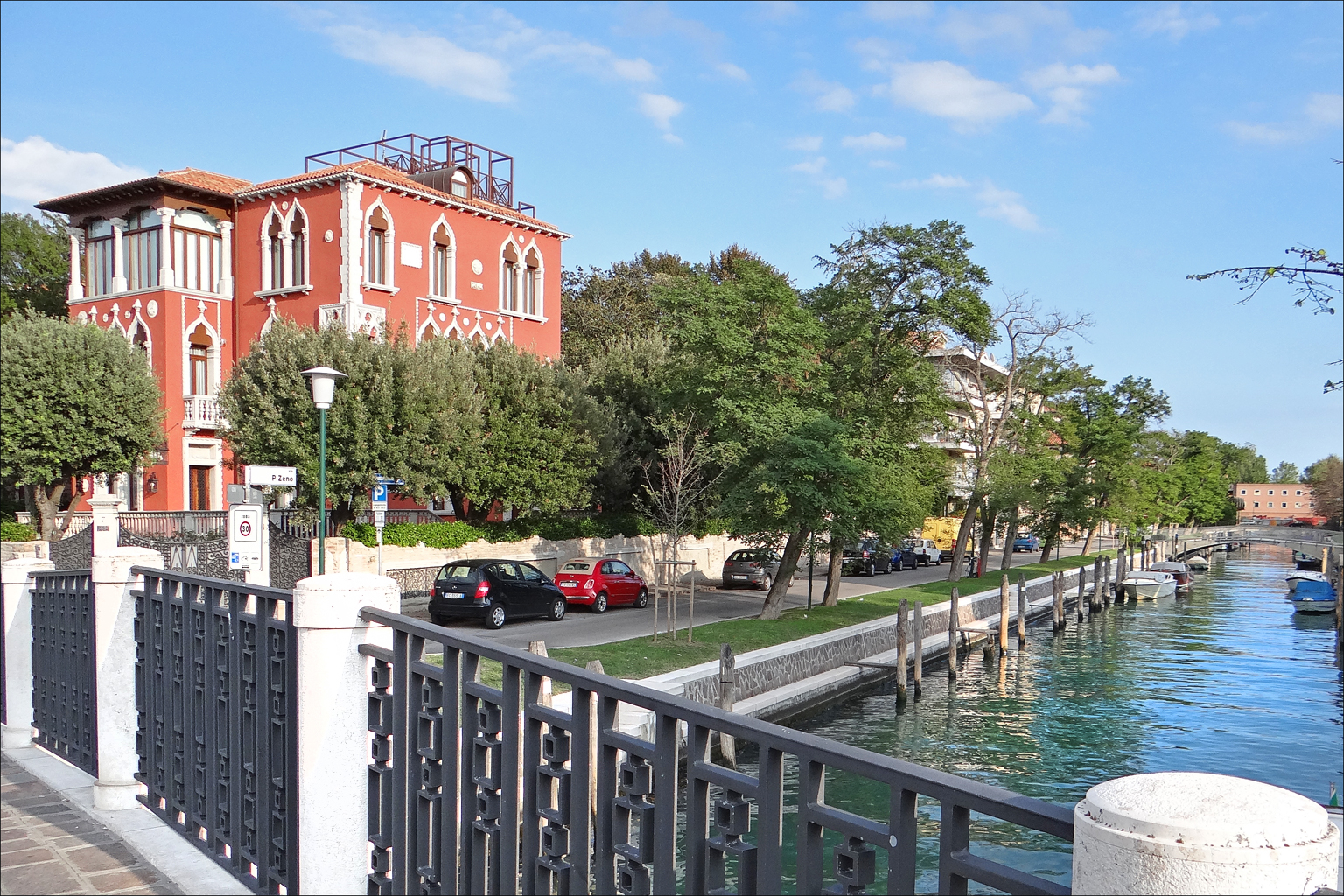
Villa Bianca

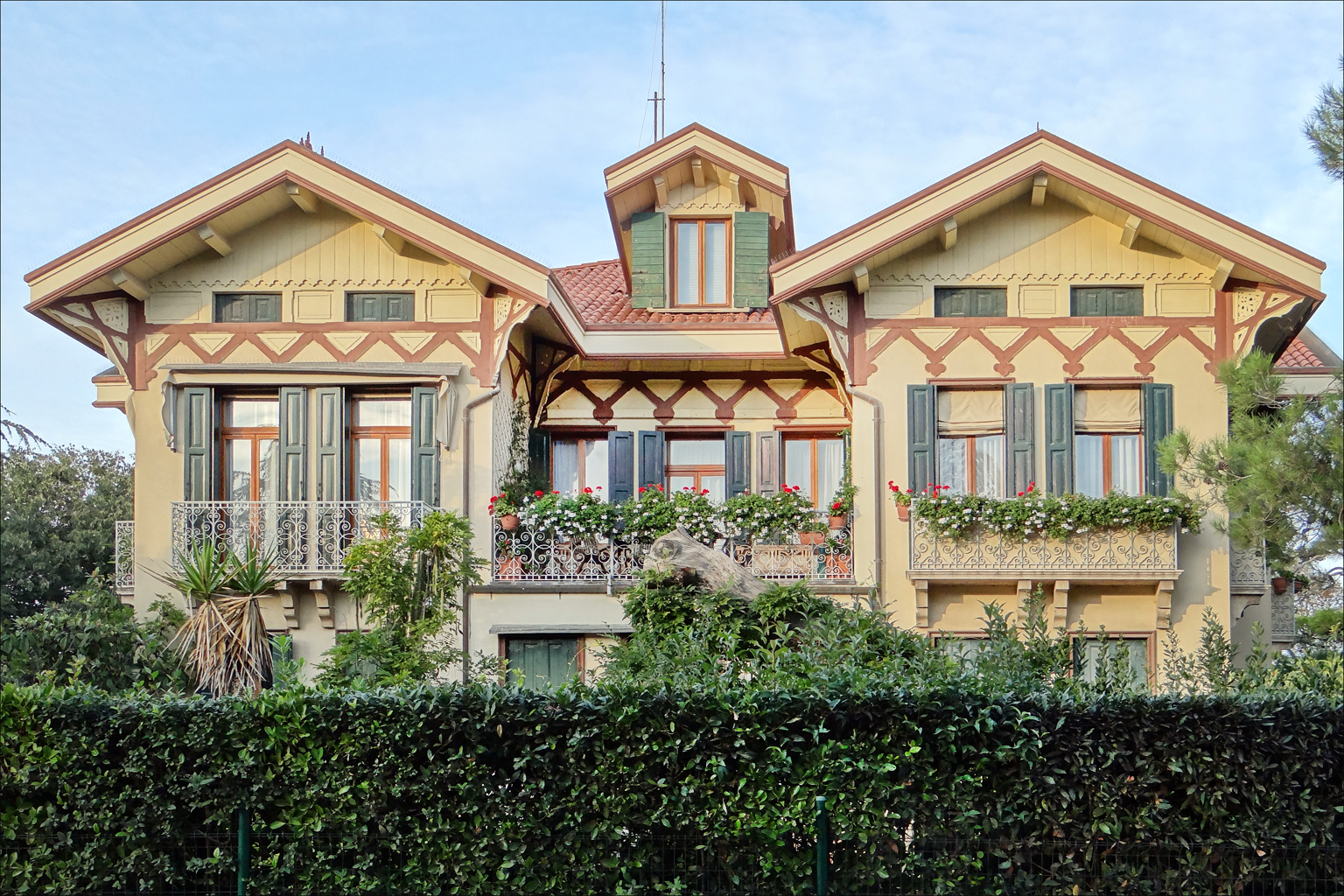
Villa Elena

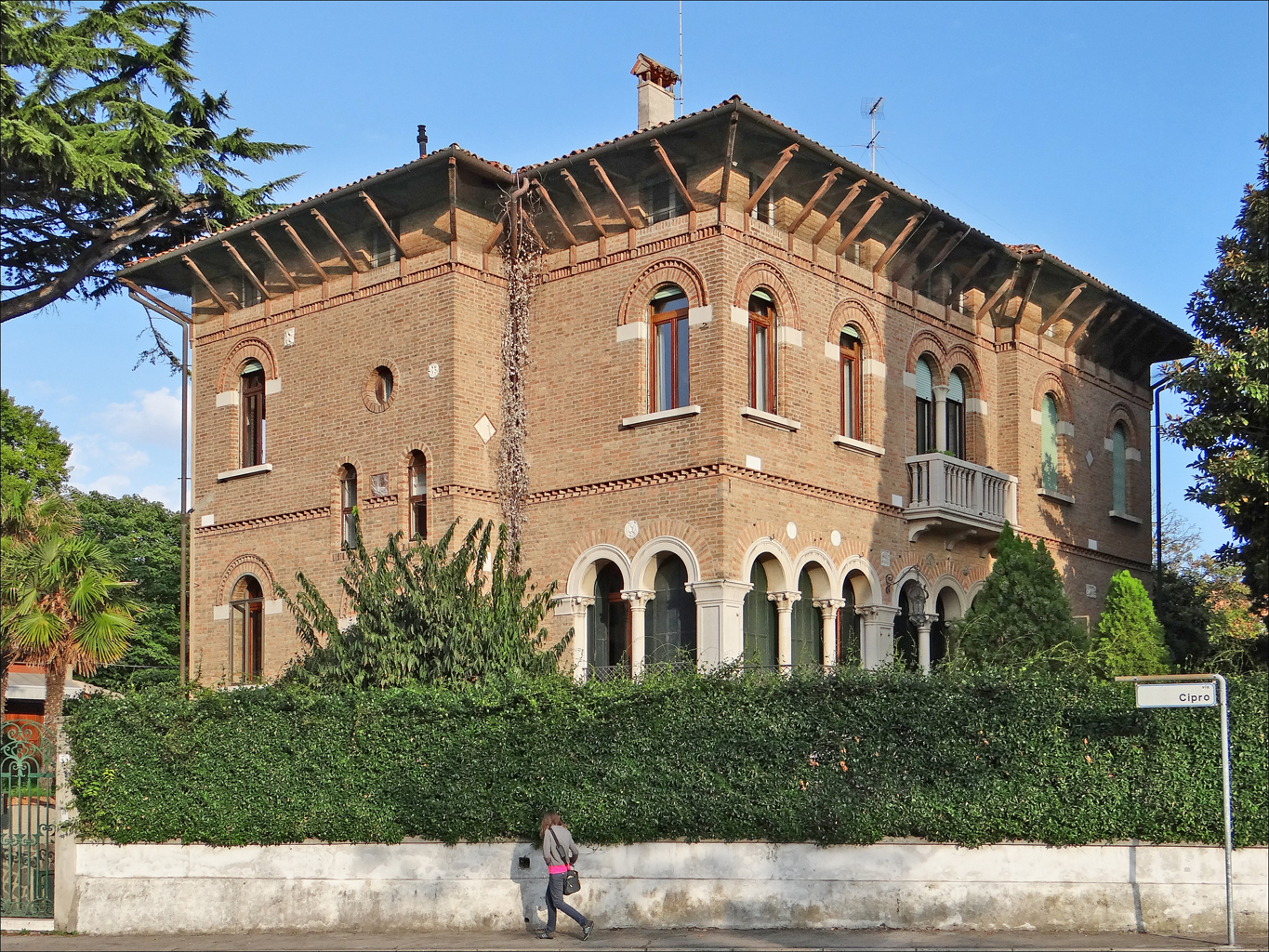
Villa Lombardi

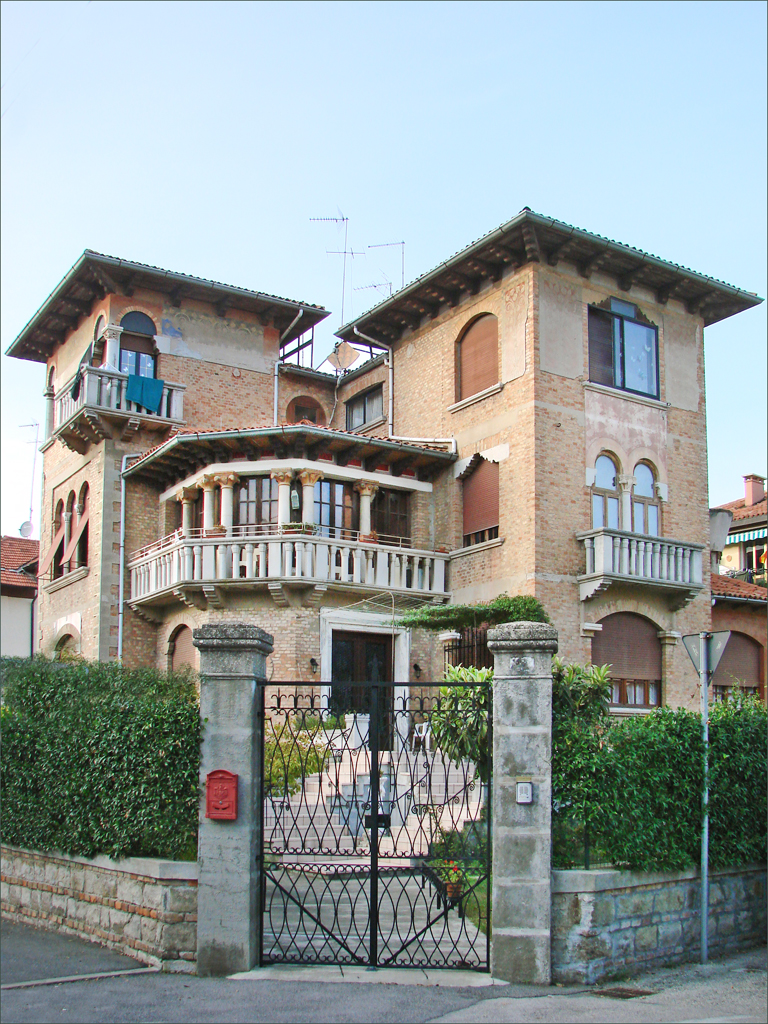
Villa Anita

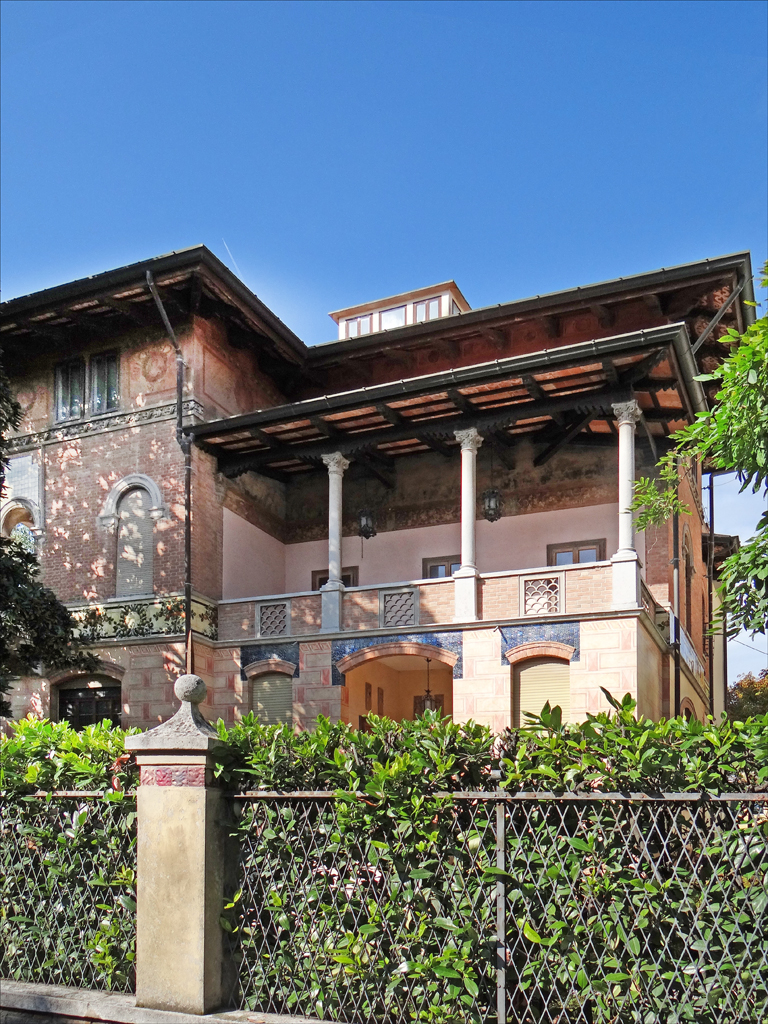
Villa Gemma

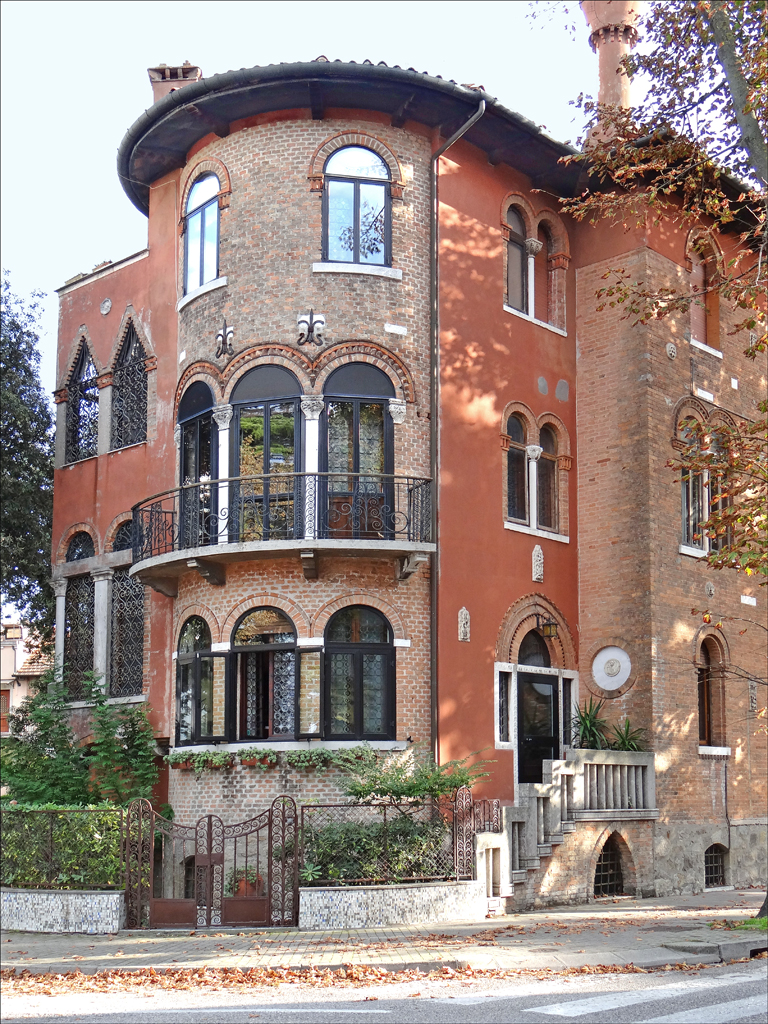
Villa Perez

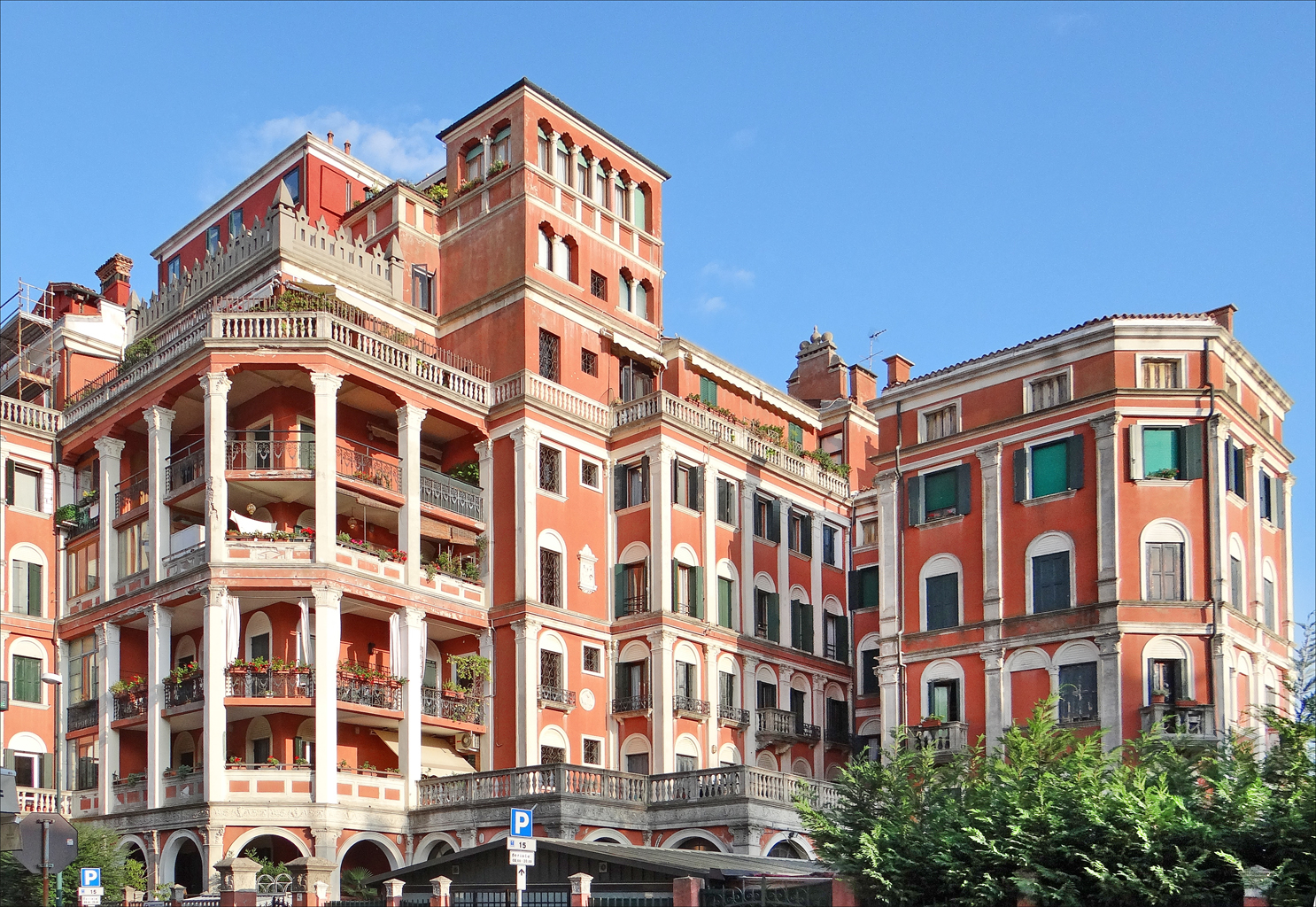
The former hotel Grande Italia
In art

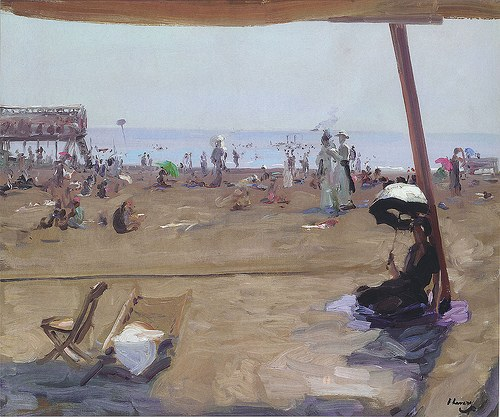
John Lavery, Bathing in the Lido, Venice (1912)

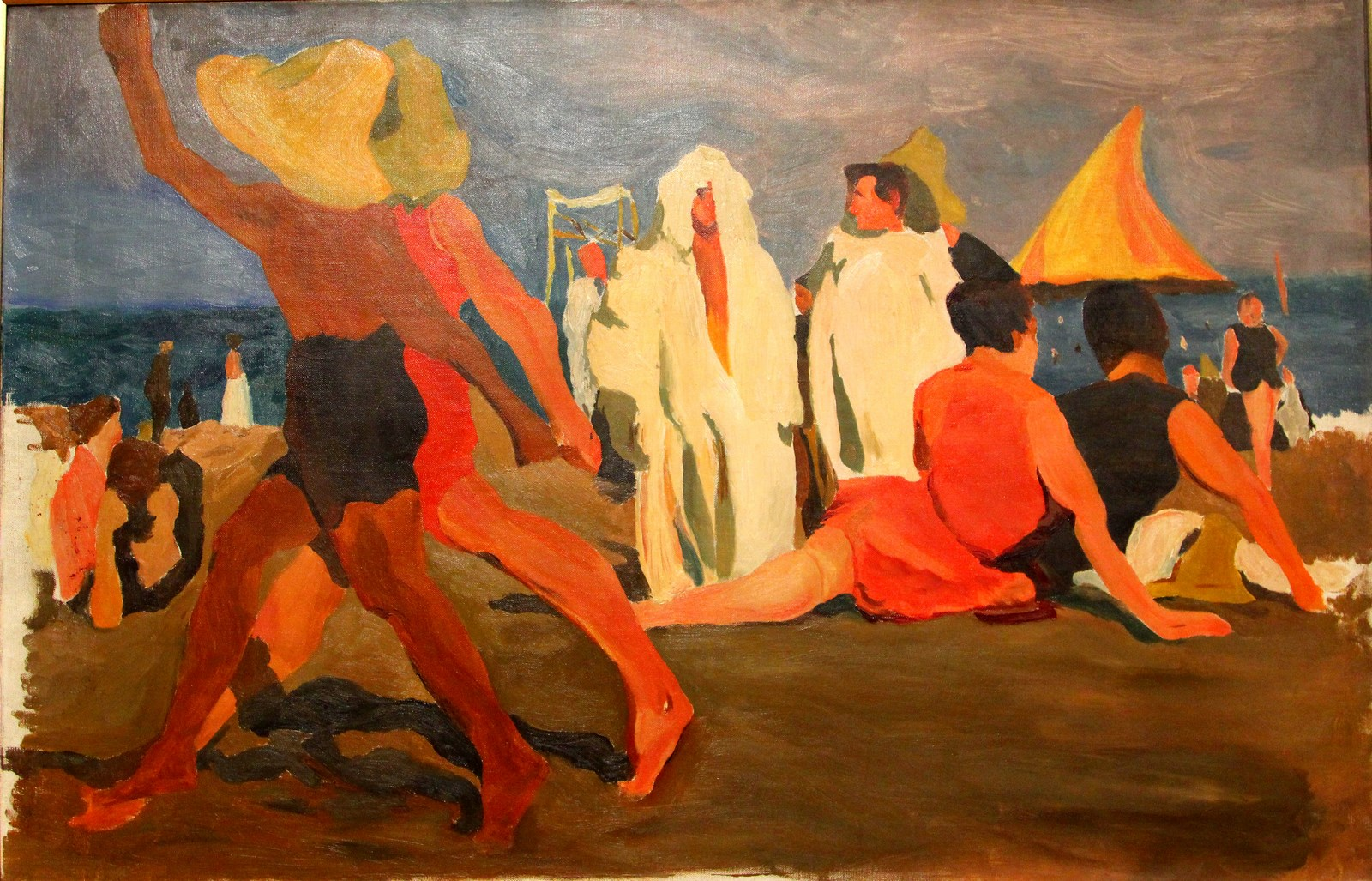
Léon Bakst, Bathers on the Lido (before 1923)

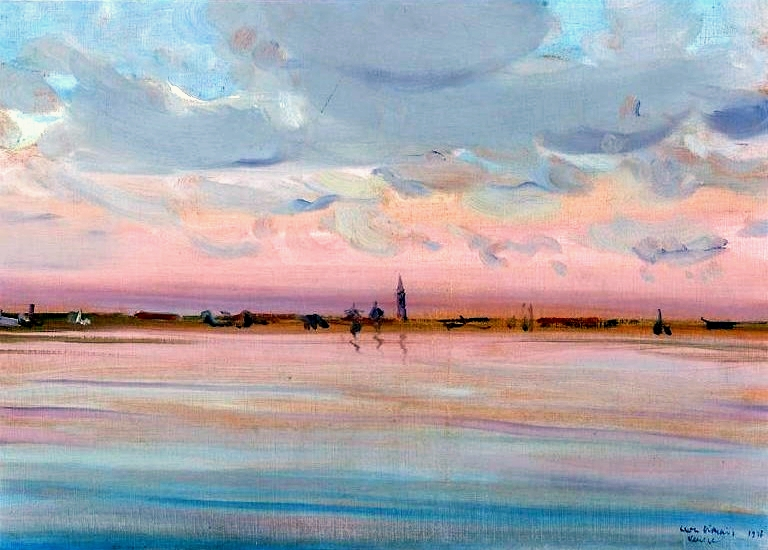
Leon Kaufmann, View of Lido (1926)

== See also ==
- List of islands of Italy
