= Suzanne Moore =

English journalist (born 1958)

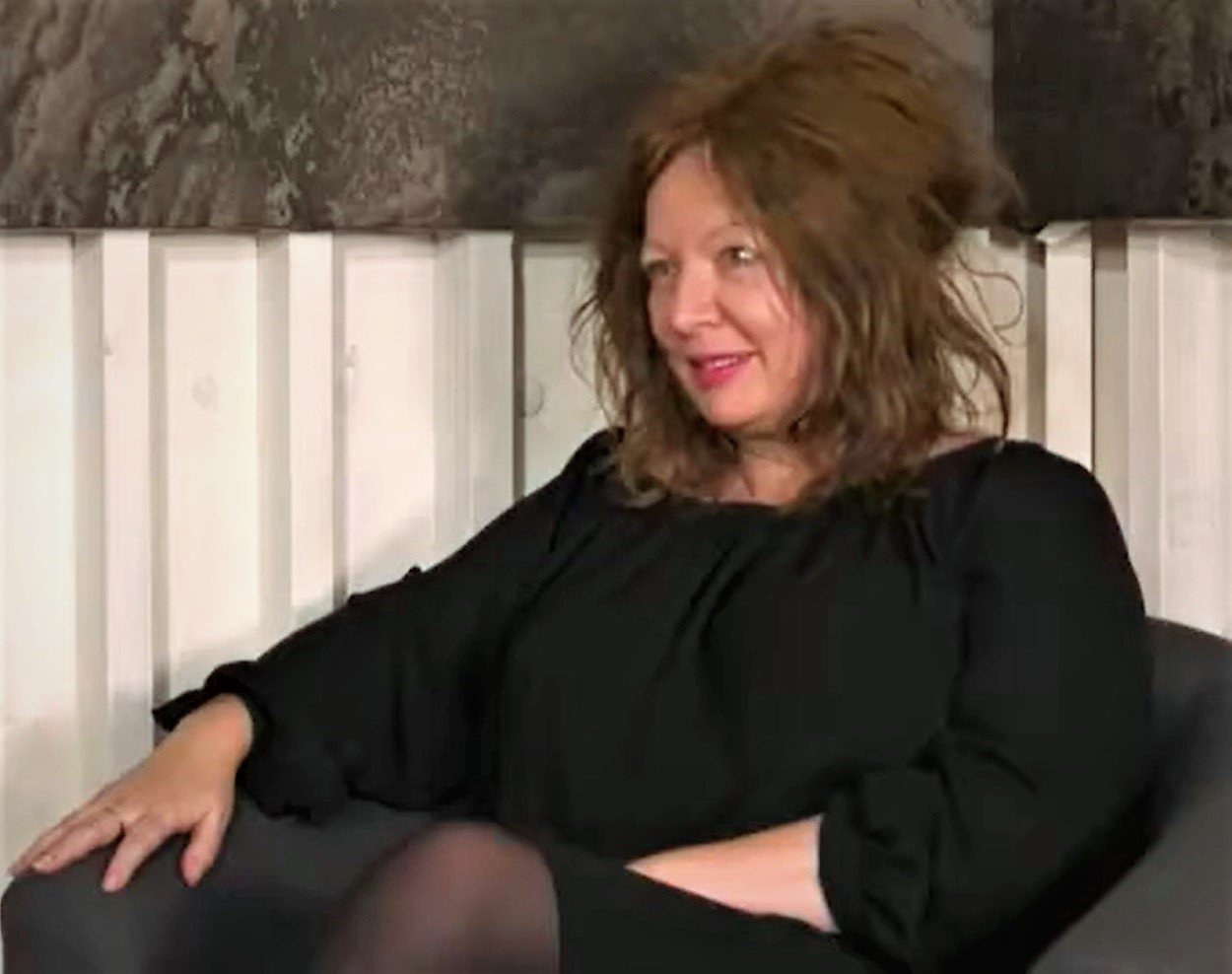
- Moore in 2017
- Born: Suzanne Lynn Moore; 17 July 1958 (age 68); Ipswich, Suffolk, England
- Education: Northgate Grammar School for Girls; Middlesex Polytechnic
- Occupation: Journalist
- Years active: 1980–present
- Children: 3
- Awards: Orwell Prize (2019)
- Suzanne Moore's voice Recorded November 2012 from the BBC Radio 4 programme Woman's Hour

Suzanne Lynn Moore (born 17 July 1958) is an English journalist.

== Early life and education ==
Moore is the daughter of an American father and a working-class British mother, who split up during her childhood. As a child, she was told that her mother had been adopted in infancy when her adoptive parents found her in a Salvation Army orphanage following their only son's death. Moore said: "The older I get, the more I see that the story I was told cannot possibly be true, and that my mother was probably not a tiny baby at all when she was adopted." She grew up in Ipswich and attended Northgate Grammar School for Girls. Moore ran away from home at 16 and moved out aged 17 to live in a bedsit.

After various jobs in Britain and overseas, including waitressing, shop work and door-to-door sales, Moore embarked on a psychology degree at Middlesex Polytechnic, but soon switched to cultural studies. She began a PhD and journalism career simultaneously after graduation, but ceased work on her doctorate after 18 months.

== Career ==
Moore has written for Marxism Today, The Mail on Sunday, the Daily Mail, The Independent, The Guardian, The Telegraph and the New Statesman. In The Guardian in 1995, Moore falsely stated that Germaine Greer had undergone a hysterectomy at 25. Greer responded by criticising Moore's hair, cleavage and footwear. Moore was the winner of the Orwell Prize for Journalism in 2019.

Moore has been extensively opposed to what she terms "trans ideology" - describing trans activists as "scary" and "deranged", - and has advocated for the United Kingdom to "kill off" transgender rights entirely, including access to gender-affirming care, recognition of transgender women as women, and allowance of transgender women into women's changing rooms, shelters, prisons, or sports. In March 2020, following the publication of an opinion piece written by Moore, titled "Women must have the right to organise. We will not be silenced" in The Guardian, the paper received a letter, with over 200 signatories, which rejected Moore's implication that "advocating for trans rights poses a threat to cisgender women". The letter was signed by politicians such as Siân Berry, Christine Jardine, Nadia Whittome and Zarah Sultana, and writers and journalists including Ash Sarkar and Reni Eddo-Lodge. The newspaper published the letter alongside others received in response to the article, both supportive and critical.

In September of the same year, The Telegraph wrote that Moore "had to have police protection some years back as a result of voicing an unpopular opinion and she has been deluged with abuse, rape and death threats online, even threats to rape her children." On 16 November 2020, Moore announced she had left The Guardian. It had been her primary place of employment since the 1990s. In UnHerd, she later wrote that when she had attempted to write "about female experience belonging to people with female bodies... it is always subbed out" by editorial. Moore added that she had never fitted in at The Guardian, saying: "The personal becomes political at the moment you never feel clean enough. I was always somehow inappropriate [there]."

Moore opposed the 2003 invasion of Iraq and wrote several articles criticising the Iraq War. Moore stood as an independent candidate for the constituency of Hackney North and Stoke Newington in the 2010 UK general election due to her disillusionment with the main political parties. She finished sixth with 0.6% of the vote, losing to the Labour incumbent Diane Abbott and forfeiting her deposit.

== Personal life ==
Moore has lived in Hackney, London, since the early 1990s. She is a single mother, with three daughters from three relationships.

Moore is a Jewish republican.
