= Daddy, We Hardly Knew You =

1989 book by Germaine Greer

- Cover of the UK first edition
- Author: Germaine Greer
- Language: English
- Subjects: Biography
- Publisher: Hamish Hamilton
- Publication date: 1989
- Publication place: United Kingdom
- Media type: Print
- Pages: 311

Daddy, We Hardly Knew You is a 1989 book by feminist academic Germaine Greer. The book is a study of her father who was an Australian intelligence officer during World War II. According to Penguin Random House, the book took three years to write and her objective was to discover information about her father, who she claimed had been distant from her during his life.

== Reception ==
Peter Craven, writing for the Australian Book Review "found it difficult to stop reading". In her review of the book for the LA Times, Nancy Mairs wrote "there are plenty of terrific passages... Too often, however, the insights are facile". Publishers Weekly considered its "deeply affecting climax is a remarkable feat of family reconstruction". Hope Hewitt described it as "an absorbing read, and a many-levelled piece of social history" in the Canberra Times.
