= Alan Little =

Alan Little may refer to:

- Alan Little (academic) (1934–1986), English social scientist
- Alan Little (footballer) (1955–2024), English footballer and football manager

== See also ==
- Allan Little (born 1959), former BBC correspondent
