= Germaine Greer =

Australian writer and public intellectual (born 1939)

Professor Germaine Greer
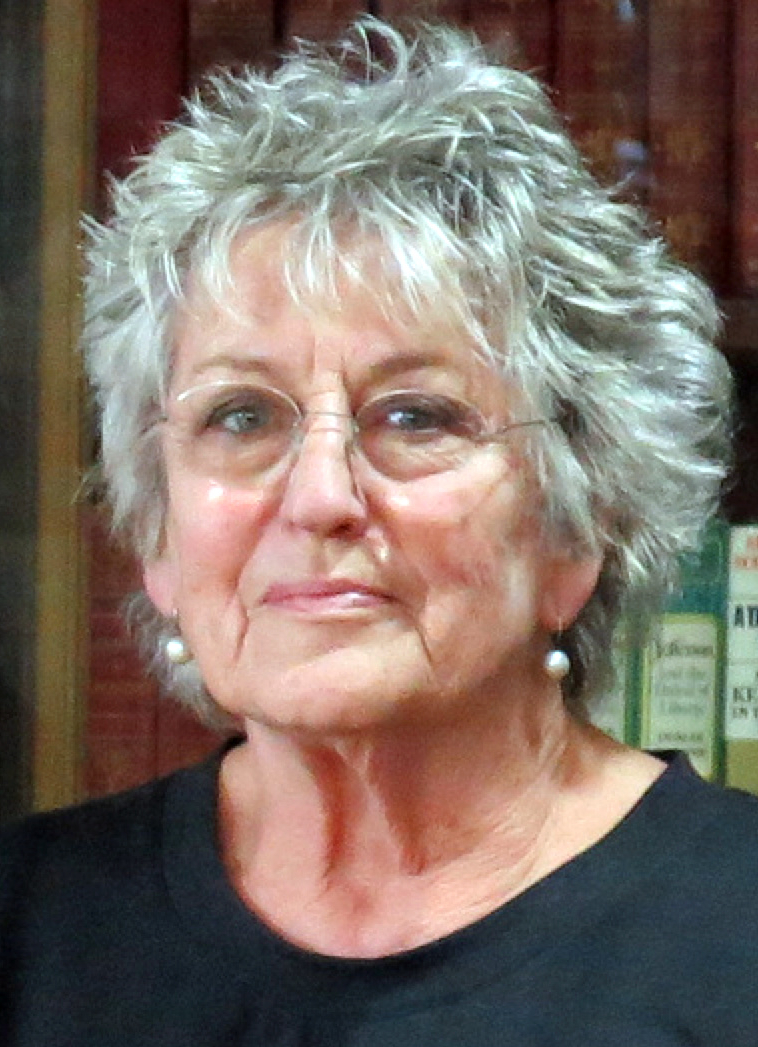
- Greer at the University of Melbourne in 2013
- Born: 29 January 1939 (age 87); Melbourne, Victoria, Australia
- Other names: Dr. G (for Oz); Rose Blight (for Private Eye); Earth Rose (for Suck)
- Education: University of Melbourne (BA); University of Sydney (MA); Newnham College, Cambridge (PhD)
- PhD thesis: The Ethic of Love and Marriage in Shakespeare's Early Comedies (1968)
- Occupation: Writer
- Years active: 1970–present
- Era: Second-wave feminism
- Notable work: The Female Eunuch (1970)
- Spouse: Paul du Feu (m. 1968; div. 1973)
- Germaine Greer speaking Recorded August 2007 from Bookclub, BBC Radio 4

Germaine Greer (/ɡrɪər/; born 29 January 1939) is an Australian writer and public intellectual, regarded as one of the major voices of the second-wave feminism movement in the latter half of the 20th century.

Specialising in English and women's literature, Greer has held academic positions in England at the University of Warwick and Newnham College, Cambridge, and in the United States at the University of Tulsa. She started living in the UK in 1964, and from the 1990s until her later years, divided her time between Queensland, Australia, and her home in Essex, England.

Greer's ideas have created controversy ever since her first book, The Female Eunuch (1970), made her a household name. An international bestseller and a watershed text in the feminist movement, it offered a systematic deconstruction of ideas such as womanhood and femininity, arguing that women were forced to assume submissive roles in society to fulfil male fantasies of what being a woman entailed.

Greer's subsequent work has focused on literature, feminism, and the environment. She has written over 20 books, including Sex and Destiny (1984), The Change (1991), The Whole Woman (1999), and The Boy (2003). Her 2013 book White Beech: The Rainforest Years describes her efforts to restore an area of rainforest in the Numinbah Valley in Australia. In addition to her academic work and activism, she has been a prolific columnist for The Sunday Times, The Guardian, The Daily Telegraph, The Spectator, The Independent, and The Oldie, among others.

Greer is a liberation (or radical) rather than equality feminist. (Note: Germaine Greer, "All About Women" (2015): "I've always been a liberation feminist. I'm not an equality feminist. I think that's a profoundly conservative aim, and it wouldn't change anything. It would just mean that women were implicated.") Her goal is not equality with men, which she sees as assimilation and "agreeing to live the lives of unfree men". "Women's liberation", she wrote in The Whole Woman (1999), "did not see the female's potential in terms of the male's actual." She argues instead that liberation is about asserting difference and "insisting on it as a condition of self-definition and self-determination". It is a struggle for the freedom of women to "define their own values, order their own priorities and decide their own fate". (Note: Germaine Greer (The Whole Woman, 1999): "In 1970 the movement was called 'Women's Liberation' or, contemptuously, 'Women's Lib'. When the name 'Libbers' was dropped for 'Feminists' we were all relieved. What none of us noticed was that the ideal of liberation was fading out with the word. We were settling for equality. Liberation struggles are not about assimilation but about asserting difference, endowing that difference with dignity and prestige, and insisting on it as a condition of self-definition and self-determination. The aim of women's liberation is to do as much for female people as has been done for colonized nations. Women's liberation did not see the female's potential in terms of the male's actual; the visionary feminists of the late sixties and early seventies knew that women could never find freedom by agreeing to live the lives of unfree men. Seekers after equality clamoured to be admitted to smoke-filled male haunts. Liberationists sought the world over for clues as to what women's lives could be like if they were free to define their own values, order their own priorities and decide their own fate. The Female Eunuch was one feminist text that did not argue for equality.")

== Early life and education ==
=== Melbourne ===
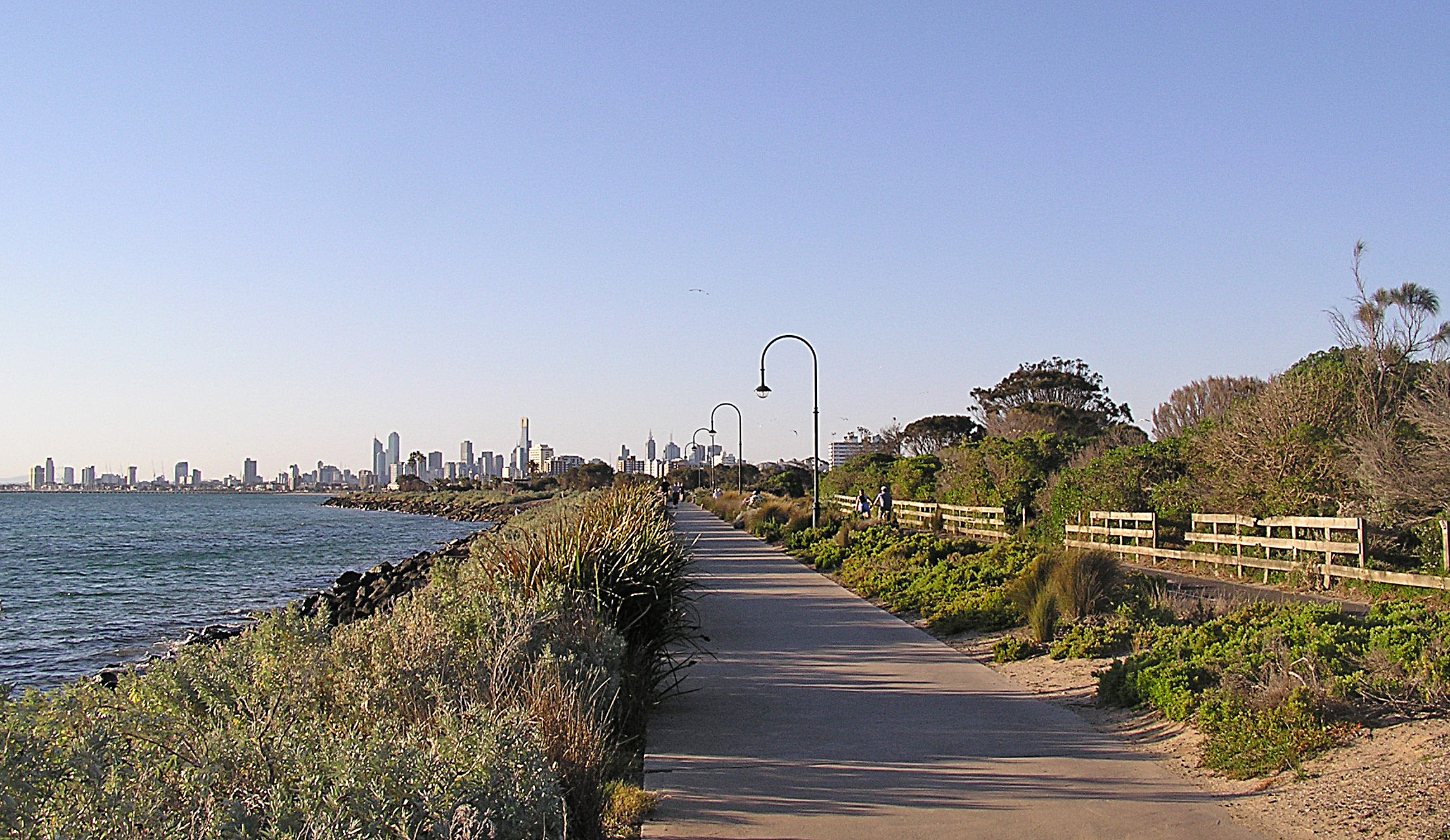
Elwood beach. The skyline of the Melbourne city centre is visible in the distance.

Germaine Greer was born on 29 January 1939 in Melbourne to a Catholic family, the elder of two girls followed by a boy. Her father called himself Eric Reginald ("Reg") Greer; he told her he had been born in South Africa, but she learned after his death that he was born Robert Hamilton King in Launceston, Tasmania. She also learned he was christened Robert Henry Eric Ernest Hambert. He and her mother, Margaret ("Peggy") May Lafrank, had married in March 1937; Reg converted to Catholicism before the wedding. Peggy was a milliner and Reg a newspaper-advertising salesman. (Note: Greer's maternal grandparents were Alida ("Liddy") Lafrank, née Jensen, and Albert Lafrank.) Despite her Catholic upbringing and her father's open antisemitism, Greer became convinced that her father was secretly of Jewish heritage. She believed her grandmother had been a Jewish woman named Rachel Weiss, but admits that she probably made this up out of an "intense longing to be Jewish." Despite not knowing whether she had any Jewish ancestry, Greer "felt Jewish" and began to involve herself in the Jewish community. She learned Yiddish, joined a Jewish theatre group, and dated Jewish men.

The family lived in the Melbourne suburb of Elwood, at first in a rented flat in Docker Street, near the beach, then in another rented flat on the Esplanade. In January 1942 Greer's father joined the Second Australian Imperial Force; after training with the Royal Australian Air Force, he worked on ciphers for the British Royal Air Force in Egypt and Malta. Greer attended St Columba's Catholic Primary School in Elwood from February 1943—the family was by then living at 57 Ormond Road, Elwood—followed by Sacred Heart Parish School, Sandringham, and Holy Redeemer School, Ripponlea.

In 1952 Greer won a scholarship to Star of the Sea College in Gardenvale, a convent school run by the Sisters of the Presentation of the Blessed Virgin Mary. It was here that Greer said she was introduced to art and music. That year, artwork by her was included in the under-14 section of the Children's Art Exhibition at Tye's Gallery, opened by Archbishop Mannix. A school report called her "a bit of a mad-cap and somewhat erratic in her studies and in her personal responses", although Greer was a precocious child; in addition to English, Greer had learnt three European languages by the age of 12, and in her final exams achieved the second-highest grade in the state. Greer described her childhood at home as a "long-remembered boredom" and stated that it was the tedium and emotional distance of her parents that drove her to become an overachiever.

A year after leaving school, Greer left the Catholic faith, having found the nuns' arguments for the existence of God unconvincing. She left home when she was 18. She had a difficult relationship with her mother who, according to Greer, probably had Asperger syndrome. In 2012 she said that her brother might have forgiven her for "abandoning" them, but she was not so sure about her sister, "whom I love more than anyone else on earth".

=== University ===
==== Melbourne and Sydney ====
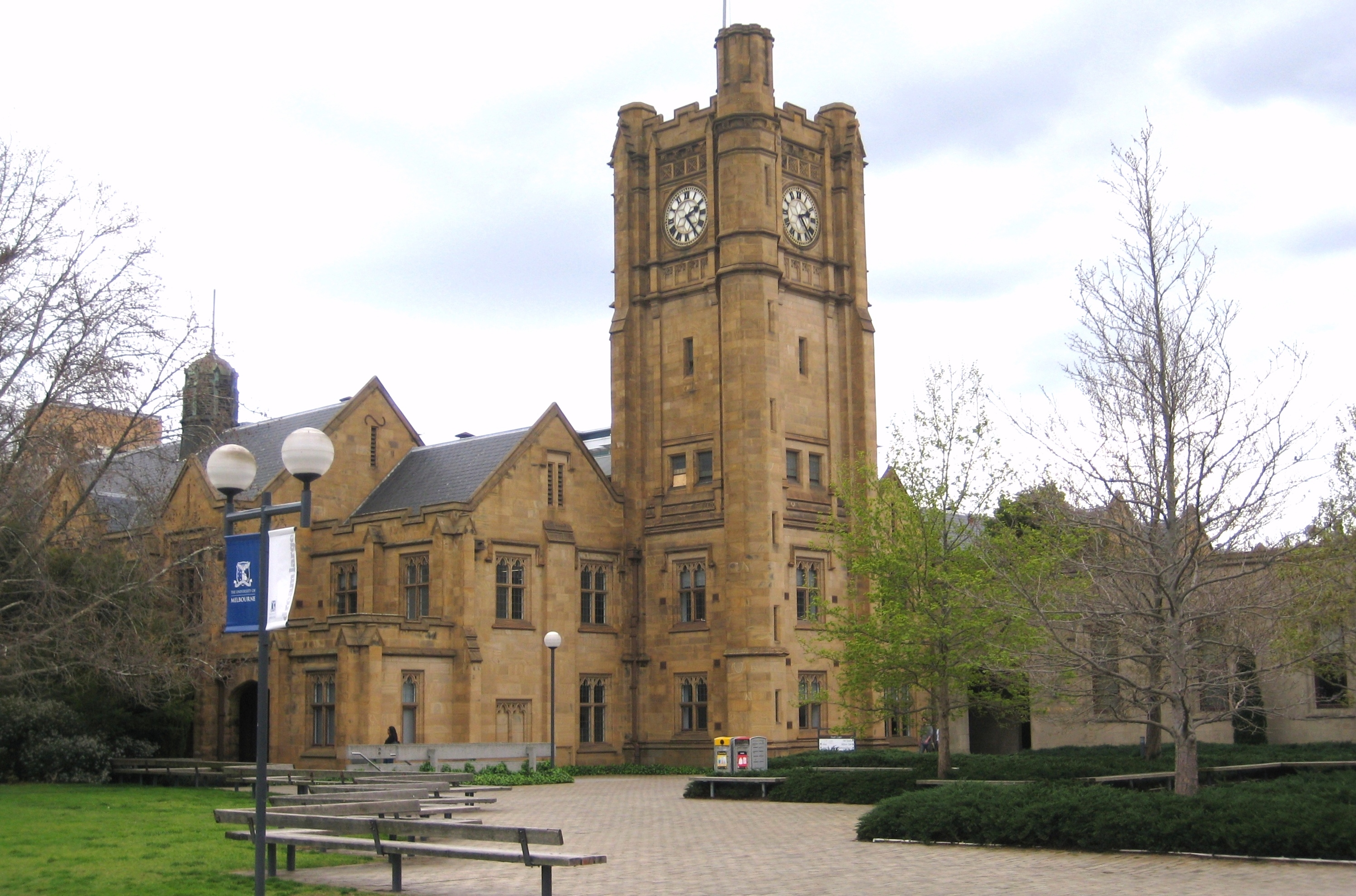
The Old Arts building, University of Melbourne

From 1956 Greer studied English and French language and literature at the University of Melbourne on a Teacher's College Scholarship, living at home for the first two years on an allowance of £8 a week. 1.8 metres (6 feet) tall by the age of 16, she was a striking figure. "Tall, loose-limbed and good-humoured, she strode around the campus, aware that she was much talked about", according to the journalist Peter Blazey, a contemporary at Melbourne. In her first year, Greer was briefly treated in hospital for depression. She told Playboy magazine, in an interview published in 1972, that she had been raped while in her second year at university, an experience she described in detail in The Guardian in March 1995. In the same year, Greer had an abortion after a breakdown in a relationship and has described the time as an "annus horribilis".

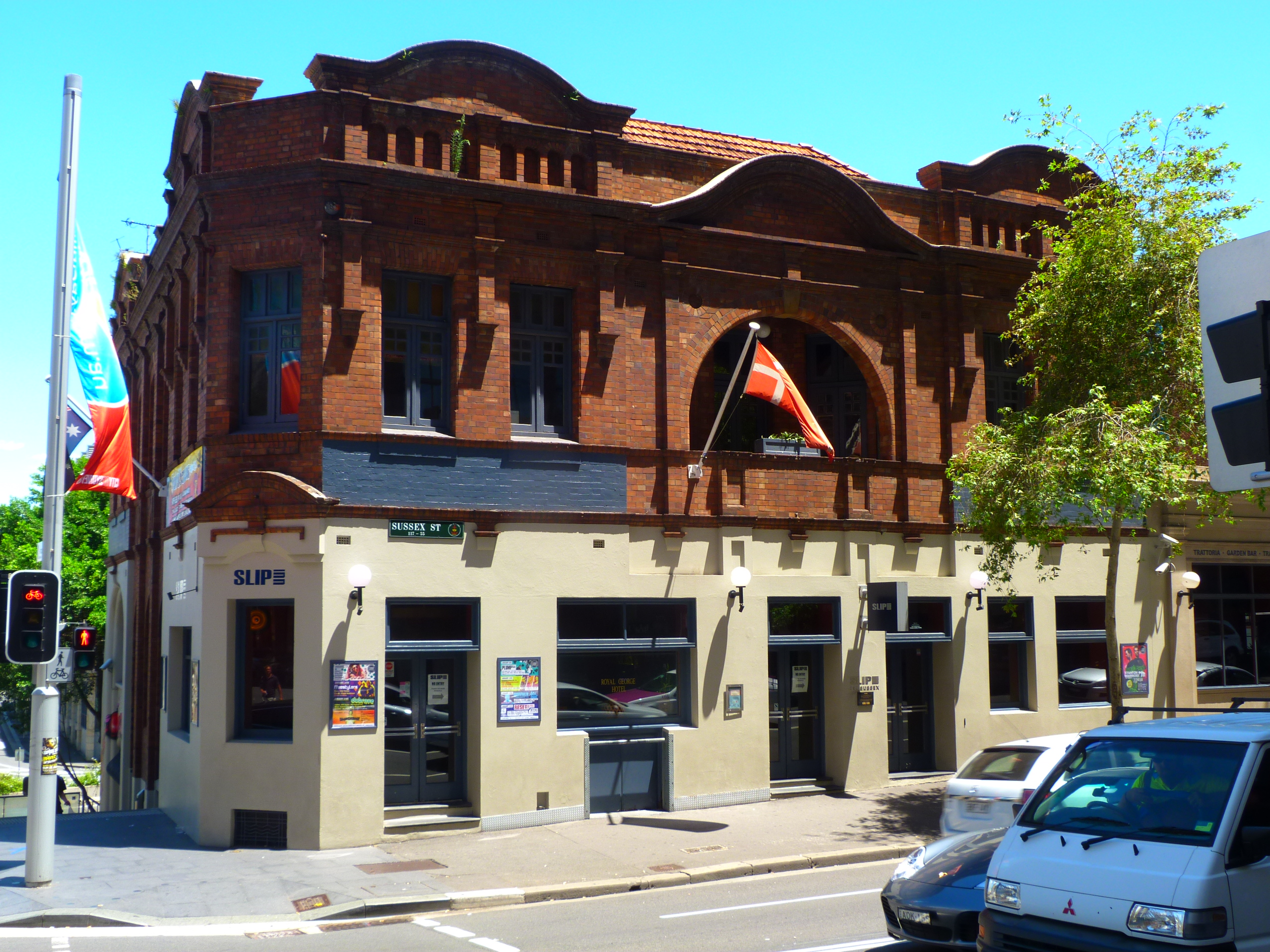
Royal George Hotel, Sydney, 2010

Just before she graduated from Melbourne in 1959 with an upper second, she moved to Sydney, where she became involved with the Sydney Push and the anarchist Sydney Libertarians. "[T]hese people talked about truth and only truth", she said, "insisting that most of what we were exposed to during the day was ideology, which was a synonym for lies—or bullshit, as they called it." They would meet in a back room of the Royal George Hotel on Sussex Street. Clive James was involved with the group at the time. One of Greer's biographers, Christine Wallace, wrote that Greer "walked into the Royal George Hotel, into the throng talking themselves hoarse in a room stinking of stale beer and thick with cigarette smoke, and set out to follow the Push way of life, 'an intolerably difficult discipline which I forced myself to learn'". Greer already thought of herself as an anarchist without knowing why she was drawn to it; through the Push, she became familiar with anarchist literature. She had significant relationships in the group with Harry Hooton and Roelof Smilde, both prominent members. She shared an apartment with Smilde on Glebe Point Road, but the relationship did not last; according to Wallace, the Push ideology of "free love" involved the rejection of possessiveness and jealousy, which naturally worked in the men's favour.

When the relationship with Smilde ended, Greer enrolled at the University of Sydney to study Byron, where, Clive James wrote, she became "famous for her brilliantly foul tongue". One of her friends there, Arthur Dignam, said that she "was the only woman we had met at that stage who could confidently, easily and amusingly put men down". She became involved in acting at Sydney and played Mother Courage in Mother Courage and Her Children in August 1963. That year she was awarded a first-class MA for a thesis entitled "The Development of Byron's Satiric Mode", and took up an appointment at Sydney as senior tutor in English, with an office next door to Stephen Knight in the university's Carslaw Building. "She was undoubtedly an excellent teacher", he said. "And one of the best lecturers—one of the few who could command the Wallace Lecture Theatre, with its 600 students. She had a kind of histrionic quality which was quite remarkable, added to her real scholarship."

==== Cambridge ====
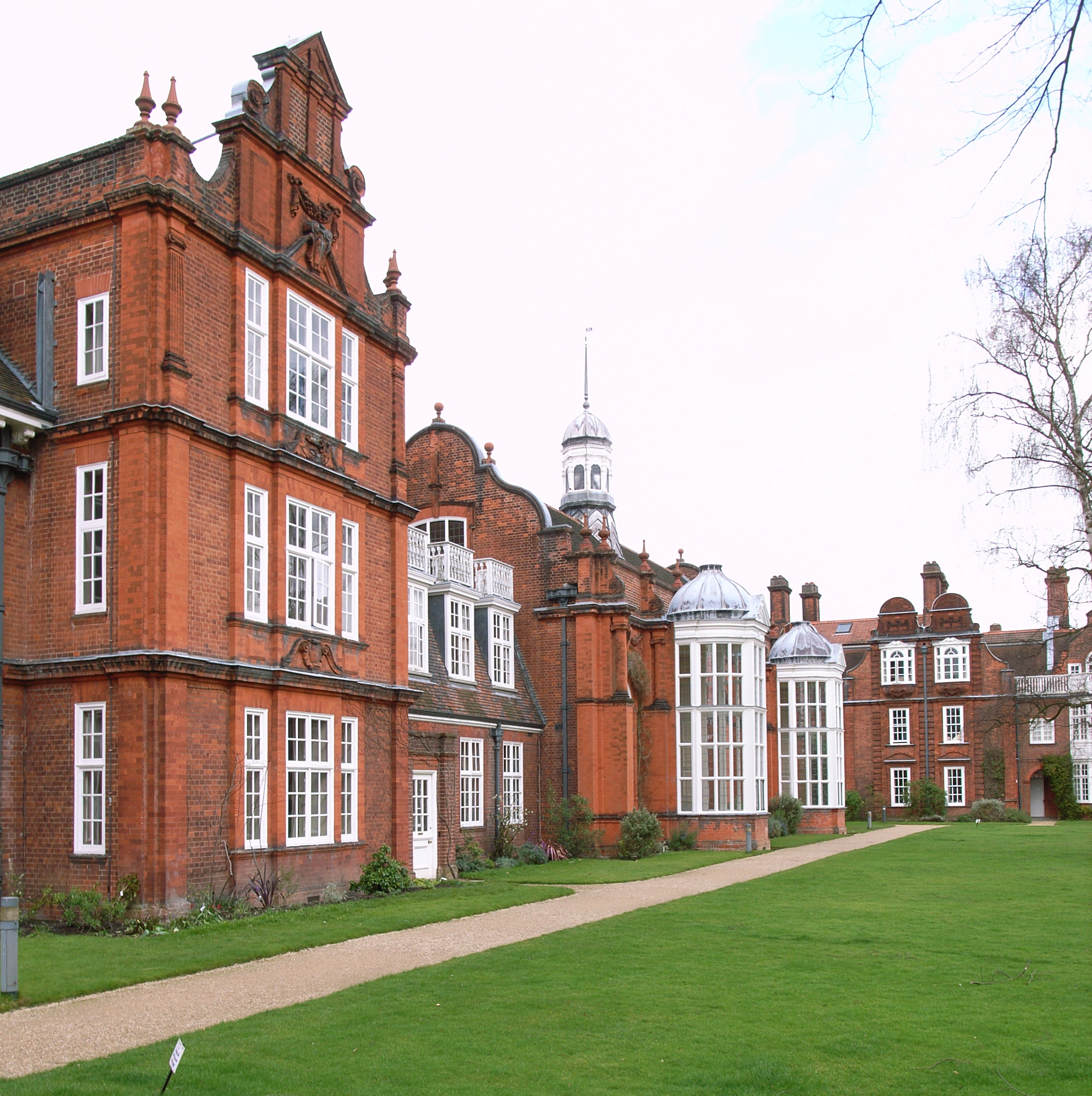
Newnham College, Cambridge

The MA won Greer a Commonwealth Scholarship, with which she funded further studies at the University of Cambridge, arriving in October 1964 at Newnham College, a women-only college. She had been encouraged to move from Sydney by Sam Goldberg, a Leavisite, who had been Challis Chair of English Literature at Sydney since 1963. Initially joining a BA course at Cambridge—her scholarship would have allowed her to complete it in two years—Greer managed to switch after the first term ("by force of argument", according to Clive James) to the PhD programme to study Shakespeare, supervised by Anne Barton, then known as Anne Righter. She said she switched because she "realized they were not going to teach [her] anything". Muriel Bradbrook, Cambridge's first female Professor of English, persuaded Greer to study Shakespeare; Bradbrook had supervised Barton's PhD.

Left to right: Hilary Walston, Germaine Greer and Sheila Buhr, joining the Footlights, Cambridge News, November 1964

Cambridge was a difficult environment for women. As Christine Wallace notes, one Newnham student described her husband receiving a dinner invitation in 1966 from Christ's College that allowed "Wives in for sherry only". Lisa Jardine first encountered Greer at a formal dinner in Newnham. The principal had asked for silence for speeches. "As a hush descended, one person continued to speak, too engrossed in her conversation to notice":

At the graduates' table, Germaine was explaining with passion that there could be no liberation for women, no matter how highly educated, as long as we were required to cram our breasts into bras constructed like mini-Vesuviuses, two stitched, white, cantilevered cones which bore no resemblance to the female anatomy. The willingly suffered discomfort of the Sixties bra, she opined vigorously, was a hideous symbol of male oppression.

As soon as she arrived, Greer auditioned (with Clive James, whom she knew from the Sydney Push) for the student acting company, the Footlights, in its club room in Falcon Yard above a Mac Fisheries shop. They performed a sketch in which he was Noël Coward and she was Gertrude Lawrence. Joining on the same day as James and Russell Davies, Greer was one of the first women to be admitted as a full member, along with Sheila Buhr and Hilary Walston. (Note: There had been women before who had been allowed to join in, but not as full members. Christine Wallace (1999): "A former Newnham student had paved the way: the actress Eleanor Bron, who appeared in Footlights in the late 1950s. The decision to extend membership to women has been attributed to Tim Brooke-Taylor, and to Eric Idle, the Footlights president.) The Cambridge News carried a news item about it in November 1964, referring to the women as "three girls". Greer's response to being accepted was reportedly: "This place is jumping with freckle-punchers. You can have it on your own." She did take part in its 1965 revue, My Girl Herbert, alongside Eric Idle (the Footlights president), John Cameron, Christie Davies and John Grillo. A critic noticed "an Australian girl who had a natural ability to project her voice". Other members of the Footlights when she was there included Tim Brooke-Taylor, John Cleese, Peter Cook and David Frost.

Greer lived for a time in the room next to Clive James at Friar House on Bene't Street, opposite The Eagle. Referring to her as "Romaine Rand", James described her room in his memoir of Cambridge, May Week Was In June (1991):

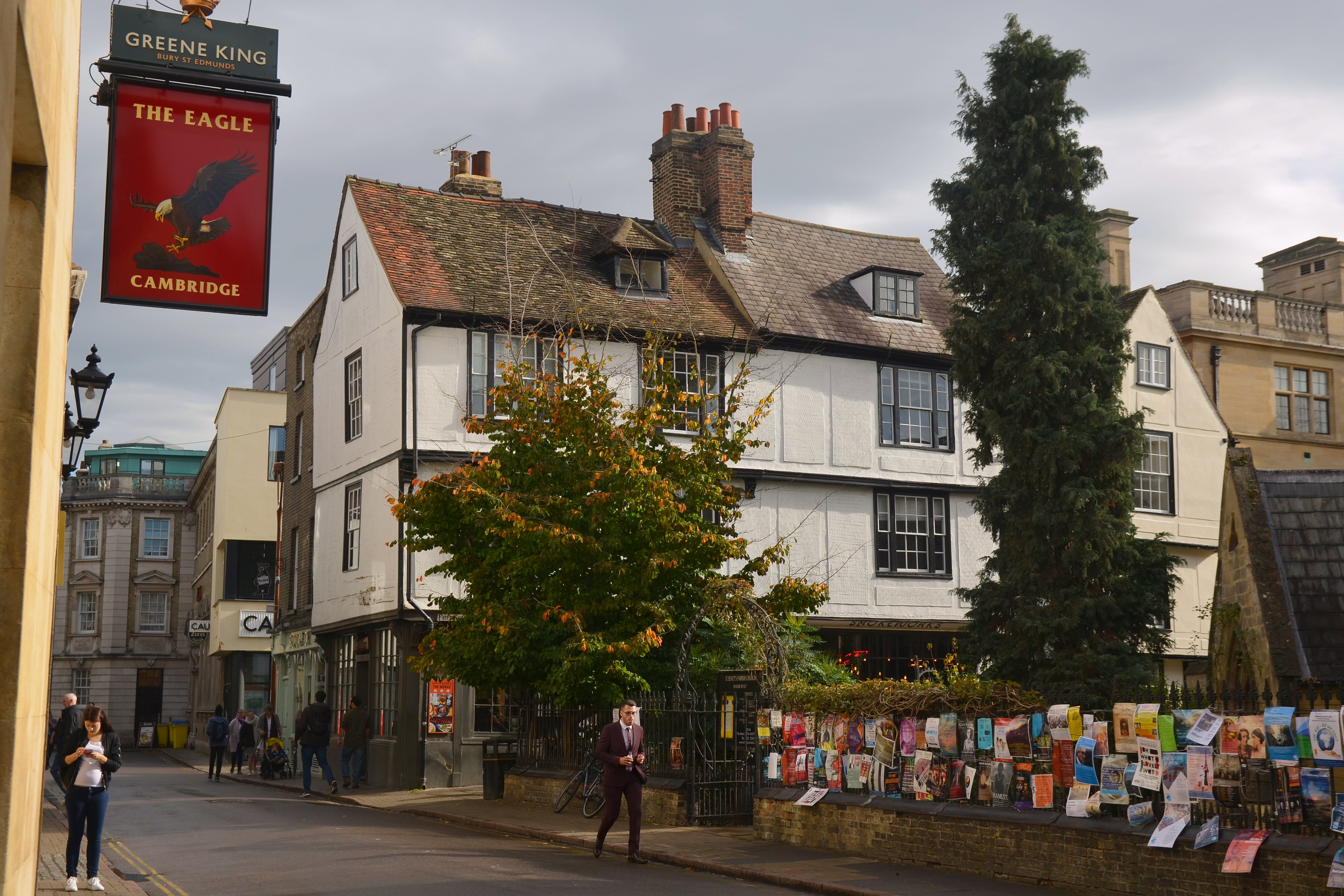
Greer lived in the room next to Clive James at Friar House (white building), Bene't Street, Cambridge.

Drawing on her incongruous but irrepressible skills as a housewife, she had tatted lengths of batik, draped bolts of brocade, swathed silk, swagged satin, niched, ruffed, hemmed and hawed. There were oriental carpets and occidental screens, ornamental plants and incidental music. The effect was stunning. ... Romaine, however, once she had got her life of luxury up and running, did not luxuriate. She had a typewriter the size of a printing press. Instantly she was at it, ten hours a day. Through the lath-and-plaster wall I could hear her attacking the typewriter as if she had a contract, with penalty clauses, for testing it to destruction.

Greer finished her PhD in Calabria, Italy, where she stayed for three months in a village with no running water and no electricity. The trip had begun as a visit with a boyfriend, Emilio, but he ended the relationship so Greer changed her plans. Rising before dawn, she would wash herself at a well, drink black coffee and start typing. She was awarded her PhD in May 1968 for a thesis entitled The Ethic of Love and Marriage in Shakespeare's Early Comedies. Greer - who speaks or reads Latin, Ancient Greek, Italian, French, German and Spanish - had relied on multi-lingual research of European Renaissance comedies to argue that Shakespeare's comedic treatment of marriage represented a departure from European literary norms. Her family did not fly over for the ceremony. "I had worked all my life for love, done my best to please everybody, kept going till I reached the top, looked about and found I was all alone."

The Female Eunuch relies extensively on Greer's Shakespearean scholarship, particularly when discussing the history of marriage and courtship. In 1986 Oxford University Press published her book Shakespeare as part of its Past Masters series, and in 2007 Bloomsbury published her study of Anne Hathaway, Shakespeare's Wife.

== Early career and writing ==
=== Teaching, marriage and television ===
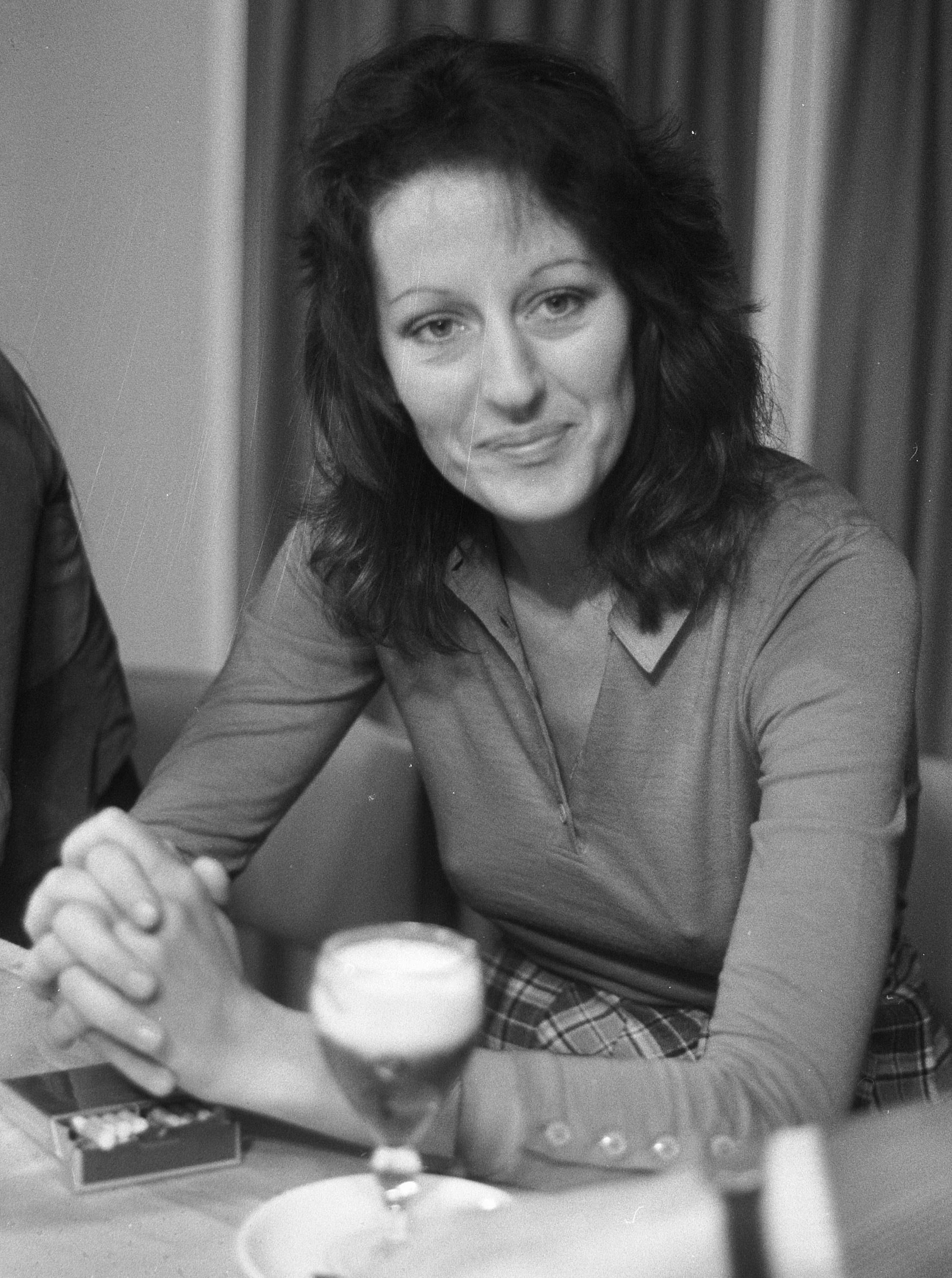
Greer in June 1972

From 1968 to 1972, Greer worked as an assistant lecturer at the University of Warwick in Coventry, living at first in a rented bedsit in Leamington Spa with two cats and 300 tadpoles. In 1968 she was married for the first and only time, a marriage that ended in divorce in 1973. She met Paul du Feu, a King's College London English graduate who was working as a builder, outside a pub in Portobello Road, London, and after a brief courtship they married at Paddington Register Office, using a ring from a pawn shop. Du Feu had already been divorced and had two sons, aged 14 and 16, with his first wife.

The relationship lasted only a few weeks. Apparently unfaithful to du Feu seven times in three weeks of marriage, Greer wrote that she had spent their wedding night in an armchair, because her husband, drunk, would not allow her in bed. Eventually, during a party near Ladbroke Grove, "'[h]e turned to me and sneered (drunk as usual): 'I could have any woman in this room.' 'Except me,' I said, and walked away for ever.'"

In addition to teaching, Greer was trying to make a name for herself in television. In 1967 she appeared in the BBC shows Good Old Nocker and Twice a Fortnight and had a starring role in a short film, Darling, Do You Love Me (1968), by Martin Sharp (the Australian artist and co-editor of Oz magazine) and Bob Whitaker. From 1968 to 1969 she featured in a Granada Television slapstick show, Nice Time, with Kenny Everett, Sandra Gough and Jonathan Routh. One set of outtakes found in Greer's archive at the University of Melbourne features her as a housewife bathing in milk delivered by Everett the milkman. She stated in 1995, that she had wanted to become a mother, but was forced to abandon this due to constant miscarriages.

During her appointment in Coventry, Greer had a dinner with Tom Wolfe and Jim Haynes, immortalized in Wolfe's piece The "Me" Decade and the Third Great Awakening. At one point in the dinner, Greer intentionally set fire to her own hair out of boredom.

=== Oz and Suck ===
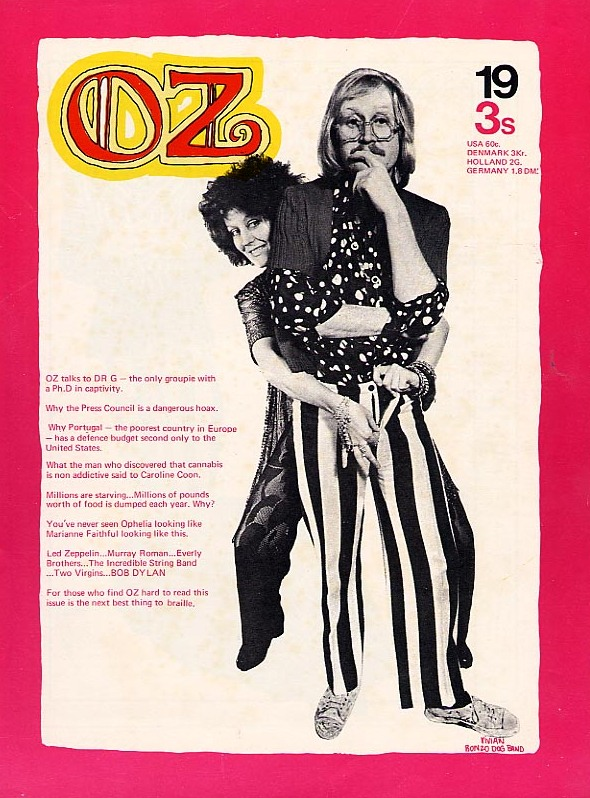
Greer on the cover of Oz magazine, early 1969, with Vivian Stanshall of the Bonzo Dog Doo-Dah Band

Greer began writing columns as "Dr. G" for Oz magazine, owned by Richard Neville, whom she had met at a party in Sydney. The Australian Oz had been shut down in 1963 after three months and the editors convicted of obscenity, later overturned. Neville and his co-editor, Martin Sharp, moved to London and set up Oz there. When Neville met Greer again, he suggested she write for it, which led to her article in the first edition in 1967, "In Bed with the English". Keith Morris photographed her ("Dr G, the only groupie with a PhD in captivity") for issue 19 in early 1969; the black-and-white images include one of her posing for the cover with Vivian Stanshall and another in which she pretends to play the guitar. The July 1970 edition, OZ 29, featured "Germaine Greer knits private parts", an article from Oz's Needlework Correspondent on the hand-knitted Keep it Warm Cock Sock, "a snug corner for a chilly prick". As "Rose Blight", she also wrote a gardening column for Private Eye.

In 1969 Greer was co-founder of an Amsterdam-based pornography magazine, Suck: The First European Sex Paper (1969–1974), along with Bill Daley, Jim Haynes, William Levy, Heathcote Williams and Jean Shrimpton, the stated purpose of which was to create "a new pornography which would demystify male and female bodies". The first issue was reportedly so offensive that Special Branch raided its London office in the Arts Lab in Drury Lane and closed its postbox address.

According to Beatrice Faust, Suck published "high misogynist SM content", including a cover illustration, for issue 7, of a man holding a "screaming woman with her legs in the air while another rapes her anally". One of Greer's biographers, Elizabeth Kleinhenz, wrote that almost nothing was off limits for Suck, including descriptions of child abuse, incest and bestiality. Greer's column, "Sucky Fucky" by "Earth Rose", included advice to women about how to look after their genitals and how they ought to taste their vaginal secretions. She published the name of a friend, someone she knew from her time with the Sydney Push and to whom she later dedicated The Female Eunuch: "Anyone who wants group sex in New York and likes fat girls, contact Lillian Roxon." During a 1970 Amsterdam film festival organized by Suck, the judging panel, which included Greer, gave first prize to Bodil Joensen for a film in which a woman has sex with animals. Suck reproduced one interview with Greer (first published in Screw, another pornographic magazine), entitled "I Am a Whore".

In parallel with her involvement in Suck, Greer told Robert Greenfield of Rolling Stone in January 1971 that she was an admirer of the Redstockings, a radical feminist group founded in New York in January 1969 by Ellen Willis and Shulamith Firestone. Criticised by feminists for her involvement with Suck, in May 1971 she told an interviewer for Screw:

There's a big cleft between sexual liberation and women's liberation. My sisters get mad at me when I say gay liberation is part of our whole movement, and we've got to combine them. They want me to wear pants and be unavailable, and carry a jimmy to bash people over the head with if they feel my ass in the street. They get mad at me for calling myself superwhore, supergroupie, and all that stuff. They think I'm cheapening myself, I'm allowing people to laugh at me, when the whole point is that if my body is sacred and mine to dispose of, then I don't have to build things around it like it was property that could be stolen.

Greer parted company with Suck in 1972 when it published a naked photograph of her lying down with her legs over her shoulders and her face peering between her thighs. The photograph had been submitted on the understanding that nude photographs of all the editors would be published in a book about a film festival. She resigned, accusing the other editors of being "counter-revolutionary". Greer said later that her aim in joining the editorial board had been to try to steer Suck away from exploitative, sadistic pornography.

=== The Female Eunuch (1970) ===
==== Writing ====
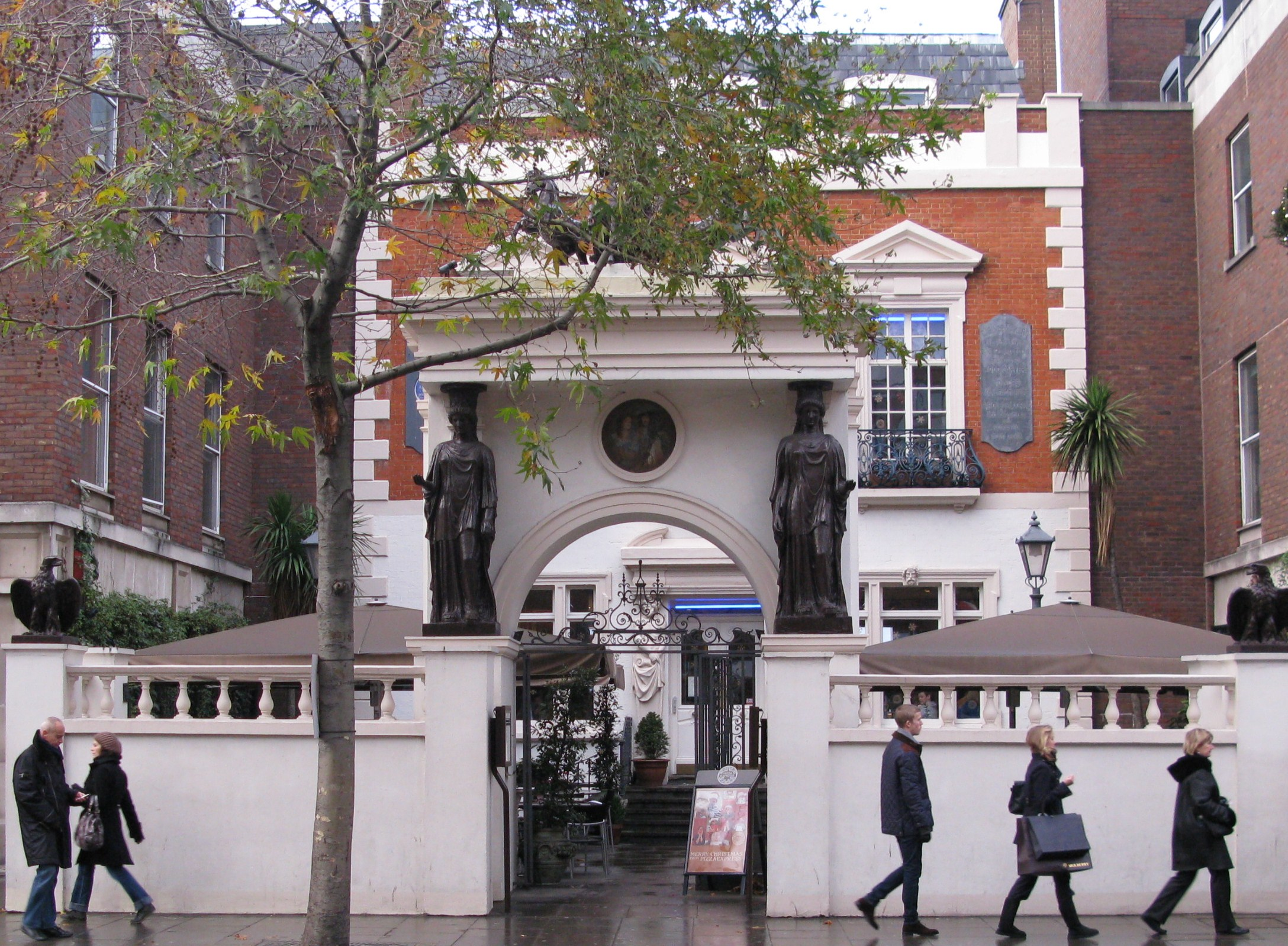
The Pheasantry, 152 King's Road, Chelsea

When she began writing for Oz and Suck, Greer was spending three days a week in her flat in Leamington Spa while she taught at Warwick, two days in Manchester filming, and two days in London in a white-washed bedsit in The Pheasantry on King's Road. When she first moved to London, she had stayed in John Peel's spare room before being invited to take the bedsit in The Pheasantry, a room just under Martin Sharp's; accommodation there was by invitation only.

She was also writing The Female Eunuch. On 17 March 1969 she had had lunch in Golden Square, Soho, with a Cambridge acquaintance, Sonny Mehta of MacGibbon & Kee. When he asked for ideas for new books, she repeated a suggestion of her agent, Diana Crawford, which she had dismissed, that she write about female suffrage. Crawford had suggested that Greer write a book for the 50th anniversary of women (or a portion of them) being given the vote in the UK in 1918. The very idea of it made her angry and she began "raging" about it. "That's the book I want", he said. He advanced her £750 and another £250 when she signed the contract. In a three-page synopsis for Mehta, she wrote: "If Eldridge Cleaver can write a book about the frozen soul of the negro, as part of the progress towards a correct statement of the coloured man's problem, a woman must eventually take steps towards delineating the female condition as she finds it scored upon her sensibility."

Explaining why she wanted to write the book, the synopsis continued: "Firstly I suppose it is to expiate my guilt at being an uncle Tom to my sex. I don't like women. I probably share in all the effortless and unconscious contempt that men pour on women." In a note at the time, she described 21 April 1969 as "the day on which my book begins itself, and Janis Joplin sings at Albert Hall. Yesterday the title was Strumpet Voluntary—what shall it be today?" She told the Sydney Morning Herald in July 1969 that the book was nearly finished and would explore, in the reporter's words, "the myth of the ultra-feminine woman which both sexes are fed and which both end up believing". In February 1970, she published an article in Oz, "The Slag-Heap Erupts", which gave a taste of her views to come, namely that women were to blame for their own oppression. "Men don't really like women", she wrote, "and that is really why they don't employ them. Women don't really like women either, and they too can usually be relied on to employ men in preference to women." Several British feminists, including Angela Carter, Sheila Rowbotham and Michelene Wandor, responded angrily. Wandor wrote a rejoinder in Oz, "On the end of Servile Penitude: A reply to Germaine's cunt power", arguing that Greer was writing about a feminist movement in which she had played no role and about which she knew nothing.

==== Publication ====
Christine Wallace called Paladin's cover, designed by John Holmes, one of the most "instantly recognizable images in post-war publishing".

Launched at a party attended by editors from Oz, The Female Eunuch was published in the UK by MacGibbon & Kee on 12 October 1970, dedicated to Lillian Roxon and four other women. The first print run of 2 1/2 thousand copies sold out on the first day. Arguing that the suburban, consumerist, nuclear family represses and devitalizes women, the book became an international bestseller and a watershed text in the feminist movement. According to Greer, McGraw-Hill paid $29,000 for the American rights and Bantam $135,000 for the paperback. The Bantam edition called Greer the "Saucy feminist that even men like", quoting Life magazine, and the book "#1: the ultimate word on sexual freedom". Demand was such when it was first published that it had to be reprinted monthly, and it has never been out of print. Wallace writes about one woman who wrapped it in brown paper and kept it hidden under her shoes, because her husband would not let her read it. By 1998 it had sold over one million copies in the UK alone.

The year 1970 was an important one for second-wave feminism. In February 400 women met in Ruskin College, Oxford, for Britain's first Women's Liberation Conference. In August Kate Millett's Sexual Politics was published in New York; on 26 August the Women's Strike for Equality was held throughout the United States; and on 31 August Millett's portrait by Alice Neel was on the cover of Time magazine, by which time her book had sold 15,000 copies (although in December Time deemed her disclosure that she was a lesbian as likely to discourage people from embracing feminism). September and October saw the publication of Sisterhood Is Powerful, edited by Robin Morgan, and Shulamith Firestone's The Dialectic of Sex. On 6 March 1971, dressed in a monk's habit, Greer marched through central London with 2,500 women in a Women's Liberation March. By that month The Female Eunuch had been translated into eight languages and had nearly sold out its second printing. McGraw-Hill published it in the United States on 16 April 1971. The toast of New York, Greer insisted on staying at the Hotel Chelsea, a haunt of writers and artists, rather than at the Algonquin Hotel where her publisher had booked her; her book launch had to be rescheduled because so many people wanted to attend. A New York Times book review described her as "[s]ix feet tall, restlessly attractive, with blue-gray eyes and a profile reminiscent of Garbo". Her publishers called her "the most lovable creature to come out of Australia since the koala bear".

A Paladin paperback followed, with cover art by British artist John Holmes, influenced by René Magritte, showing a female torso as a suit hanging from a rail, a handle on each hip. Clive Hamilton regarded it as "perhaps the most memorable and unnerving book cover ever created". Likening the torso to "some fibreglass cast on an industrial production line", Christine Wallace wrote that Holmes's first version was a faceless, breastless, naked woman, "unmistakably Germaine ... hair fashionably afro-frizzed, waist-deep in a pile of stylised breasts, presumably amputated in the creation of a 'female eunuch' based on an assumed equivalence of testicles and mammary glands". The book was reissued in 2001 by Farrar, Straus & Giroux at the instigation of Jennifer Baumgardner, a leading third-wave feminist and editor of the publisher's Feminist Classics series. According to Justyna Wlodarczyk, Greer emerged as "the third wave's favorite second-wave feminist".

==== Arguments ====
"When a woman may walk on the open streets of our cities alone, without insult or obstacle, at any pace she chooses, there will be no further need for this book."

— Germaine Greer, 1969, The Female Eunuch, opening line of the first draft.

The Female Eunuch explores how a male-dominated world affects a female's sense of self, and how sexist stereotypes undermine female rationality, autonomy, power and sexuality. Its message is that women have to look within themselves for personal liberation before trying to change the world. In a series of chapters in five sections—Body, Soul, Love, Hate and Revolution—Greer describes the stereotypes, myths and misunderstandings that combine to produce the oppression. She summarized the book's position in 2018 as "Do what you want and want what you do ... Don't take it up the arse if you don't want to take it up the arse." Wallace argues that this is a libertarian message, with its background in the Sydney Push, rather than one that rose out of the feminism of the day. The first paragraph stakes out the book's place in feminist historiography (in an earlier draft, the first sentence read: "So far the female liberation movement is tiny, privileged and overrated"):

This book is part of the second feminist wave. The old suffragettes, who served their prison term and lived on through the years of gradual admission of women into professions which they declined to follow, into parliamentary freedoms which they declined to exercise, into academies which they used more and more as shops where they could take out degrees while waiting to get married, have seen their spirit revive in younger women with a new and vital cast. ... The new emphasis is different. Then genteel middle-class ladies clamoured for reform, now ungenteel middle-class women are calling for revolution.

The Eunuch ends with: "Privileged women will pluck at your sleeve and seek to enlist you in the 'fight' for reforms, but reforms are retrogressive. The old process must be broken, not made new. Bitter women will call you to rebellion, but you have too much to do. What will you do?"

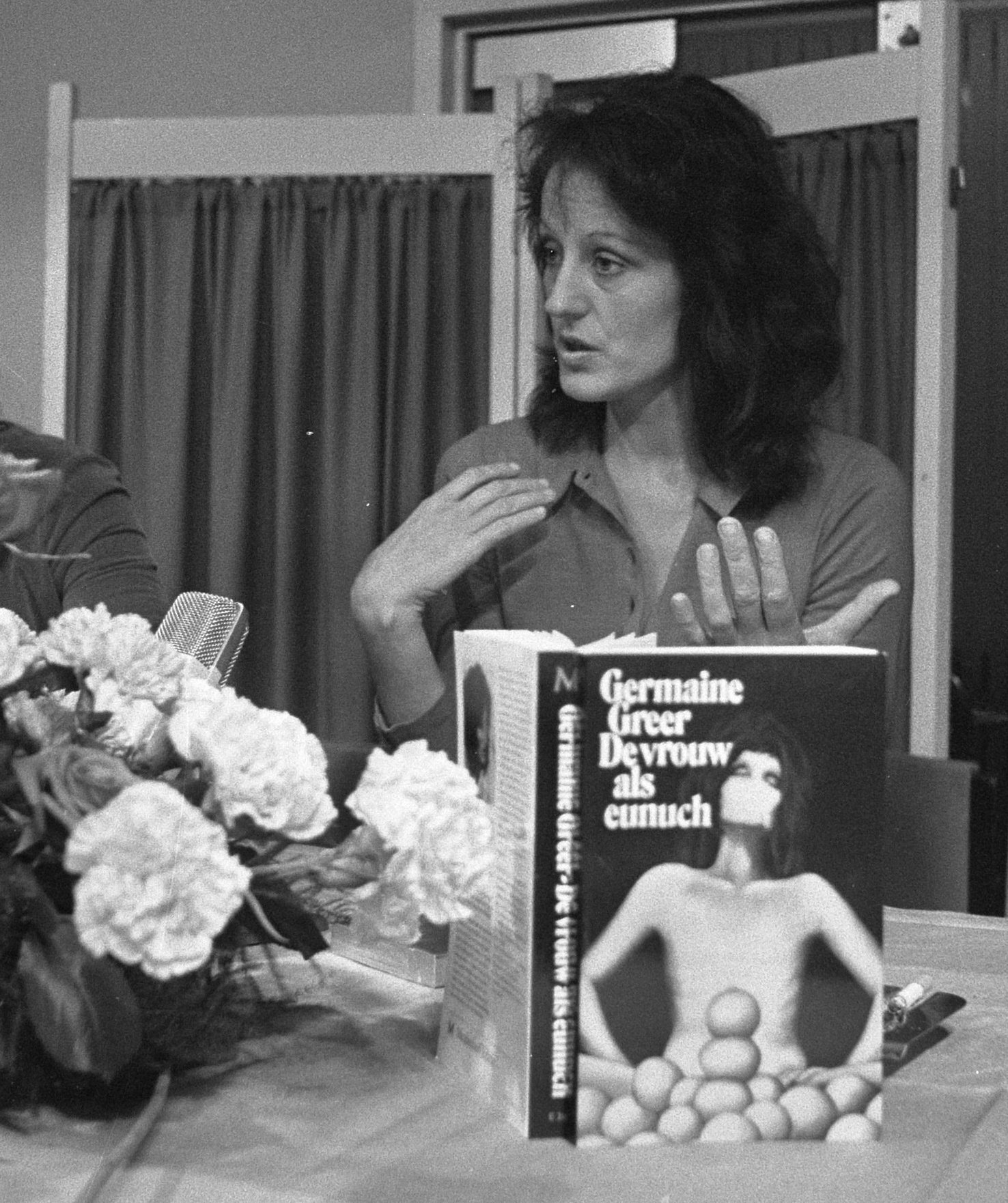
Greer in Amsterdam, 6 June 1972, on a book tour for The Female Eunuch

Two of the book's themes already pointed the way to Sex and Destiny 14 years later, namely that the nuclear family is a bad environment for women and for the raising of children, and that the manufacture of women's sexuality by Western society is demeaning and confining. Girls are feminised from childhood by being taught rules that subjugate them. Later, when women embrace the stereotypical version of adult femininity, they develop a sense of shame about their own bodies, and lose their natural and political autonomy. The result is powerlessness, isolation, a diminished sexuality, and a lack of joy. "Like beasts", she told The New York Times in March 1971, "who are castrated in farming in order to serve their master's ulterior motives—to be fattened or made docile—women have been cut off from their capacity for action." The book argues that "[w]omen have very little idea of how much men hate them", while "[m]en do not themselves know the depth of their hatred." First-wave feminism had failed in its revolutionary aims. "Reaction is not revolution", she wrote. "It is not a sign of revolution where the oppressed adopt the manners of the oppressors and practice oppression on their own behalf. Neither is it a sign of revolution when women ape men ..." The American feminist Betty Friedan, author of The Feminine Mystique (1963), wants for women "equality of opportunity within the status quo, free admission to the world of the ulcer and the coronary", she argued.

Although Greer's book made no use of autobiographical material, unlike other feminist works at the time, Mary Evans, writing in 2002, viewed Greer's "entire oeuvre" as autobiographical, a struggle for female agency in the face of the powerlessness of the feminine (her mother) against the backdrop of the missing male hero (her father). Reviewing the book for The Massachusetts Review in 1972, feminist scholar Arlyn Diamond wrote that, while flawed, it was also "intuitively and brilliantly right", but she criticised Greer for her attitude toward women:

Having convincingly and movingly shown how women are castrated by society, turned into fearful and resentful dependents, she surprisingly spends the rest of her book castigating them as the creators of their own misery. There is a strange confusion here of victim and oppression, so that her most telling insights into women's psychic lives are vitiated by her hatred for those who lead such lives. Feeling that women are crippled in their capacity to love others because they cannot love themselves, she feels that women must despise each other. Perhaps this self-contempt explains the gratuitous nastiness of her cracks about faculty wives, most wives, all those who haven't reached her state of independence, and her willingness to denigrate most of the members of the Women's movement she mentions. ... The lack of "sisterhood" she shows, of love for those who never chose to be eunuchs and who are made miserable by their sense of their own impotence is more than obtuse and unpleasant, it is destructive.

== Celebrity ==
=== Debate with Norman Mailer ===
"She was something to be seen: clad in a black fur jacket and a glamorous floor-length sleeveless dress, the thirty-two-year-old Greer was six feet tall, angular verging on bony, and in possession of a thick crown of frizzed-out black hair. Her style on stage was less performance than poised seduction."

— Carmen Winant, describing Greer in Town Bloody Hall (1979)

In the UK Greer was voted "Woman of the Year" in 1971, and in the US the following year, she was "Playboy Journalist of the Year". Much in demand, she embraced the celebrity life. On 30 April 1971, in "Dialogue on Women's Liberation" at the Town Hall in New York, she famously debated Norman Mailer, whose book The Prisoner of Sex had just been published in response to Kate Millett. Greer presented it as an evening of sexual conquest. She had always wanted to fuck Mailer, she said, and wrote in The Listener that she "half expected him to blow his head off in 'one last killer come' like Ernest Hemingway." Betty Friedan, Sargent Shriver, Susan Sontag and Stephen Spender sat in the audience, where tickets were $25 a head (c. $155 in 2018), while Greer and Mailer shared the stage with Jill Johnston, Diana Trilling and Jacqueline Ceballos. Several feminists declined to attend, including Ti-Grace Atkinson, Kate Millett, Robin Morgan and Gloria Steinem. Filmmakers Chris Hegedus and D. A. Pennebaker captured the event in the documentary Town Bloody Hall (1979).

External media

Images
- In Vogue magazine, photographed by Lord Snowdon, May 1971
- In Life magazine, 7 May 1971

Audio
- This House Supports the Women's Liberation Movement on YouTube, Greer debates William F. Buckley Jr., Cambridge Union, 1973; Greer speaks from 00:13:40 and Buckley from 00:20:15.

Video
- Greer at the Town Hall, New York, 30 April 1971 on YouTube

Wearing a paisley coat she had cut from a shawl and sewn herself, and sitting with her feet on a park bench, Greer appeared on the cover of Life magazine on 7 May 1971, under the title "Saucy Feminist That Even Men Like"; there were five more photographs of her inside. Also in May, she was featured in Vogue magazine, photographed by Lord Snowdon, on the floor in knee-length boots and wearing the same paisley coat. (In 2016 the coat, now in the National Museum of Australia, got its own scholarly article, and the photograph by Lord Snowdon is in the National Portrait Gallery in London.) On 18 May Greer addressed the National Press Club in Washington, the first woman to do so; she was introduced as "an attractive, intelligent, sexually liberated woman". She also appeared on The Dick Cavett Show, and on 14 and 15 June guest-presented two episodes, discussing birth control, abortion and rape.

Greer was in a relationship at the time with Tony Gourvish, manager of the British rock band Family, one that began while she was writing The Female Eunuch. Kleinhenz writes that they lived together for a time, but Greer ended up feeling that he was exploiting her celebrity, a sense she developed increasingly with her friends, according to Kleinhenz. In June 1971 she became a columnist for the London Sunday Times. Later that year her journalism took her to Vietnam, where she wrote about "bargirls" made pregnant by American soldiers, and to Bangladesh, where she interviewed women raped by Pakistani soldiers during the 1971 Bangladesh Liberation War.

=== Tuscany ===
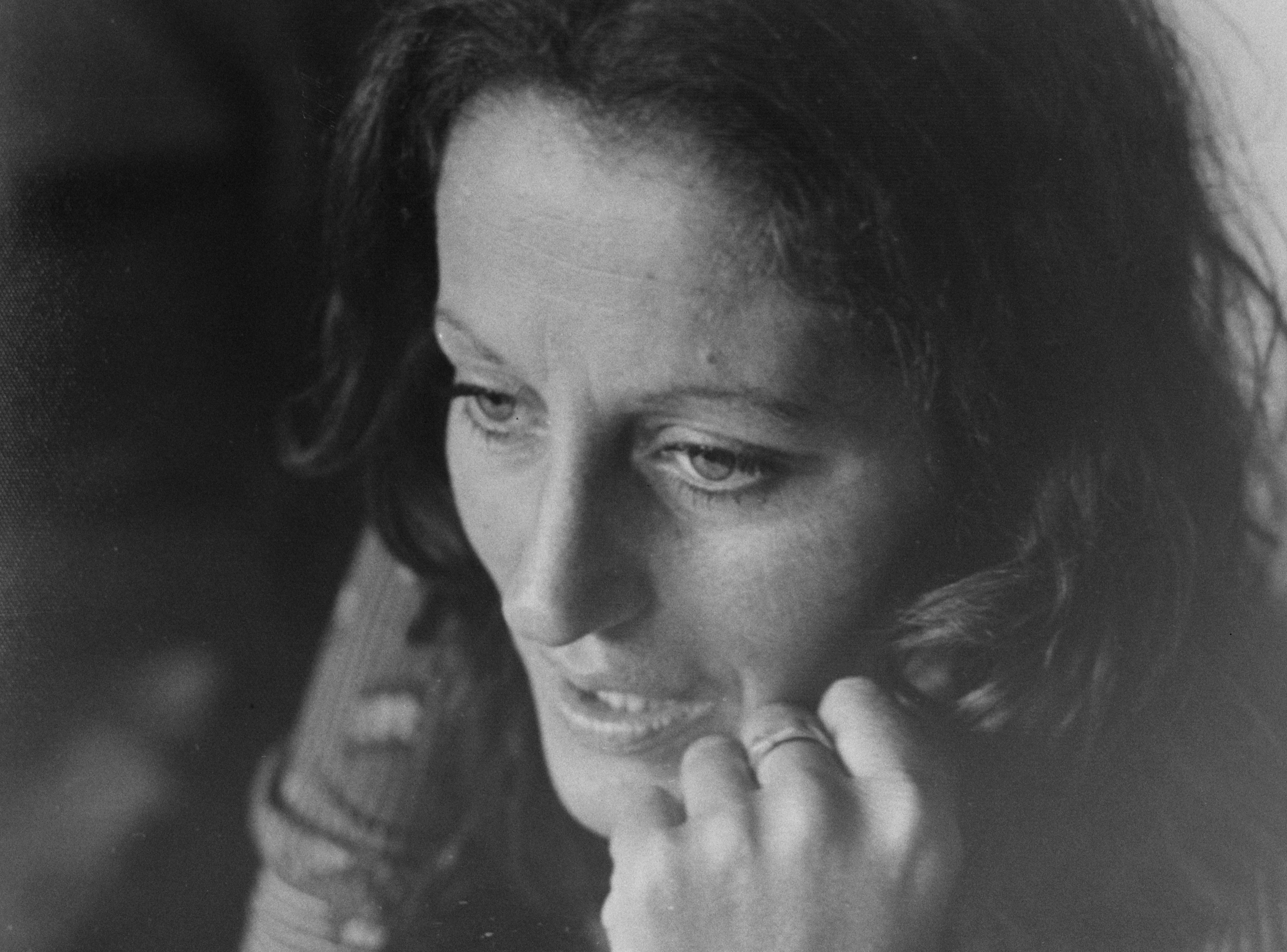
Portrait of Germaine Greer, c.1975

In the summer of 1971, Greer, who speaks fluent Italian, moved to Cortona in Tuscany, where she rented Il Palazzone, a cottage near the town. She later bought a house, Pianelli. She told Richard Neville that she had to spend time away from England because of its tax laws. She spent part of that summer in Porto Cervo, a seaside resort, with Kenneth Tynan, artistic director of the Royal National Theatre, as guests of Michael White, the impresario. The group had dinner one evening with Princess Margaret, Lord Snowdon and Karim Aga Khan. Greer had arrived with little luggage, and before dinner found her hair had been blown about by the wind on the ferry. Princess Margaret sat Greer down at her dressing table and spent five minutes brushing out her hair. The point of the visit for Greer was to discuss Tynan's commission of a translation of Aristophanes's Lysistrata. First performed in 411 BCE, the play explores an attempt by women to force the end of the Peloponnesian War by going on sex strike. The project was not produced; Greer and Tynan fell out during the trip, and Greer left Porto Cervo in tears. Her adaptation of the play found belated appreciation in 1999, when the script was re-worked and produced by Phil Willmott as Germaine Greer's Lysistrata: The Sex Strike. Greer has described the freedom she felt at her home in Italy, which had no electricity when she first moved there. While living in Italy, Greer interviewed Primo Levi, Luciano Pavarotti, and her friend and lover Federico Fellini.

In or around July 1971 Greer was interviewed by Nat Lehrman, a member of Playboy's editorial board, who flew from the United States to Italy to conduct the interview in her home. Playboy published the article in January 1972: "Germaine Greer – a Candid Conversation with the Ballsy Author of The Female Eunuch". It was during this interview that she first discussed publicly that she had been raped in her second year at the University of Melbourne. Busy with her journalism and publicity tours, she resigned her teaching position at Warwick that year. In March 1972, she was arrested in New Zealand for saying "bullshit" and "fuck" in a speech during a tour, which she had done deliberately because Tim Shadbolt (who would later be elected mayor of Invercargill in 1993) had recently been arrested for the same thing. Six hundred people gathered outside the court, throwing jelly beans and eggs at the police. After defending herself, she was "acquitted on 'bullshit' but convicted for 'fuck'", Kleinhenz writes. Given a jail sentence, she offered to pay a fine instead, then left the country without paying it.

In August 1973 Greer debated William F. Buckley Jr. at the Cambridge Union on the motion "This House Supports the Women's Liberation Movement". "Nothing I said", Buckley wrote in 1989, "and memory reproaches me for having performed miserably, made any impression or any dent in the argument. She carried the house overwhelmingly."

Greer, then 37, had an affair in 1976 with the novelist Martin Amis, then 26, which was discussed publicly in 2015 after she sold her archives to the University of Melbourne. In them Margaret Simons discovered a 30,000-word letter to Amis which Greer had begun writing on 1 March 1976 while in the British Airways Monarch lounge at Heathrow Airport, and continued during a lecture tour in the United States, though apparently never sent: "As the miles add up, I find this letter harder and harder to write. My style falters and whole paragraphs emerge as dry as powder. Yesterday I left this book in a taxi cab and would have lost it if the driver hadn't driven back ... with it. As for you, my darling, I see you very rarely. Even in my dreams you send me only your handmaidens."

=== Tulsa ===
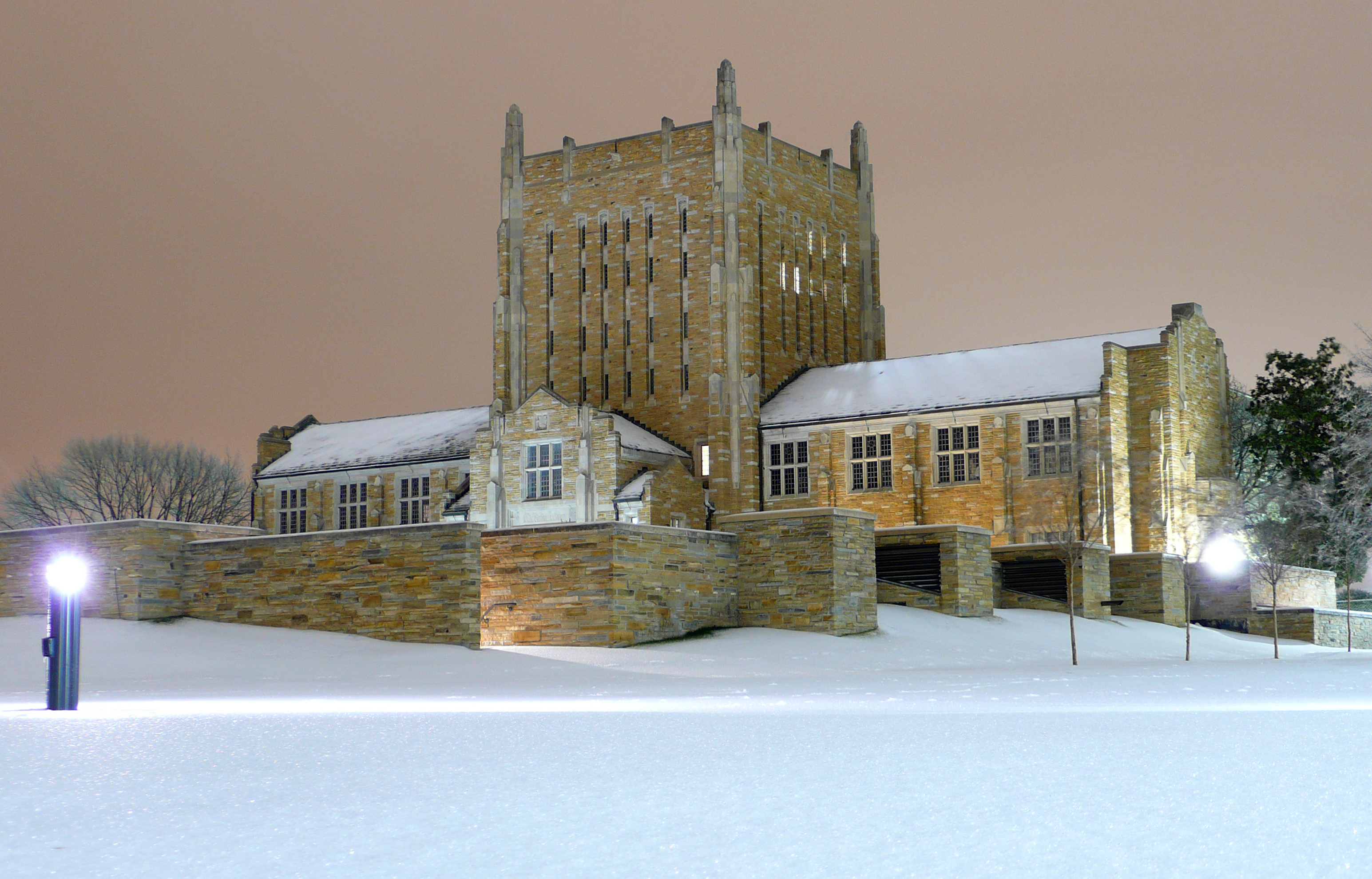
McFarlin Library, University of Tulsa

Greer's second book, The Obstacle Race: The Fortunes of Women Painters and Their Work (1979), covered its subject until the end of the 19th century, and speculated on the existence of female artists whose careers were not recorded. That year Greer was appointed director of the Center of the Study of Women's Literature at the University of Tulsa, Oklahoma, and in 1982 she founded the Tulsa Studies in Women's Literature, an academic journal that highlights unknown or little-known women writers. In the first issue Greer wrote that she wanted the journal to focus on the "rehabilitation of women's literary history". She would spend five months a year in Tulsa and the rest in the UK.

She continued working as a journalist. In 1984 she travelled to Ethiopia to report on the 1983–1985 famine for the Daily Mail and again in April 1985 for The Observer. For the latter, she took photographs with an Olympus automatic camera and drove 700 km to Asosa, a city to which the Ethiopian government was moving people from the famine areas. The Observer did not publish the two 5,000-word articles she submitted; in her view, the editors did not agree with her pro Mengistu government perspective. The New Worker published them instead. In September 1985 she travelled again to Ethiopia, this time to present a documentary for Channel 4 in the UK.

=== Sex and Destiny (1984) ===
Sex and Destiny: The Politics of Human Fertility (1984) continued Greer's critique of Western attitudes toward sexuality, fertility, and family, and the imposition of those attitudes on the rest of the world. Her targets again include the nuclear family, government intervention in sexual behaviour, and the commercialisation of sexuality and women's bodies. She argued that the Western promotion of birth control in the Third World was in large part driven not by concern for human welfare but by the traditional fear and envy of the rich towards the fertility of the poor. The birth control movement had been tainted by such attitudes from its beginning, she wrote, citing Marie Stopes and others. She cautioned against condemning life styles and family values in the developing world.

=== Great Chesterford ===
In 1984 Greer bought The Mills, a Georgian farmhouse on three acres of land in Great Chesterford, Essex, England, where she planted a one-acre wood, which she said made her prouder than anything else she had done, and tried to keep "as a refuge for as many other earthlings" as she could. The Mills was still Greer's home for part of the year when she put it up for sale in 2018; as of 2016 she was spending four months a year in Australia and the rest in the UK.

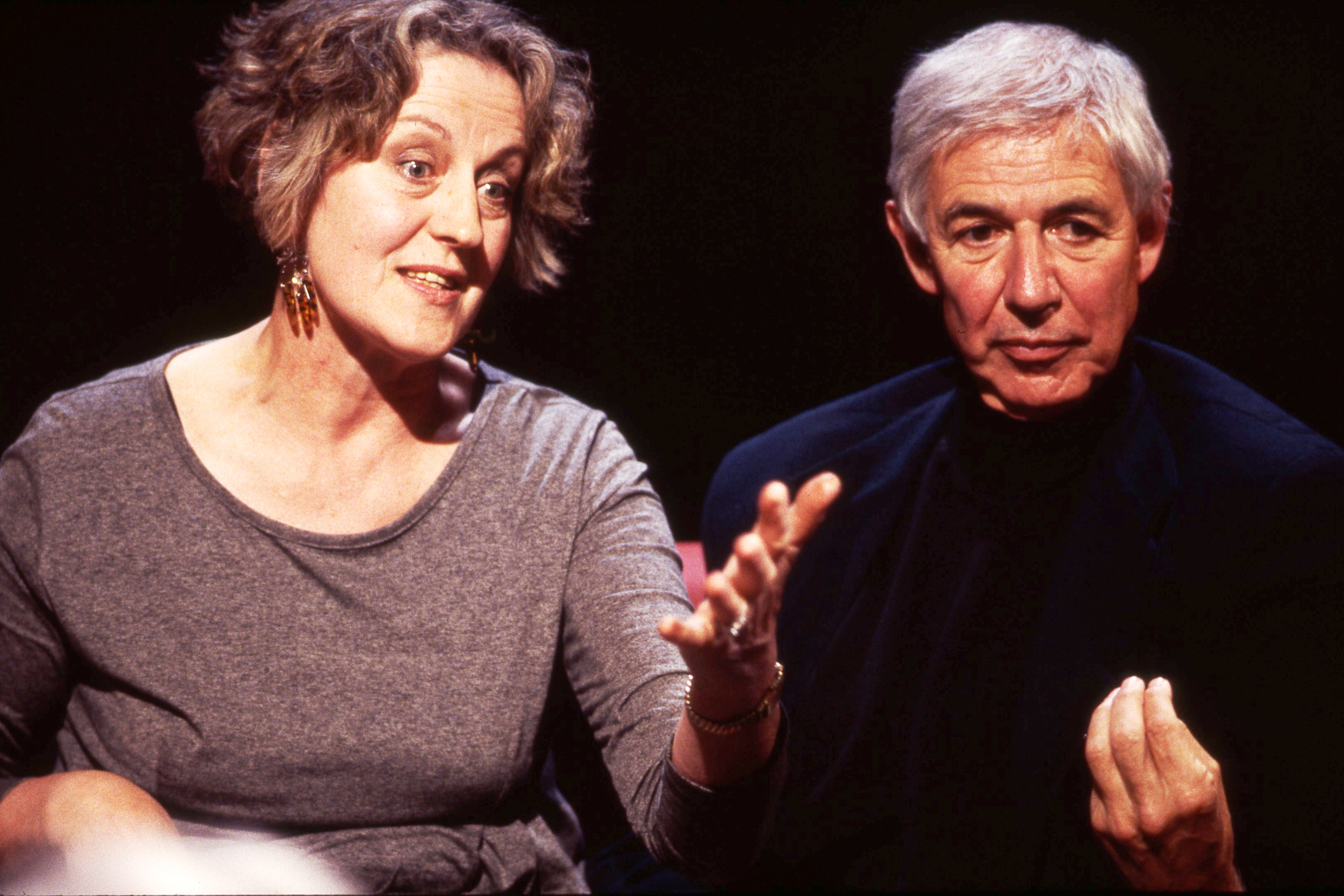
With Lewis Wolpert on Channel 4's After Dark, 1994

Her book Shakespeare (her PhD topic) was published in 1986 by Oxford University Press as part of its Past Masters series. The Madwoman's Underclothes: Essays and Occasional Writings, a collection of her articles written between 1968 and 1985, also appeared that year. In June 1988, along with Harold Pinter, Antonia Fraser, Ian McEwan, Margaret Drabble, Salman Rushdie, David Hare and others, she became part of the "20th of June Group", which supported civil liberties in England that the group felt were being eroded; this was shortly after Section 28 was introduced, which prevented schools from teaching homosexuality as a normal part of family life.

In 1989 she wrote Daddy, We Hardly Knew You, a diary and travelogue about her father, whom Greer portrayed as distant, weak and unaffectionate, which led to the criticism that in her writing she was projecting her relationship with him onto all other men. She became a special lecturer and bye-fellow that year of Newnham College, Cambridge, a position she held until 1998. Greer founded Stump Cross Books, based at The Mills, which published the work of 17th- and 18th-century female poets. She returned to the University of Warwick, accepting a personal Chair as Professor in the English and Comparative Studies department.

She was appearing regularly on television in the UK and Australia during this period, including on the BBC's Have I Got News for You several times from 1990. On 22 July 1995 she was interviewed at length by Andrew Neil on his one-on-one interview show Is This Your Life? In 1998 she wrote an episode, "Make Love not War", for the television documentary series Cold War, and the following year sat for a nude photograph by the Australian photographer Polly Borland. A 1994 interview with Greer in The Big Issue, in which she said she would share her home with anyone willing to follow her rules, was interpreted as an open invitation to the homeless, and led to her being swamped by reporters and low-flying aircraft. One of the journalists, an undercover Mail on Sunday reporter, managed to gain entry and avail himself of her hospitality for two days, which included Greer washing his clothes and teaching him how to bake bread. After the newspaper published a three-page spread, the Press Complaints Commission found it guilty of subterfuge not in the public interest.

== Later writing about women ==
=== The Change (1991 and 2018) ===
Natalie Angier, writing in The New York Times, called The Change: Women, Ageing, and the Menopause (1991) a "brilliant, gutsy, exhilarating, exasperating fury of a book ... tantalizingly close to being a potential feminist classic on a par with The Female Eunuch." In it, Greer writes of the myths about menopause—or as she prefers to call it the "climacteric", or critical period. "Frightening females is fun", she wrote in The Age in 2002. "Women were frightened into using hormone replacement therapy by dire predictions of crumbling bones, heart disease, loss of libido, depression, despair, disease and death if they let nature take its course." She argues that scaring women is "big business and hugely profitable". The book, including the medical information, was updated and reissued in 2018.

=== Slip-Shod Sibyls (1995) ===
Slip-Shod Sibyls: Recognition, Rejection and the Woman Poet (1995) is an account of women who wrote poetry in English before 1900, and an examination of why so few have been admitted to the literary canon. Her conclusion is that women were held to lower standards than men (hence the "slip-shod" sibyls of the title, quoting Alexander Pope), and the poetic tradition discouraged good poetry from women. The book includes a critique of the concept of woman as Muse, associated with Robert Graves and others; a chapter on Sappho and her use as a symbol of female poetry; a chapter on the 17th-century poet Katherine Philips; two chapters on Aphra Behn and one on Anne Wharton; and material on Anne Finch, Letitia Landon and Christina Rossetti. It includes an epilogue on 20th-century female poets and their propensity for suicide: "Too many of the most conspicuous figures in women's poetry of the 20th century not only destroyed themselves in a variety of ways but are valued for poetry that documents that process."

=== The Whole Woman (1999) ===
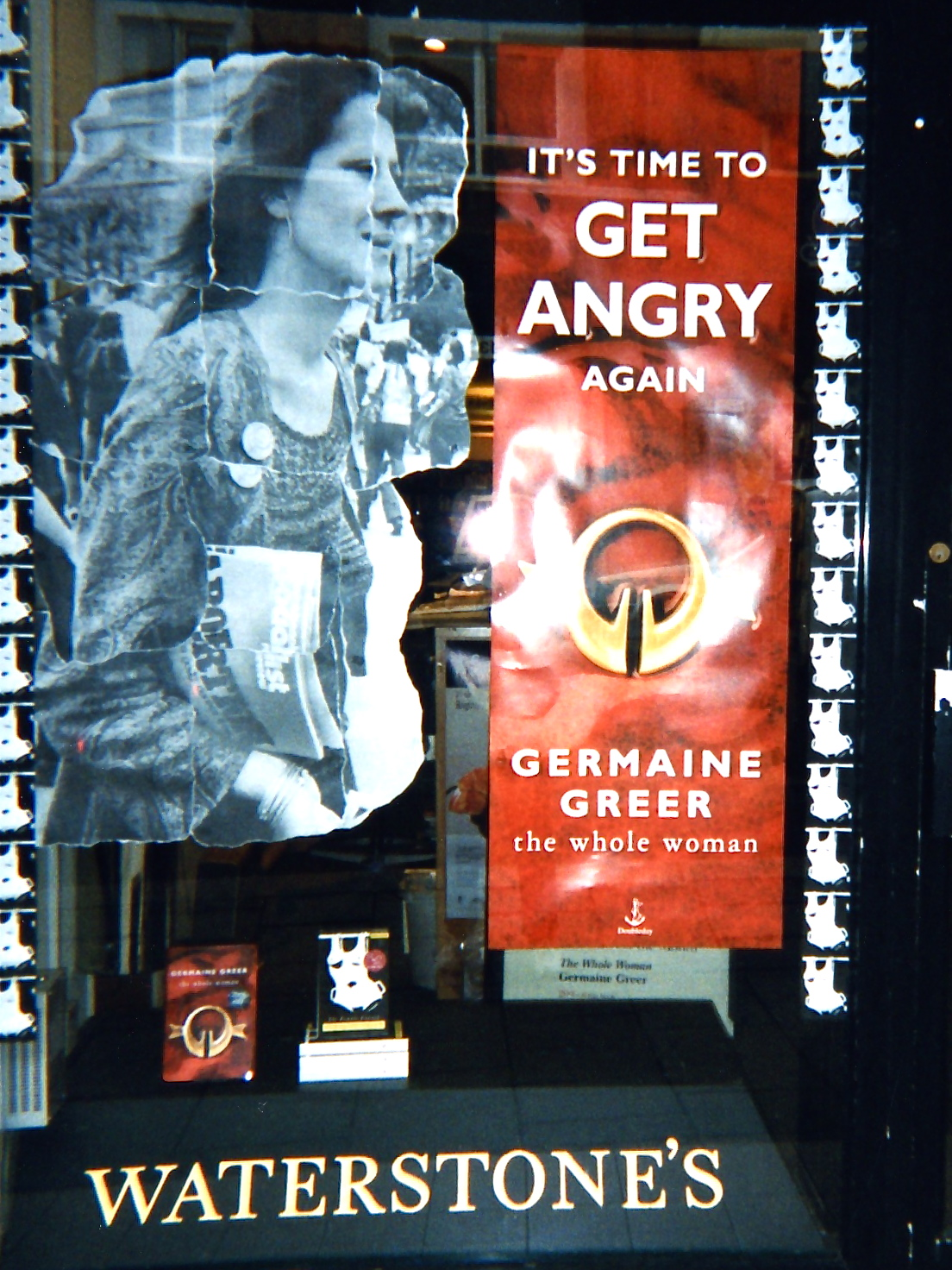
Display in the window of a Waterstone's book store for the launch of The Whole Woman

A sequel to The Female Eunuch, The Whole Woman was published in 1999 by Doubleday, one of seven publishers who bid for the book; Greer was paid an advance of £500,000. In the book Greer argued that feminism had lost its way. Women still faced the same physical realities as before, but because of changing views about gender identity and post-modernism, there is a "new silence about [women's] visceral experiences [that] is the same old rapist's hand clamped across their mouths". She wrote: "Real women are being phased out; the first step, persuading them to deny their own existence, is almost complete."

Even if it had been real, equality would have been a poor substitute for liberation; fake equality is leading women into double jeopardy. The rhetoric of equality is being used in the name of political correctness to mask the hammering that women are taking. When The Female Eunuch was written our daughters were not cutting or starving themselves. On every side speechless women endure endless hardship, grief and pain, in a world system that creates billions of losers for every handful of winners. It's time to get angry again.

Her comments on female genital mutilation (FGM) proved controversial, particularly that opposition to it is an "attack on cultural identity", just as outlawing male circumcision would be viewed as an attack on Jews and Muslims. Greer wrote that feminists fighting to eliminate FGM in their own countries should be supported, but she explored the complexities of the issue and the double standards of the West regarding other forms of bodily mutilation, including that the American Academy of Pediatrics recommended surgery at that time on baby girls with clitorises over three-eighths of an inch long. She questioned the view that FGM is imposed by men on women, rather than by women on women, or even freely chosen.

=== On gender ===
==== Sex-gender distinction ====
In The Whole Woman, Greer argued that, while sex is a biological given, gender roles are cultural constructs. Femininity is not femaleness. "Genuine femaleness remains grotesque to the point of obscenity", she wrote. Girls and women are taught femininity—learning to speak softly, wear certain clothes, remove body hair to please men, and so on—a process of conditioning that begins at birth and continues throughout the entire life span. "There is nothing feminine about being pregnant", she told Krishnan Guru-Murthy in 2018. "It's almost the antithesis of that. There's nothing feminine about giving birth. It's a bloody struggle, and you've got to be strong and brave. There's nothing feminine about breastfeeding. God knows it drives everybody mad; they want to see nice big pumped-up tits, but they don't want to see them doing their job."

==== Transgender identity ====
In a 1989 issue of the Independent, she published "On Why Sex Change is a Lie", an essay in which she recalled a 1971 encounter with someone she perceived as a trans woman. She referred to this person as "it" and "him"; called her a "gross parody of my sex" who should not be allowed to "come to the lavatory with me" or possess a "female passport"; and said that when this person "grabbed my hand" to say "thank you," she did so with a "paw" with a "rapist's grip."

In 1997, she said it was "disgraceful" that Newnham College had recently granted a fellowship to physicist Rachael Padman, a trans woman who had transitioned in the early 1980s during her PhD. Cambridge University explained that, "since the early 1970s", whenever the university was aware of someone requesting privacy for their gender transition, it had been a university-wide practice for the administration to maintain their privacy and respect the gender in which they lived. Greer argued that since Padman had been born male, the women-only college had "driven a coach and horses through our statutes" by admitting her.

In 1999, in a chapter in The Whole Woman entitled "Pantomime Dames", she wrote: "Governments that consist of very few women have hurried to recognise as women, men who believe that they are women and have had themselves castrated to prove it, because they see women not as another sex but as a non-sex."

She reiterated her views several times over the following years, (Note: Greer repeated her views in 2016 on an episode of Australia's Q&A, and in 2018 on Channel 4's Genderquake debate in the UK.) including in 2015 when students at Cardiff University tried unsuccessfully to "no platform" her to stop her from speaking on "Women & Power: The Lessons of the 20th Century". Greer responded by reaffirming, during an interview with Kirsty Wark for BBC Newsnight, that she did not regard transgender women as women; she argued that the nomination of Caitlyn Jenner for Glamour Woman of the Year had been misogynist. Over 130 academics and others signed a letter to The Observer in 2015 objecting to the use of no-platform policies against Greer and feminists with similar views; signatories included Beatrix Campbell, Mary Beard, Deborah Cameron, Catherine Hall, Liz Kelly, Ruth Lister, and the Southall Black Sisters.

=== On rape ===
==== Arguments ====
Greer wrote in The Female Eunuch (1970) that rape is not the "expression of uncontrollable desire" but an act of "murderous aggression, spawned in self-loathing and enacted upon the hated other". She has argued since at least the 1990s that the criminal justice system's approach to rape is male-centred, treating female victims as evidence rather than complainants, and reflecting that women were once regarded as male property. "Historically, the crime of rape was committed not against the woman but against the man with an interest in her, her father or her husband", she wrote in 1995. "What had to be established beyond doubt was that she had not collaborated with the man who usurped another's right. If she had, the penalty, which might have been stoning or pressing to death, was paid by her."

"If we adopt a female-centred view of the offence, can we really argue that a raped woman is ruined or undone? She may be outraged and humiliated, but she cannot be damaged in any essential way by the simple fact of the presence of an unwelcome penis in her vagina."

— Germaine Greer, The Guardian, 6 March 1995.

Rape is not the worst thing that can happen to a woman, she writes; if a woman allows a man to have sex with her to avoid a beating, then arguably she fears the beating more. A woman who has been raped has no reason to feel shame (and therefore no need for anonymity), and a female-centred view of rape will not fashion it as something that can "ruin" a woman. "She may be outraged and humiliated", Greer writes, "but she cannot be damaged in any essential way by the simple fact of the presence of an unwelcome penis in her vagina." If a woman feels she has been destroyed by such an attack, "it is because you've been told lies about who and what you are", she argued in 2018. She suggested in 1995 that the crime of rape be replaced by one of sexual assault with varying degrees of seriousness and swifter outcomes. In 2018 she said she had changed her mind about calling rape "sexual assault", because most rape (in particular, sex without consent within marriage) is not accompanied by physical violence. "There is no way that the law of rape fits the reality of women's lives", she said in 2018. Her book, On Rape, was published by Melbourne University Press in September 2018.

==== Personal experience ====
During an interview with Playboy in 1971, and again during an interview with Clyde Packer in the 1980s, Greer discussed how she had been raped as an undergraduate at the University of Melbourne. Two weeks after her March 1995 Guardian column about rape provoked controversy, she again recalled her own experience, which took place in January 1958 when she was 19. A rugby player she had met at a barbecue dragged her into a car, punched her several times in the head, forced her to repeat what he wanted her to say, then raped her. Afterwards, he walked back to the party as though nothing had happened. Her male flatmates found her at home hours later, bruised, swollen and semi-conscious. She believed that reporting it would be pointless; she had danced with him at the party, had left with him voluntarily, and he was a pillar of the community. The flatmates brought the man to the flat days later and warned him in front of her that they would break his legs if they saw him at any of the places they frequented.

She argued, in two Guardian columns, that it was not the rapist's penis that had hurt her, but his fists and "vicious mind", and the loss of control, invasion of self, and "being made to speak the rapist's script". "To insist", she wrote, "that outrage by penis is worse than outrage by any other means is to glorify and magnify that tag of flesh beyond reason." She suggested that perhaps women should "out" their rapists rather than take a chance with a legal system that does not work for them. Her views were strongly criticised by Women Against Rape, which at the time was campaigning for more prosecutions.

=== Me Too movement ===
Greer has commented several times on the Me Too movement. In November 2017, she called for women to show solidarity when other women are sexually harassed. Just before she was named Australian of the Year in Britain in January 2018, she said she had always wanted to see women react immediately to sexual harassment, as it occurs. "What makes it different is when the man has economic power, as Harvey Weinstein has. But if you spread your legs because he said 'be nice to me and I'll give you a job in a movie' then I'm afraid that's tantamount to consent, and it's too late now to start whingeing about that." In May that year, she argued—of the high-profile cases—that disclosure was "dishonourable" because women who "claim to have been outraged 20 years ago" had been paid to sign non-disclosure agreements, but then had spoken out once the statute of limitations had lapsed and they had nothing to lose.

== Other work ==
=== The Boy (2003) ===
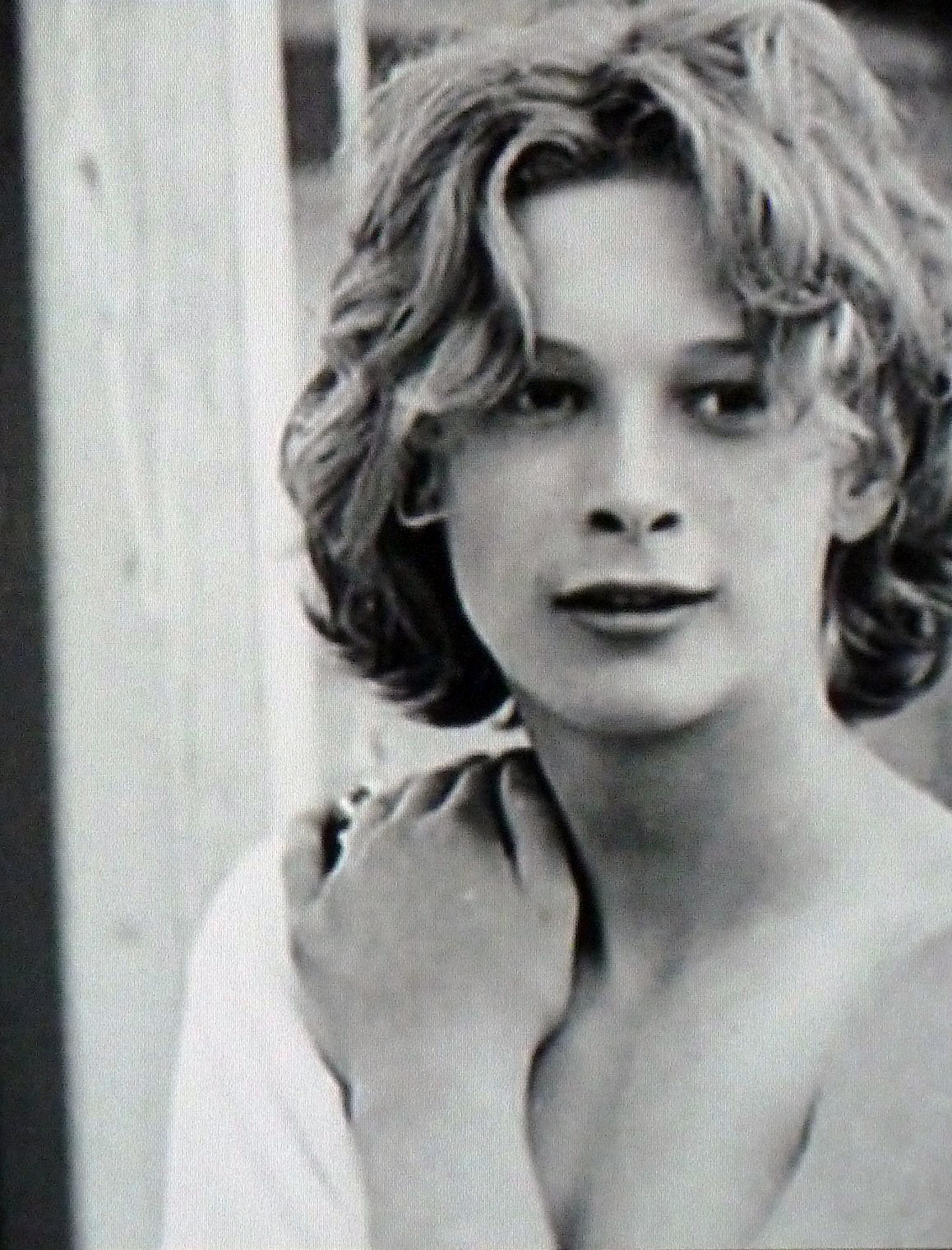
Björn Andrésen was featured on the cover of The Boy

A book of art history, The Boy (2003) — published in the United States as The Beautiful Boy —, was illustrated with 200 photographs of what The Observer called "succulent teenage male beauty". Greer described the book as an attempt to address modern women's apparent indifference to the teenage boy as a sexual object and to "advance women's reclamation of their capacity for, and right to, visual pleasure". (Note: In the book's opening pages, Greer writes: "Most people have accepted without question that women are treated as sex objects, viewed principally as body, with a primary duty to attract male attention. Though this is clearly true, it is also true that women are at the same time programmed for failure in their duty of attraction, because boys do it better. This is not good news for men, because a boy is a boy for only a very brief space. He has to be old enough to be capable of sexual response but not yet old enough to shave. This window of opportunity is not only narrow, it is mostly illegal. The male human is beautiful when his cheeks are still smooth, his body hairless, his head full-maned, his eyes clear, his manner shy and his belly flat.")

The cover photograph, by David Bailey, was of 15-year-old Björn Andrésen in his character of Tadzio in the film Death in Venice (1971). The actor complained about Greer's use of the photograph, saying it was used without his permission and was disturbed by the contents of the book. He stated "Adult love for adolescents is something that I am against in principle... Emotionally perhaps, and intellectually, I am disturbed by it—because I have some insight into what this kind of love is about." Some writers characterised the book's nature as paedophilic, with Greer herself admitting that she expected to be called a paedophile after publication.

=== "Whitefella Jump Up" (2003) ===
Greer has published several essays on Aboriginal issues, including "Whitefella Jump Up: The Shortest Way to Nationhood", first published in Quarterly Essay in August 2003, and later as a book in the UK. In the essay she wrote that she had understood little about Aboriginal issues in her early years, but in England she saw from the perspective of distance that "what was operating in Australia was apartheid". On returning to Australia in late 1971 she made an effort "to see as much as I could of what had been hidden from me", travelling through the Northern Territory with activist Bobbi Sykes.

Greer argued that Australians should re-imagine the country as an Aboriginal nation. "Jump up" in Australian Kriol can, she wrote, mean "to be resurrected or reborn"; the title refers to occasions when Aboriginal people apparently accepted whites as reincarnated relatives. Suggesting that whites were mistaken in understanding this literally, she argued that Aboriginal people were offering whites terms on which they could be accepted into the Aboriginal kinship system. Greer suggests that the alienation so central to contemporary Australian culture arises in part from deep-seated white guilt at having stolen a continent from the original inhabitants. The essay argues that it may not be too late for Australia as a nation to root itself in Aboriginal history and culture, specifically adopting the values of sharing and care for the environment. She wrote:

Though I can claim no drop of Aboriginal blood, twenty years ago Kulin women from Fitzroy adopted me. There are whitefellas who insist that blackfellas don't practise adoption; all I can say is that when I asked about the possibility of assuming Aboriginality, the Kulin women said at once 'We'll adopt you.' 'How do you do that?' I asked, hoping I wouldn't be required to camp in some bleak spot for a month or two, and be painted or smoked and cut about. 'That's it,' they said. 'It's done. We've adopted you.' Since then I have sat on the ground with black women and been assigned a skin and been taught how to hunt and how to cook shellfish and witchetty grubs, with no worse punishment for getting it wrong than being laughed at.

Greer's essay On Rage (2008) dealt with the widespread rage of Indigenous men. Aboriginal academic Marcia Langton argued that she was making excuses for bad behaviour. Greer returned that year to Newnham College, Cambridge, as a special supervisor.

=== White Beech (2013) ===
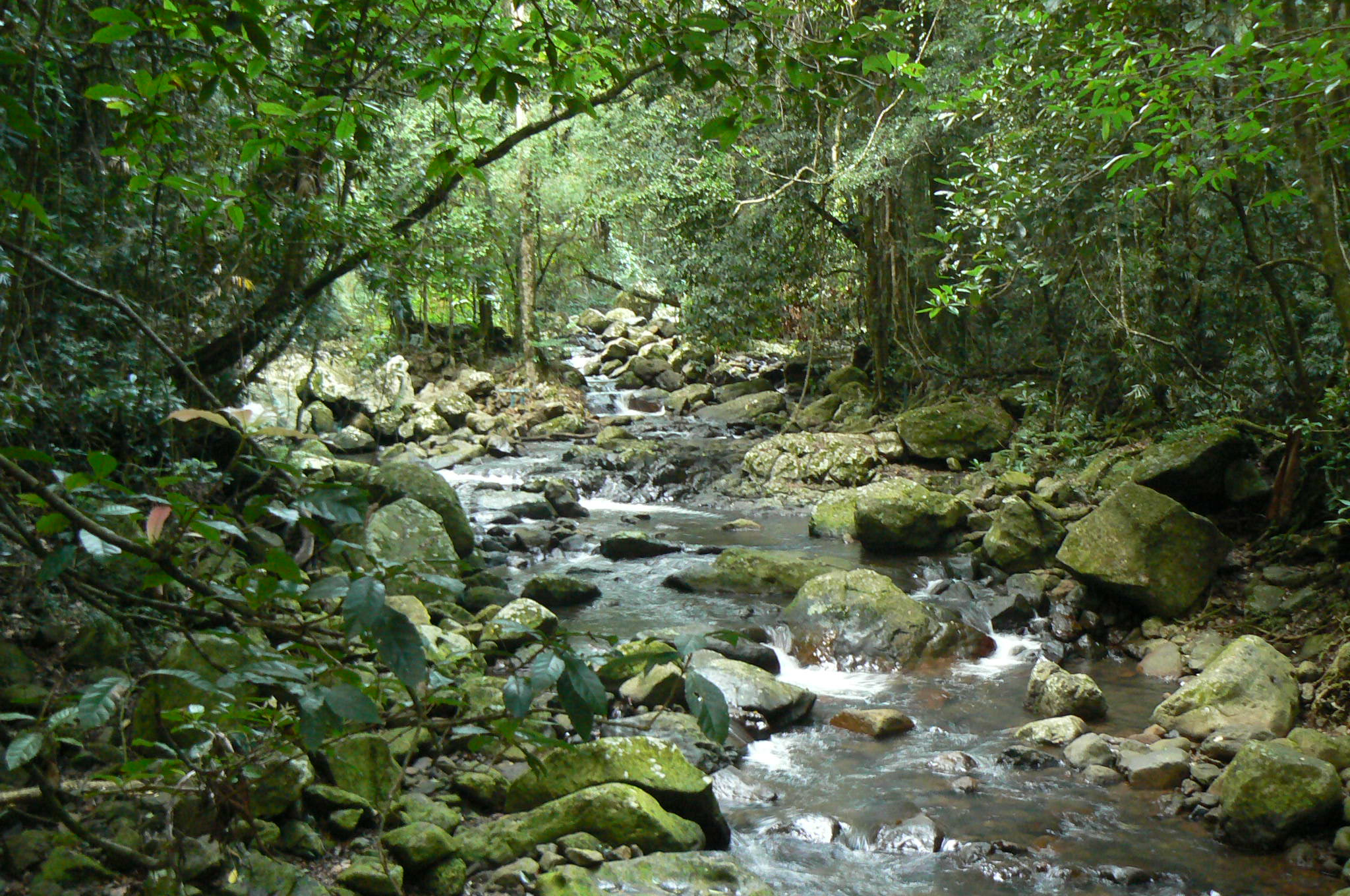
Cave Creek, near Natural Bridge, Queensland

In 2001 Greer bought 60 hectares (150 acres) of land in Australia for $500,000 at Cave Creek in the Numinbah Valley, near the Natural Bridge section of Springbrook National Park in South East Queensland. Formerly rainforest, the land had been used as a dairy farm, banana plantation and timber source. In 2013 she published White Beech: The Rainforest Years about her Cave Creek Rainforest Rehabilitation Scheme, her effort to restore the land to its pre-European-settler state. Friends of Gondwana Rainforest, a charity Greer registered in England in 2011, funds and oversees the project.

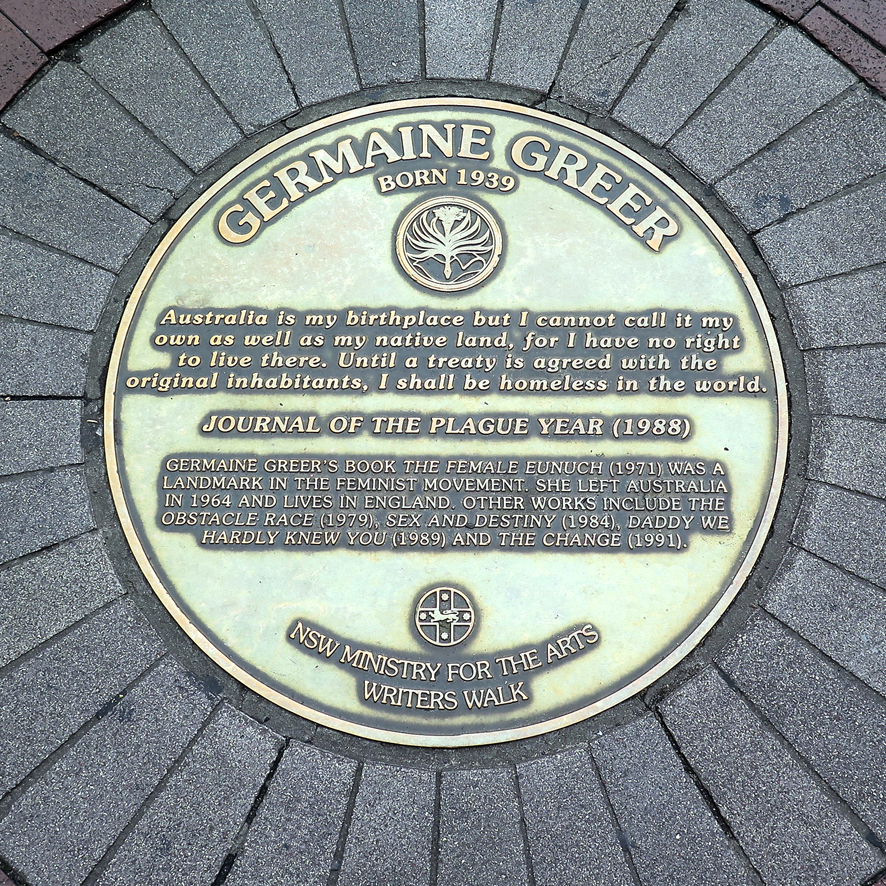
Plaque on the Sydney Writers Walk: "Australia is my birthplace but I cannot call it my own as well as my native land, for I have no right to live there. Until a treaty is agreed with the original inhabitants, I shall be homeless in the world."

The book describes about how she discovered an uncommon White Beech tree (Gmelina leichhardtii), and that the chemical 2,4,5-T (an Agent Orange ingredient) had been sprayed in the area for years to thin the hardwood and control the weeds. She wrote that "entering fully into the multifarious life that is Earthling's environment, while giving up delusions of controlling it, is a transcendental experience". Her sense of space, time and self changed: "My horizons flew away, my notion of time expanded and deepened, and my self disappeared." Although she divides time between Australia and England annually, she will not settle permanently in Australia until the country has a treaty with its indigenous people.

== Awards and honours ==
External images
- Germaine Greer portraits
- Bryan Wharton (1969)
- Polly Borland (1999)
- Australian stamp (2011)

Greer has received several honorary doctorates: a Doctor of Letters from York University in 1999, a Doctor of Laws from the University of Melbourne in 2003, a Doctor of Letters at Anglia Ruskin University in 2003, and a Doctor of Letters from the University of Sydney in 2005.

The National Portrait Gallery in London has purchased eight photographs of Greer, including by Bryan Wharton, Lord Snowdon and Polly Borland, and one painting by Paula Rego. She was selected as an Australian National Living Treasure in 1997, and in 2001 was inducted into the Victorian Honour Roll of Women. In 2011 she was one of four feminist "Australian legends" (along with Eva Cox, Elizabeth Evatt and Anne Summers) represented on Australian postage stamps. In the UK she was voted "Woman of the Year" in 1971, and in 2016 BBC Radio 4's Woman's Hour placed her fourth on its annual "Power List" of seven women who had the biggest impact on women's lives over the previous 70 years, alongside (in order) Margaret Thatcher, Helen Brook, Barbara Castle, Jayaben Desai, Bridget Jones, and Beyoncé. Also in 2016 she was elected a Fellow of the Royal Society of Literature.

== Controversial views ==
Writer Yvonne Roberts referred to Greer as "the contrarian queen". Sarah Ditum wrote that Greer "doesn't get into trouble occasionally or inadvertently, but consistently and with the attitude of a tank rolling directly into a crowd of infantry". The Sydney Morning Herald has labelled her a "human headline". British actor and comedian Tracey Ullman has portrayed Greer as an elderly woman picking fights at bus stops. In response to criticism of Greer, Polly Toynbee wrote in 1988: "Small minds, small spirits affronted by the sheer size and magnetism of the woman."

Greer said that the 1989 fatwa against Salman Rushdie for his novel The Satanic Verses (1988) was his own fault, although she also added her name that year to a petition in his support. In 2006, she supported activists trying to halt the filming in London's Brick Lane of the film Brick Lane (based on Monica Ali's novel of the same name) because, she wrote, "a proto-Bengali writer with a Muslim name" had portrayed Bengali Muslims as "irreligious and disorderly". Rushdie called her comments "philistine, sanctimonious, and disgraceful, but ... not unexpected".

In May 1995, in her column for The Guardian (which the newspaper refused), she referred to Guardian journalist Suzanne Moore's "bird's nest hair" and "fuck-me shoes". She called her biographer, Christine Wallace, a "flesh-eating bacterium" and Wallace's book, Untamed Shrew (1999), "a piece of excrement". (She has said "I fucking hate biography. If you want to know about Dickens, read his fucking books.") Australia, she said in 2004, was a "cultural wasteland"; the Australian prime minister, John Howard, called her remarks patronising and condescending. After receiving a fee of £40,000, she left the Celebrity Big Brother house on day six in 2005 because, she wrote, it was a squalid "fascist prison camp". Kevin Rudd, later Australia's prime minister, told her to "stick a sock in it" in 2006, when, in a column about the death of Australian Steve Irwin, star of The Crocodile Hunter, she concluded that the animal world had "finally taken its revenge". She criticised the wife of the newly elected American president Barack Obama, Michelle Obama, for her dress on the night of the 2008 U.S. election, and in 2012 she advised Australia's first female prime minister, Julia Gillard, to change the cut of her jackets because she had "a big arse".

On Andrew Denton's television talk show Enough Rope, Denton quoted Greer as having said to the Sydney Morning Herald that, "A woman of taste is a pederast—boys rather than men", a quote she confirmed.

== Later life ==
In 2021, Greer returned to Australia to sell her home and put herself into aged care in Castlemaine, Victoria. She stayed 10 months and left in April 2022 to live with her brother. She described herself as having been "not a patient, but an inmate" at the aged-care home. She noted that more women are in care than men and said residential aged care was a pressing feminist issue. In June 2022, Greer was among the women highlighted in the Australian Women Changemakers exhibition at the Museum of Australian Democracy.

== Germaine Greer archive ==
Greer sold her archive in 2013 to the University of Melbourne. As of June 2018 it covers the period 1959–2010, filling 487 archive boxes on 82 metres of shelf space. The transfer of the archive (150 filing-cabinet drawers) from Greer's home in England began in July 2014; the university announced that it was raising A$3 million to fund the purchase, shipping, housing, cataloguing and digitising. Greer said that her receipt from the sale would be donated to her charity, Friends of Gondwana Rainforest.

Index cards that contain Greer family tree information, compiled when she was researching her book Daddy, We Hardly Knew You, are held by the State Library of Victoria.

== See also ==
- Anarchism in Australia

== Selected works ==
- (1963). The Development of Byron's Satiric Mode (MA). University of Sydney. hdl:2123/13500.
- (1968). The Ethic of Love and Marriage in Shakespeare's Early Comedies (PDF) (PhD thesis). University of Cambridge. EThOS uk.bl.ethos.599683.
- (1970). The Female Eunuch. London: MacGibbon & Kee.
- (1979) as Rose Blight. The Revolting Garden. HarperCollins.
- (1979). The Obstacle Race: The Fortunes of Women Painters and Their Work. London: Martin Secker and Warburg.
- (1984). Sex and Destiny: The Politics of Human Fertility. London: Harper & Row.
- (1986). Shakespeare. Oxford: Oxford University Press (Past Masters series).
- (1986). The Madwoman's Underclothes: Essays and Occasional Writings. London: Picador.
- (1988) with Susan Hastings, Jeslyn Medoff, Melinda Sansone (eds). Kissing the Rod: An Anthology of Seventeenth-Century Women's Verse. London: Farrar, Straus and Giroux.
- (1989). Daddy, We Hardly Knew You. New York: Fawcett Columbine.
- (1989) (ed.). The Uncollected Verse of Aphra Behn. London: Stump Cross Books.
- (1990) with Ruth Little (eds). The Collected Works of Katherine Philips: The Matchless Orinda, Volume III, The Translations. London: Stump Cross Books.
- (1991). "The Offstage Mob: Shakespeare's Proletariat", in Tetsuo Kishi, Roger Pringle, and Stanley Wells (eds). Shakespeare and Cultural Traditions. Newark: University of Delaware Press, pp. 54–75.
- (1991). The Change: Women, Ageing and the Menopause. London: Hamish Hamilton.
- (1994). "Macbeth: Sin and Action of Grace", in J. Wain (ed.). Shakespeare: Macbeth. London: Macmillan, pp. 263–270.
- (1995). Slip-Shod Sibyls: Recognition, Rejection and the Woman Poet. Viking.
- (1997) with Susan Hastings (eds). The Surviving Works of Anne Wharton. London: Stump Cross Books.
- (1999). The Whole Woman. London: Doubleday.
- (2000). Lysistrata - The Sex Strike. London: Aurora Metro Books (with Phil Willmott).
- (2000). John Wilmot, Earl of Rochester. London: Northcote House Publishers.
- (2001) (ed.). 101 Poems by 101 Women. London: Faber & Faber.
- (2003). The Boy. London: Thames & Hudson.
- (2003) (ed.). Poems for Gardeners. London: Virago.
- (2004). Whitefella Jump Up: The Shortest Way to Nationhood. London: Profile Books (first published 2003 in Quarterly Essay).
- (2007). Shakespeare's Wife. London: Bloomsbury.
- (2007). Stella Vine. Oxford: Modern Art Oxford.
- (2008). "Shakespeare and the Marriage Contract", in Paul Raffield, Gary Watt (eds). Shakespeare and the Law. London: Bloomsbury, pp. 51–64.
- (2008). On Rage. Melbourne: Melbourne University Press.
- (2011) with Phil Willmott. Lysistrata: The Sex Strike: After Aristophanes. Samuel French Limited.
- (2013). White Beech: The Rainforest Years. London: Bloomsbury.
- (2018). On Rape. Melbourne: Melbourne University Press.
