= Northgate High School, Ipswich =

Northgate High School

Location
- Sidegate Lane West; Ipswich, Suffolk, IP4 3DL; England
- Coordinates: 52°04′19″N 1°10′51″E

Information
- Type: Community school
- Local authority: Suffolk
- Department for Education URN: 124840 Tables
- Ofsted: Reports
- Headteacher: R. Mackie
- Staff: 5
- Gender: Co-educational
- Age: 11 to 18
- Enrollment: 1736
- Colour
- Website: www.northgate.suffolk.sch.uk

Northgate High School (previously comprising Northgate Grammar School for Boys and Northgate Grammar School for Girls) is a co-educational secondary school situated in north Ipswich, Suffolk, England. It is a co-educational comprehensive school, for ages 11–16, and 16–18 in the Sixth Form Department. It has approximately 1736 children on roll.

Currently, the Headteacher is Rowena Mackie.

The school makes use of the Council-run Northgate Sports Centre, which has an Olympic standard running track.

== History ==
It was previously two schools: Northgate Grammar School for Boys and Northgate Grammar School for Girls. Earlier, it was Ipswich Municipal Secondary School.

=== Language College ===
Awarded Language College status in 1999, this was the first Language College designated in Suffolk. This development led to outreach work taking place in both the school's main feeder schools and across other schools in the county.

== Academic performance ==
In its most recent Ofsted inspection in November 2019, the school was graded as "Good" overall, with a number of individual outstanding grades. GCSE results are consistently above the national and regional averages, and at A-Level it gets results similar to a grammar school: the fifth best in Suffolk in 2008. In 2013, the school was placed in the top 100 state schools in England.

== Notable alumni ==
- Stuart Boardley, footballer
- Bailey Clements, footballer
- Gemma Correll, cartoonist
- David Gauke, former Conservative MP for South West Hertfordshire
- Luke Hyam, football manager and former player
- Liam Trotter, League One footballer
- Richard G. Whitman, academic

=== Northgate Grammar School ===
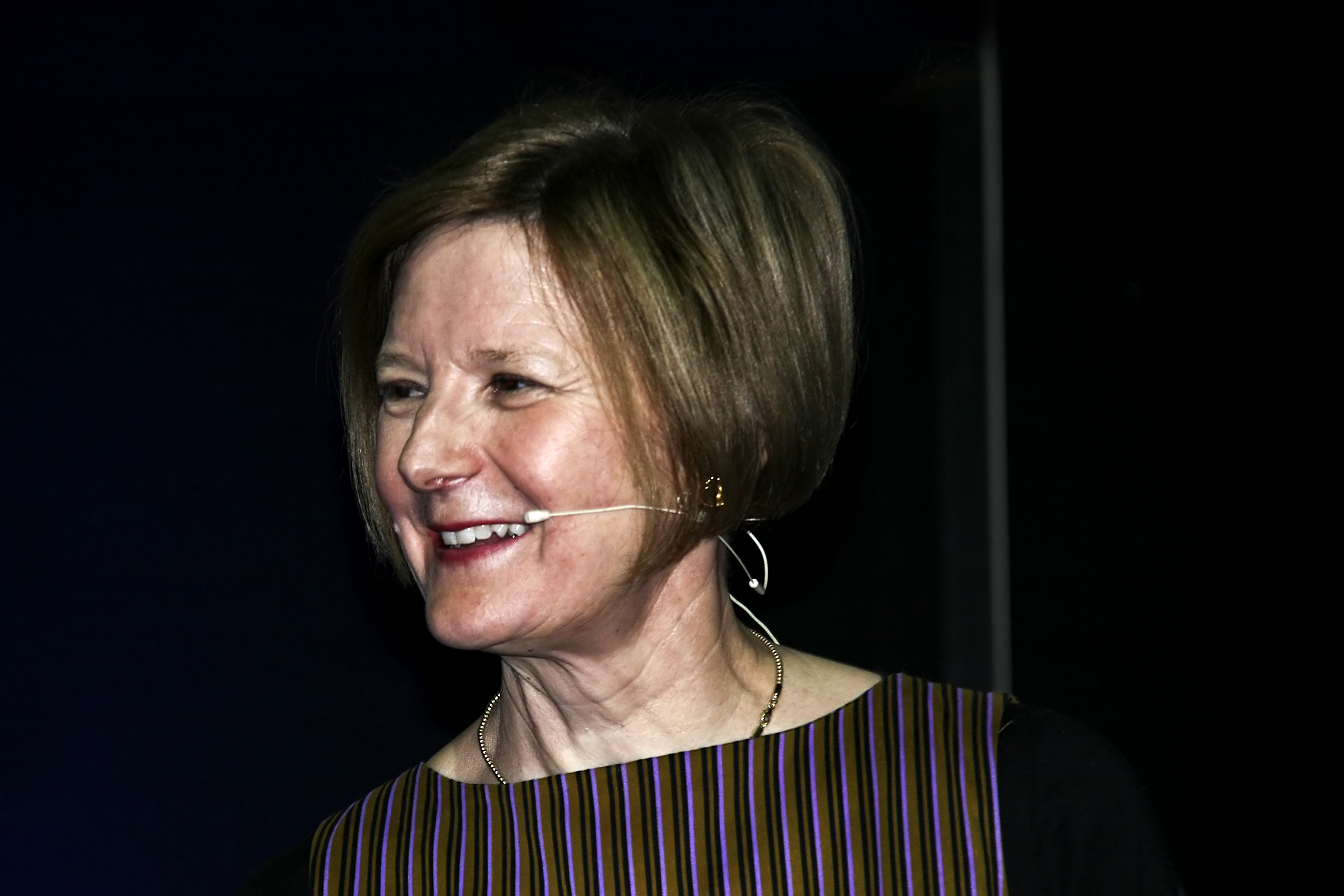
Helen Boaden in 2016

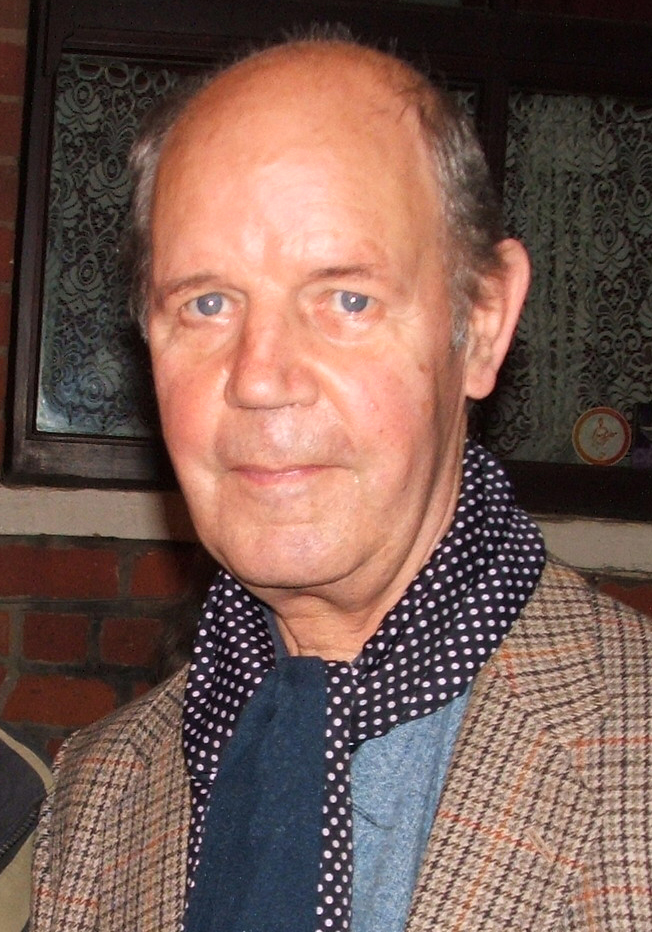
Brian Cant in 2009

- Rear-Adm Paul Bass, Flag Officer Portsmouth and Port Admiral Portsmouth from 1979 to 1981
- Very Rev Mark Bonney, Dean of Ely since 2012
- Malcolm Brabant, BBC Foreign Correspondent
- Helen Boaden, former Director of BBC News
- David Brighty, Ambassador to Cuba from 1989 to 1991, Czechia and Slovakia from 1991 to 1994, and to Spain (and Andorra) from 1994 to 1998
- Adrian Brown, International orchestra conductor
- Bernard Buckham, Daily Mirror journalist, and Editor from 1918 to 1920 of the Sunday Herald
- Terry Burrows, author/musician
- Brian Cant, long-established former BBC children's television presenter
- John Constable, Headteacher since 2010 of Langley Grammar School, Deputy Head from 2003 to 2009 of Wycombe High School and from 1998 to 2003 of Sir William Borlase's Grammar School
- James Easter, international speedway team manager from 1984 to 2000 of ENGLAND:Australia:USA
- David Edwards, Theatre Directorship
- Sir Cyril English, Director-General from 1968 to 1976 of the City and Guilds of London Institute
- Dr Edward Glazier, Director from 1967 to 1972 of the Royal Radar Establishment
- Prof Malcolm Guthrie, Professor of Bantu Languages from 1951 to 1970 at the University of London
- Garry Hart, Baron Hart of Chilton, Chancellor from 2008 to 2014 of the University of Greenwich
- Birkin Haward, architect (designer of West Ham station – with his wife, Joanna van Heyningen)
- Sir Edmund Hirst, Forbes Professor from 1947 to 1968 of Organic Chemistry at the University of Edinburgh, President of the Royal Society of Edinburgh from 1959 to 1964 and President from 1956 to 1958 of the Royal Society of Chemistry; he was the first person to synthesise Vitamin C in 1933.
- Nik Kershaw, singer and songwriter
- Jane Lapotaire, actress
- Prof Alan Little, Professor of Social Administration from 1978 to 1986 at Goldsmiths' College
- Geoffrey Lucas, General Secretary from 2000 to 2011 of The Headmasters' and Headmistresses' Conference, Director of the PGCE course from 1980 to 1989 at Trinity and All Souls College, Leeds
- Vice Adm Alan Massey, Chief Executive from 2010 to 2018 of the Maritime and Coastguard Agency, Second Sea Lord from 2008 to 2010, and Commander from 2001 to 2002 of HMS Illustrious, and from 2002 to 2003 of HMS Ark Royal
- Peter Mornard, Wimbledon referee
- Sir Trevor Nunn, film and theatre director and married to the actress Imogen Stubbs
- Dame Winifred Prentice, President from 1972 to 1976 of the Royal College of Nursing
- Nigel Roome, Professor from 1993 to 1996 at the Schulich School of Business, from 1996 to 1999 at University of Tilburg, from 1999 to 2006 at Erasmus University Rotterdam, from 2006 to 2011 at Free University Brussels and from 2010 at the Vlerick Business School and chair since 2006 of the European Academy of Business and Society
- Frank Salmon, architectural historian
- Peter Sharman, Chief General Manager from 1975 to 1984 for the Norwich Union Insurance Group
- Sir Frank Willis, General Secretary from 1939 to 1955 of the National Council of YMCAs, who married the daughter of the biochemist Sir Frederick Walker Mott
- Donald Woods, Iveagh Professor of Chemical Microbiology from 1955 to 1964 at the University of Oxford, won the 1953 Marjory Stephenson Prize
