= Suck (publication) =

Pornographic magazine

- Founded: 1969
- OCLC: 701854919

Suck: The First European Sex Paper was a British underground softcore pornographic magazine, which celebrated free love and queer sexuality. Founded in London in 1969, its collaborators included Jim Haynes, William Levy, Heathcote Williams, Germaine Greer, and Jean Shrimpton. The United Kingdom banned the publication prior to its first issue.

== See also ==
- Softcore pornography
