= Garry Hart, Baron Hart of Chilton =

The Right Honourable The Lord Hart of Chilton
- Hart in 2016

Member of the House of Lords
- Lord Temporal
- Life peerage 4 June 2004 – 3 August 2017

Personal details
- Born: 29 June 1940
- Died: 3 August 2017 (aged 77)
- Party: Labour

Garry Richard Rushby Hart, Baron Hart of Chilton (29 June 1940 – 3 August 2017), was a British Labour politician. From 1998 to 2007, he was Expert and then Special Adviser to the Lord Chancellor, first Lord Irvine of Lairg and then Lord Falconer of Thoroton.

== Education ==
Hart was educated at Northgate Grammar School for Boys, Ipswich and University College London

== Professional career ==
Before entering public service Hart was a highly successful planning solicitor with Herbert Smith. His appointment in 1998 was the subject of some controversy, but he was regarded as having a very beneficial influence on Lord Irvine, and serving also as a source of sound advice to Lord Falconer when the latter became Lord Chancellor in 2003. Hart helped guide the Lord Chancellor's Department as it became the Department for Constitutional Affairs, and again as it became the Ministry of Justice.

He was created a life peer on 4 June 2004 taking the title Baron Hart of Chilton, of Chilton in the County of Suffolk.

When Lord Falconer resigned in 2007, Lord Hart left his appointment. He had not spoken in the House of Lords following his peerage as this was considered inconsistent with his Government role. However, in 2007 he seconded the motion on the Queen's Speech in a well received contribution.

== Personal life ==
Lord Hart married first, in 1966, Paula Shepherd. They had two sons and a daughter. The marriage was dissolved in 1986. He married, secondly, in 1986, Valerie Davies, a lawyer. They had twin daughters.

Lord Hart lived in Chilton Hall in Suffolk with his second wife. Lord Hart was also godfather to Tony Blair's daughter Kathryn.

== Arms ==
Coat of arms of Garry Hart, Baron Hart of Chilton
| Adopted 2007 Coronet Coronet of a Baron Crest A Dragon sejant Gules armed langued and supporting with the dexter foreclaws a Sword point downwards Or Escutcheon Or three Cross Crosslets fitchy in fess Sable the lower limb of each surmounted by a Rose Gules seeded Or Supporters On either side a Suffolk Punch Gules the tail and mane plaited and tied with Ribbons Or Motto RISUS SAPIENTIAM EFFECIT Badge A Suffolk Punch's Head caboshed Gules holding in the mouth a Rose to the sinister Gules barbed seeded leaved and slipped Or Symbolism The Crest contains a Welsh allusion with the sword of justice reflecting the law. The cross crosslets are derived from the Arms of a family of Crane; and the rose for England is also an allusion to Cardinal Wolsey. Like many grantees, the ownership and breeding of animals provides for Crest and Supporter material. |

== Links ==
Profile, hansard.millbanksystems.com; accessed 4 August 2017.
