= White Beech: The Rainforest Years =

2013 book by Germaine Greer

- Cover of the first edition
- Author: Germaine Greer
- Language: English
- Publisher: Bloomsbury
- Publication date: 2013
- Publication place: United Kingdom
- Media type: Print (hardback and paperback)

White Beech: The Rainforest Years is a book describing efforts of regeneration of rainforest written by Germaine Greer. It was first published in 2013 by Bloomsbury and has been reprinted several times.

== Experiment ==
Germaine Greer was a successful writer by 2001 when she decided to invest all her earnings to purchase 60 hectares of overused land for a price of 268,000 pounds in the midst of a rainforest in Queensland, Australia. It was a part of Gondwana forest that was logged during 19th century and converted to a banana farm during the 20th century. She left the place to itself so that the rainforest would regenerate, and by 2013 her experiment was successful, where a part of the overused land regenerated as rainforest.

== Reception ==
The book is described by The Independent as "a quasi-religious epic out of a part of her remarkable life when she decided to restore a small, wrecked rainforest in Australia, her homeland. The tone is apocalyptic, themes existential and critical". The author received standing ovation on several occasions during her book introductory tour in Australia. The writer herself declared in the prologue of the book that the story of this book is an extraordinary stroke of luck. The New York Times dubs it "an untidy and mostly lackluster book, sad to say, one that buries her rhetorical gifts under several inches of mulch" but at the same time lauds it as one of the best love stories in book format. The Australian describes it as an "encyclopedic book – taking in botany, history and humility – it is ultimately a reflection on the only significant question: how we live on earth".
