= Nancy Mairs =

American writer (1943–2016)

- Born: Nancy Pedrick Smith; July 23, 1943; Long Beach, California, U.S.
- Died: December 3, 2016 (aged 73); Tucson, Arizona, U.S.
- Occupation: writer
- Known for: Argument against discrimination based on disability
- Spouse: George Mairs

Nancy Mairs (née Smith; July 23, 1943 – December 3, 2016) was an author who wrote about diverse topics, including spirituality, women's issues and her experiences living with multiple sclerosis.

== Life ==
Mairs was born on July 23, 1943, in Long Beach, California.

She was diagnosed with multiple sclerosis (MS) when she was 28, and began using a wheelchair soon after. She wrote several essays on her experiences as a self-described "cripple", including "On Being a Cripple," "Sex and the Gimpy Girl," and the memoir Waist High in the World.

In her 30s, she converted to Roman Catholicism, a faith that she frequently wrote about in her essays.

She was married to George Mairs.

Nancy Mairs died in Tucson, Arizona on December 3, 2016.

== Career ==
She earned an AB from Wheaton College in 1964.

Prior to attending graduate school, Mairs worked at the Smithsonian Astrophysical Observatory in Cambridge and the International Tax Program at Harvard Law School.

She went on to earn an MFA in writing in 1975 and a Ph.D. in 1983; both graduate degrees were from the University of Arizona.

Her PhD dissertation became the book that was eventually published as the essay collection Plaintext (1986).

Mairs published poetry and essays regularly, and was particularly well known for writing about her experiences as a woman with a physical disability.

She also wrote about her experiences with managing depression.

In 2011, Palgrave published On the Literary Nonfiction of Nancy Mairs: A Critical Anthology, an edited collection of her essays with commentaries on and essays about her work.

== Works ==
In All the Rooms of the Yellow House (1984)

On Being a Cripple (1986)
Plaintext:Deciphering a Woman’s Life (1986)
Remembering the Bonehouse (1989)
Carnal Acts (1990)
Ordinary Time (1993)
Voice Lessons (1994)
Waist-High in the World: A Life Among the Nondisabled (1996)
Voice Lessons: On Becoming a (Woman) Writer (1997)
A Troubled Guest: Life and Death Stories (2001)
Essays Out Loud: On Having Adventures & A Necessary End (CD) (2004)
A Dynamic God: Living an Unconventional Catholic Faith (2007)
