= Alan Little (academic) =

British social scientist

Alan Neville Little, JP (12 July 1934 – 18 October 1986) was a British social scientist.

== Biography ==
Alan Neville Little was born on 12 July 1934, the son of Charles Henry Little and Lilian Little. In 1955, he married Dr Valerie Hopkinson; they had three children. Little studied at the London School of Economics and Political Science (LSE), receiving a Bachelor of Science degree (BSc) in sociology and doctorate (PhD) in economics. He lectured at the LSE from 1959 to 1966 and then spent two years as a consultant at the Organisation for Economic Co-operation and Development (OECD). In 1968, he was appointed director of research and statistics at the Inner London Education Authority (ILEA). He then worked for the Community Relations Commission from 1973 to 1978, when he was appointed Lewisham Professor of Social Administration at Goldsmiths' College, University of London, in succession to Robert Pinker. He remained in the post until his death on 18 October 1986. Outside of academia, he had been a Justice of the Peace for Bromley since 1966 and was involved in the organisation of the Social Science Research Council.

Little's published works included Development of Secondary Education: Trends and Implications (1969), Strategies of Compensation (1971), Homelessness and Unemployment (1974), Urban Deprivation, Racial Inequality and Social Policy (1977), Multi-Ethnic Education: The Way Forward (1981), Loading the Law (1982), Studies in the Multi-Ethnic Curriculum (1983) and Race and Social Work (1986).
