= Gilbert Adair =

Scottish novelist and journalist

- Born: 29 December 1944; Edinburgh or Kilmarnock, Scotland
- Died: 8 December 2011 (aged 66); London, England
- Occupations: Novelist, film critic
- Writing career
- Language: English
- Genres: Fiction, non-fiction, film criticism

Gilbert Adair (29 December 1944 – 8 December 2011) was a Scottish novelist, poet, film critic, and journalist. He was critically most famous for the "fiendish" translation of Georges Perec's postmodern novel A Void, in which the letter e is not used, but was more widely known for the films adapted from his novels, including Love and Death on Long Island (1997) and The Dreamers (2003).

== Life and career ==
Adair was born in Edinburgh. (Note: Most sources give Adair's place of birth as "Edinburgh"; however, one article originally published on the British Film Institute website gives his birthplace as Kilmarnock. Also, the birth of only one Gilbert Adair is recorded for 1944–45 on the Scottish Government website https://www.scotlandspeople.gov.uk/, and the place of registration is Kilmarnock.) He attended Kilmarnock Academy, where he contributed short stories to the school magazine, and graduated with an MA in French from the University of Glasgow in 1967. From 1968 to 1980 he lived in Paris. His early works of fiction included Alice Through the Needle's Eye (following Alice's Adventures in Wonderland and Through the Looking-Glass) and Peter Pan and the Only Children (following Peter and Wendy). He won the Authors' Club Best First Novel Award in 1988 for his novel The Holy Innocents. From 1992 to 1996 he wrote the "Scrutiny" column for The Sunday Times. During 1998 and 1999 he was the chief film critic of The Independent on Sunday, where in 1999 he also wrote a year-long column called "The Guillotine".

In 1995 he won the Scott Moncrieff Prize for his book A Void, which is a translation of the French book La Disparition by Georges Perec. The original book contains no instances of the letter e; Adair translated it with the same limitation. His works are compared to those of Julian Barnes, A. S. Byatt and Patrick Gale. His book Flickers: A History of the Cinema in 100 Images was admired by David Foster Wallace.

The film Love and Death on Long Island (1997), directed by Richard Kwietniowski, was based on his 1990 novel of the same name. The film The Dreamers (2003) directed by Bernardo Bertolucci, with a script by Adair, was based on his book The Holy Innocents, which Adair revised and re-released under the same title as the film. Adair collaborated on the screenplays of several Raúl Ruiz films: The Territory (1981), Klimt (2006) and A Closed Book (2010).

Adair was gay, though he rarely talked about the matter, not wishing to be labelled. "Obviously there are gay themes in a lot of my novels," he said in an interview soon before he died, "but I really wouldn't be happy to be thought of as a 'Gay Writer' ... Being gay hasn't defined my life." At the end of his life, he lived in London. Adair died from a brain haemorrhage on 8 December 2011, at age 66, thirteen months after suffering a stroke which blinded him. He was writing a stage version of Love and Death on Long Island, which was being developed by producers New Gods and Heroes, at the time of his death.

== Bibliography ==
=== Fiction ===
- Alice Through the Needle's Eye (1984)
- Peter Pan and the Only Children (1987)
- The Holy Innocents (1988) – winner of the Author's Club First Novel Award, a tale of sexual obsession set against the backdrop of the Paris street riots of 1968.
- Love and Death on Long Island (1990)
- The Death of the Author (1992) – a black satire of contemporary theoretical cultishness and a metaphysical murder mystery
- The Key of the Tower (1997)
- A Closed Book (1999) – a literary thriller about a prize-winning novelist left blind after a serious car accident.
- Buenas Noches, Buenos Aires (2003) – the story of Gideon, a young Englishman in 1980s Paris, on the verge of sexual discovery
- The Dreamers (2003) – the revised version of his 1988 novel, The Holy Innocents.

==== Evadne Mount trilogy ====
1. The Act of Roger Murgatroyd (2006) – a murder mystery set in the 1930s on Dartmoor
2. A Mysterious Affair of Style (2007)
3. And Then There Was No One (2009)

=== Non-fiction ===
- Frog Specialist Marketing Poem (Writers Forum) 1984
- A Night at the Pictures (with Nick Roddick) (1985)
- Myths & Memories (1986)
- Vietnam on Film (1981)
- The Postmodernist Always Rings Twice (1992)
- Wonder Tales: Six French Stories of Enchantment (editor with Marina Warner) (1995)
- Flickers: An Illustrated Celebration of 100 Years of Cinema (1995)
- Surfing the Zeitgeist (1997; an anthology of his Sunday Times "Scrutiny" columns)
- Movies (editor) (1999)
- The Real Tadzio (2001) – a biography of the boy (Baron Władysław Moes) who inspired Thomas Mann's Death in Venice.

=== Screenplay ===
- The Dreamers (2003) – the film adaptation of his 1988 novel, The Holy Innocents.

=== Translations ===
- Letters by François Truffaut (1990) (also editor)
- A Void by Georges Perec (1994) — winner of the Scott Moncrieff Translation Prize
- Zazie in the Metro by Raymond Queneau (2000) (introduction)
