= A Closed Book =

A Closed Book may refer to:

- A Closed Book (novel)
- A Closed Book (film)
