= The Beautiful Boy =

2003 book by Germaine Greer

- Cover of The Beautiful Boy, showing Björn Andrésen in 1970 by David Bailey (international edition)
- Author: Germaine Greer
- Language: English
- Subjects: Art history
- Publisher: Thames & Hudson
- Publication date: 2003
- Media type: Print
- Pages: 256
- ISBN: 978-0-5002-8488-9

The Beautiful Boy is a book by radical feminist academic Germaine Greer, published in 2003 as The Boy in the Commonwealth by Thames & Hudson and in the rest of the world by Rizzoli. Its avowed intention was "to advance women's reclamation of their capacity for and right to visual pleasure". The book is a study of the youthful male face and form, from antiquity to the present day, from paintings and drawings to statuary and photographs.

The book was the subject of controversy due to its cover photo and topic matter. The subject of the book's cover picture, Björn Andrésen, stated that his permission was not attained for the photo's use. Some writers characterised the book's nature as paedophilic.

Critical reception was largely positive towards the book's illustrative value as a photo book, but mixed towards its textual and theoretical value.

== Content ==
The book contains some 200 pictures of boys through the ages, and is a history of boys in Western art and classical mythology. This includes an analysis of Classical, Neoclassical, and Renaissance art. Pictures and discussions range from Cupid to Elvis, Boy George, Kurt Cobain, and Jim Morrison.

Writing in the book's opening pages, Greer says that "most people have accepted without question that women are treated as sex objects, viewed principally as body, with a primary duty to attract male attention. Though this is clearly true, it is also true that women are at the same time programmed for failure in their duty of attraction, because boys do it better". She continues by saying that the ideally attractive boy must be "old enough to be capable of sexual response but not yet old enough to shave. This window of opportunity is not only narrow, it is mostly illegal. The male human is beautiful when his cheeks are still smooth, his body hairless, his head full-maned, his eyes clear, his manner shy and his belly flat".

She says that male youth was previously prized artistically, but in more recent centuries was displaced by a preference for adult masculinity. Accordingly, she argues that male youthfulness was desexualised in art. She says that, "At the end of the 20th century, guilty panic about pedophilia completed the criminalisation of awareness of the desires and the charms of boys... Where once boys were considered 'made for love and loved of all' they are now considered attractive only to a perverted taste." According to Greer, "among the attributes that are on the verge of extinction is youthful narcissism". She also wrote that "boy sex is irresponsible, spontaneous and principally self-pleasuring".

She argues that young male beauty conveys "male vulnerability" and can be "sexualised with impunity", via the "female gaze". She also says that boys are "debarred from phallic power", and that they are compelled by patriarchy to "annihilate the boy in him and confine himself to the narrower scope available to him in patriarchal society". She proposes that "[campaigners] against 21st-century sex tourism see the traffic as one-way. Their activities are inspired by horror and compassion for children who are forced by economic necessity to have sex that they are not ready for with older people they could not possibly desire. (This assumption itself should cast some doubt on the campaigners' own motives.) When she was studying the 'bad' sexualised mother, the great Melanie Klein asked herself in a note: 'Who is seducing whom?'"

According to Greer, pederastic lust was not what art that depicted young males historically expressed, and that these images were attractive due to being based in life rather than lust. In her conclusion she says that "the boy Eros would bring the sexes to a reconciliation, if we would only acknowledge him".

== Reception ==
=== Book reviews ===
Reviewing The Beautiful Boy in The Guardian, feminist writer Natasha Walter said that "because Greer relies on such close criticism of the art, this is a book that is best savoured slowly... Greer has chosen to examine her subject thematically rather than chronologically, which means that you are constantly doubling back on yourself, bumping into Cupid again just after you have put away Boy George, which makes it tough trying to hold on to any sense of development across the centuries". According to art critic Sue Hubbard of The Independent, it was "thoroughly researched and beautifully illustrated... [but it] does not seem really significant in terms of art history and amounts to a footnote within critical theory. Others of a more voyeuristic bent might feel cheated that the book is rather dryer and less erotic than the title promises".

In The Irish Times, Robert O'Byrne said that the book was "...a dreary and muddled text. Indeed, The Boy could be summarised as mad, bad and not worth knowing. Constantly meandering in its approach, the book fails to deliver clearly what Greer has declared at the outset as her intent: 'to reclaim for women the right to appreciate the short-lived beauty of boys'".

Miranda Carter, reviewing the book for The Daily Telegraph, described it as a "handsomely produced, leisurely coffee-table trawl through the art canon, tracing images of boys in art from childhood through adolescence to young manhood, starting with Grecian kouroi and Greek myths and ending up with pop stars". In a review for The Sunday Times, James Hall says that, "at first flick, The Boy resembles a ravishing picture-book for the smart coffee table. But the text and some of the images are pretty incendiary. Alongside famous Old Master depictions of luscious boys (mythological, biblical and secular), we find recent 'art' photographs that have been accused of pandering to paedophiles".

The Age called the book "an insightful survey of male beauty through the ages and a powerful and radical polemic ... It is occasionally undermined by erroneous statements ... and self-indulgent whimsy that you will find—depending on whether you love or hate the author—either endearingly idiosyncratic or utterly outrageous". In Peter Conrad's review of The Beautiful Boy for The Observer, he said that "Greer's ogling defiantly disproves the orthodox feminist notion that 'the act of viewing is masculine'".

Robert Douglas-Fairhurst said of the book in The Art Newspaper, "[Although] she is better at picking fights than constructing arguments, none of Dr Greer's occasional lapses stifles the frisky playfulness of her book as whole... Dr Greer has managed to produce a book that is itself distinctly boyish... Dr Greer's title seems to offer more than a description of her main subject. It also characterises the polymorphous appeal of her way of looking at it." A writer for Publishers Weekly said of the book, "Short on argument but long on lush reproductions of languid young men, the collection is better viewed than read."

In The New Zealand Herald, Alison Jones wrote that "Greer's affectionate enjoyment of boys will resonate with that of countless mothers (and fathers) who adore their sons' litheness and mourn its passing. It may be prosaic to confess this, but as a mother of teenage sons, I found this book a genuine balm". For Prospect, Sebastian Smee wrote that "many people's first instinct may be that she is exploiting the dubious sanctuary of art to validate dangerous desires. But in the current climate, in which we have all but given up on the distinction between eroticism and pornography, Greer is trying to draw a distinction between delight and desire. There is a subtlety in the writing and an openness to complication one doesn't always find in her work. The result is a book that strikes me as courageous".

Writing in The New York Times, Janet Maslin said that the book provided "scholarly text that can't compete with the pictures". In Literary Review, the literary critic Miranda Seymour called the book "a tasty scrapbook of male beauty". Reviewing the book for Australian Book Review, Ian Britain commented that "there's little here, in fact, that you could call argument, in the sense of a coherent succession of reasoned propositions: nothing so solid or stable to argue against; nothing so stolid or boring. When not beguiled by the next image of upwardly nubile flesh, sumptuously reproduced from the work of the world's great visual artists, you're more at risk of being left stupefied by the next authorial assertion".

In response to Greer's statement in the book about sex tourism, Jenny Diski for the London Review of Books said, "Would it be impossibly puritanical to point out that child prostitution might be qualitatively different from the painful but civilised love of pubescent boys for older women?... And does the same apply to older men and girls, or older men and boys, or older women and girls? Sometimes Greer's admirable intellect is subsumed by the need to make a noise in the world. Which is a pity, because she is addressing a real issue here about our inability to be honest with ourselves; a sorry failure to understand the difference between protecting our own socially constructed sensibilities, and protecting children from harm." However, she also stated that "In the meantime, the good news is that Greer’s theorising permits the production of a very handsome book full of beautifully reproduced paintings and sculptures from galleries around the world."

Jonathan Gornall commented on the book in The Times, calling it "a somewhat iffy collection of pictures of pre-pubescent lovelies from life and art, an illustrated paean of praise for the beauty of the young male presented as a feminist rallying cry for women's right to ogle under-age male totty".

In The New York Review of Books, Christopher Alessandrini called it "part glossy coffee-table smut, part art-historical treatise on desire", as well as an "out-of-print curiosity". He also said that "it remains an unusual bit of propaganda calling for the return of young men to the realm of public attraction... the claim that beautiful boys are essential fixtures of public life is hardly radical. Western art history corroborates it: How many iterations of St. Sebastian, bound and stuck with arrows, decorate the public squares and churches of Europe? How many likenesses of Ganymede, commissioned by lords and counts?".

=== Controversy ===
The cover picture caused controversy when the subject of the photograph, Björn Andrésen, a Swedish actor and musician who played Tadzio in Death in Venice (billed by the director Luchino Visconti as "the most beautiful boy in the world"), stated in the press that he objected to the picture having been used without his permission. He was fifteen years old when the photograph was taken. Greer's publisher, Thames & Hudson, said they did not require his permission to use the picture on the book's cover. The company's publishing director, Jamie Camplin, stated that they had acquired permission from David Bailey instead. Camplin was also quoted as saying, "It's not exploitation, it's the opposite. She's celebrating it, enjoying it. Here's this wonderful-looking young man: enjoy it!". Andrésen was reportedly also disturbed by the content of Greer's book. He stated, "Adult love for adolescents is something that I am against in principle... Emotionally perhaps, and intellectually, I am disturbed by it—because I have some insight into what this kind of love is about."

Greer has described her book as "full of pictures of 'ravishing' pre-adult boys with hairless chests, wide-apart legs and slim waists". She goes on to say that "I know that the only people who are supposed to like looking at pictures of boys are a sub-group of gay men", she wrote in London's Daily Telegraph. "Well, I'd like to reclaim for women the right to appreciate the short-lived beauty of boys, real boys, not simpering 30-year-olds with shaved chests." She was criticised for these comments, with some writers labeling her a paedophile. Greer responded vigorously on Andrew Denton's television talk show Enough Rope. Denton quoted her as having said to the Sydney Morning Herald that "a woman of taste is a pederast—boys rather than men". She had anticipated that she would be called a paedophile after the book's publication, and was quoted as saying, "This book is going to get me into a lot of trouble. I'll be called a paedophile after this."

== Editions ==
- The Boy. London: Thames & Hudson. 2003. ISBN 9780500238097, republished in 2007 ISBN 978-0-5002-8488-9.
- The Beautiful Boy. New York: Rizzoli. 2003. ISBN 978-0-8478-2586-8.
- Der Knabe (in German). Translated by Sylvia Strasser. Hildesheim: Gerstenberg Verlag. 2003. ISBN 978-3-8067-2920-7.
- Il ragazzo (in Italian). Genoa: L'ippocampo. 2004. ISBN 978-8-8885-8542-0.

== See also ==
- The Most Beautiful Boy in the World – 2021 documentary film about Björn Andrésen
