= Love and Death on Long Island (novel) =

1990 novel by Gilbert Adair

- Author: Gilbert Adair
- Publisher: Random House
- Publication date: 1990
- ISBN: 978-0-434-00622-9

Love and Death on Long Island is a novella written by Gilbert Adair and first published in 1990.

== Adaptations ==
- It was adapted as a 1997 film, Love and Death on Long Island, directed by Richard Kwietniowski and starring Jason Priestley, John Hurt and Fiona Loewi.
- It was adapted as a stage play with music by Ben Parry, book and libretto by Gilbert Adair himself, directed by Edward Williams with Anna Carteret, Gordon Fraser and Richard O'Callaghan in London's West End in 2008.
