= Björn Andrésen =

Swedish actor and musician (1955–2025)

- Bjorn Andrésen in 1971
- Born: Björn Johan Andrésen; 26 January 1955; Stockholm, Sweden
- Died: 25 October 2025 (aged 70); Stockholm, Sweden
- Education: Adolf Fredrik's Music School
- Occupations: Actor; musician
- Years active: 1970–2025
- Spouse: Susanna Roman (m. 1983; div. 1987)
- Children: 2

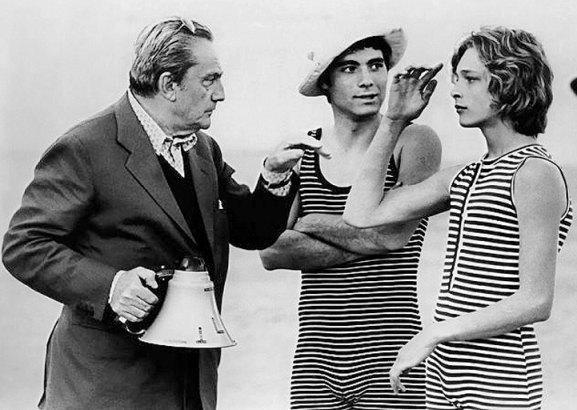
Luchino Visconti, Sergio Garfagnoli and Björn Andrésen during the filming of Death in Venice in 1970

Björn Johan Andrésen (26 January 1955 – 25 October 2025) was a Swedish actor and musician. He was best known for having played the 14-year-old Tadzio in Luchino Visconti's 1971 film adaptation of the 1912 Thomas Mann novella Death in Venice.

== Early life ==
Andrésen was born on 26 January 1955 in Stockholm, Sweden where he was raised. His father, an artist, died when Andrésen was two years old. His mother, Barbro Elisabeth Andrésen, took her own life when he was ten years old. (Note: As documented in The Most Beautiful Boy in the World (2021), Andrésen discusses family life with his sister. He also discussed boarding school life. The documentary also shows him viewing the police records of his mother's death. She went missing in October 1965 when Andrésen was ten years old and her body was discovered in woodland in May 1966.) He was then brought up by his maternal grandparents. Part of his schooling was at a boarding school in Denmark. Andrésen attended Adolf Fredrik's Music School in Stockholm.

== Career ==
Andrésen's initial exposure to the entertainment industry was heavily influenced by his maternal grandmother. Following his mother's death, she actively encouraged and pressured him to pursue acting and modelling jobs, motivated by a personal ambition to have a famous grandchild. Andrésen had only previously appeared in one film, En kärlekshistoria (1970), when he was cast in Death in Venice, which gained him international recognition. Andrésen's role was as Tadzio, the Polish boy with whom the film's older protagonist Gustav von Aschenbach (played by Dirk Bogarde) becomes obsessed. Film historian Lawrence J. Quirk commented in his study The Great Romantic Films (1974) that some shots of Andrésen "could be extracted from the frame and hung on the walls of the Louvre or the Vatican". Following the Cannes Film Festival a year after the premiere of Death in Venice, Andrésen was referred to in newspaper headlines as "the most beautiful boy in the world".

Andrésen later described his discomfort with his role in Death in Venice and its director Luchino Visconti, stating that "when I watch it now, I see how that son of a bitch sexualized me." At the time of the film's release, rumours circulated in the United States that Andrésen was homosexual (as the role demanded that he appear to exchange romantic glances with the protagonist, and on another occasion be kissed and caressed by another teenage boy), which Andrésen emphatically denied. After the film's premiere, Visconti pressured Andrésen to attend a gay club, where he was made uncomfortable by the staring of adult men; Andrésen later described the experience as "hell".

Eager to dispel the rumours regarding his sexuality and to shed his "pretty boy" image, Andrésen avoided homosexual roles and parts which he felt would play off his good looks, and was irritated when Germaine Greer used a photograph of him on the cover of her book The Beautiful Boy (2003) without his permission. Greer consulted photographer David Bailey (who owned the copyright for the image) before publishing the book. Andrésen maintained that it is common practice when a party uses an image of a person which has been copyrighted by a different individual to inform the individual and that he would not have given his consent for Greer to use his picture if she had informed him of her plans.

After the release of Death in Venice, Andrésen spent an extended period of time in Japan where he became an instant cultural idol. His image was widely used in the youth market, leading him to work as a model in fashion magazines (such as An-An) and his face appearing everywhere on billboards and in television commercials for products like Meiji chocolate. This intense commercial activity cemented his status as a key figure in the popular 'Bishōnen' (beautiful boy) aesthetic and also recorded several pop songs. Andrésen had a strong liking for Japan after that and visited the country again over the years. Andrésen's arrival in Tokyo has been described as being similar to The Beatles landing in the U.S. The young actor was met with mass hysteria and received an enormous amount of female attention.

Andrésen appeared in several other films. These include Smugglarkungen (1985), Kojan (1992), Pelicanman (2004), and Midsommar (2019). In addition to being an actor, Andrésen was a professional musician, and had performed and toured regularly with the Sven Erics dance band. In 2021, Andrésen was the focus of The Most Beautiful Boy in the World, a documentary detailing his experiences post-fame after the premiere of Death in Venice.

== Personal life and death ==
Andrésen resided in Stockholm. He had a daughter Robin (b. 1984) with his then-wife, poet Susanna Roman, with whom he was married from 1983 to 1987. Andrésen and Roman had a second child, a son named Elvin, in 1986, who died of sudden infant death syndrome at nine months of age. Andrésen fell into a long depression following the death of his son. In an interview in 2020, Andrésen stated that he believed he would meet his son again "in the afterlife". Andrésen had two granddaughters: Lo (born 2008) and Nike (born 2014). Andrésen died of cancer at a hospital in Stockholm, Sweden, on 25 October 2025, at the age of 70.

== Filmography ==
- 1970 – A Swedish Love Story (Swedish: En kärlekshistoria)
- 1971 – Death in Venice (Italian: Morte a Venezia)
- 1977 – Bluff Stop
- 1982 – The Simple-Minded Murderer (Swedish: Den enfaldige mördaren)
- 1982 – One-Week Bachelors (Swedish: Gräsänklingar)
- 1985 – The Smuggler King
- 1986 – Whiskers and Peas
- 1987 – Luminous Landing (TV series)
- 1989 – Dandelion Children (Swedish: Maskrosbarn)
- 1989 – That Was Then... (TV series)
- 1990 – À la recherche de Tadzio (nine-minute documentary directed by Étienne Faure with film and interview of Andrésen)
- 1990 – Lucifer - Late Summer Yellow and Black (Swedish: Lucifer – Sensommer gult og sort)
- 1991 – Agnes Cecilia – en sällsam historia [Agnes Cecilia – A Strange Story ]
- 1993 – Kojan
- 1994 – Rederiet [High Seas or The Shipping Company] (television series)
- 2004 – Pelicanman (Finnish: Pelikaanimies)
- 2004 – The Grave (2004 TV series) (television series)
- 2005 – Lasermannen (TV series) [The Laserman]
- 2006 – Book of the Worlds (Swedish: Världarnas bok) (television series)
- 2010 – Wallander – Arvet [The Heritage]
- 2016–2017 – Spring Tide (television series) (Swedish: Springfloden)
- 2016 – Shelley
- 2017 – Jordskott (television series)
- 2019 – Midsommar
- 2021 – Agatha Christie's Hjerson – Oscar

== Documentaries ==
- 2016: Hotellet [The Hotel]
- 2021: The Most Beautiful Boy in the World

== See also ==
- The Beautiful Boy – 2003 book by Germaine Greer
