= A Mysterious Affair of Style =

2007 novel by Gilbert Adair

- First edition
- Author: Gilbert Adair
- Language: English
- Genre: Mystery novel
- Publisher: Faber and Faber
- Publication date: 2007
- Publication place: United Kingdom
- Pages: 292
- ISBN: 978-0-571-23425-7
- OCLC: 153556058
- Dewey Decimal: 823/.914 22
- LC Class: PR6051.D287 M97 2007
- Preceded by: The Act of Roger Murgatroyd
- Followed by: And Then There Was No One

A Mysterious Affair of Style is a whodunit mystery novel by British writer Gilbert Adair, first published in 2007. A homage to the Golden Age of Detective Fiction in general and Agatha Christie in particular, the novel is a sequel to Adair's 2006 book, The Act of Roger Murgatroyd.

== Plot summary ==
Set in post-war London and at Elstree Studios, Hertfordshire, the "mysterious affair" of the title is the murder of ageing actress Cora Rutherford on the set of the film which she hopes will mark her comeback to the silver screen. As it happens, mystery writer Evadne Mount, an old friend of Cora's, and Chief-Inspector Trubshawe, retired, formerly of Scotland Yard, are watching the shooting of the scene in which the actress drinks from a champagne glass whose content, unbeknownst to everyone except the murderer, has been laced with a strong poison. Right from the start of the investigation, a neat group of suspects presents itself to the police. However, although each of them would have had means and opportunity to kill Cora Rutherford, none of them has the slightest motive to have done so. It takes amateur sleuth Evadne Mount several days to figure out the solution to the crime, and only by linking up the murder with an accident which happened some time previously, and eventually by using a decoy, is she able to solve the case.

== Cultural references ==
In a postmodernist fashion, Adair not only has his characters, especially Evadne Mount, discuss red herrings, twist endings, spoilers, and reader response in general, he also tells a story in which he both obeys and transgresses the boundaries and conventions of the Golden Age whodunit. On the one hand, there is no violence, let alone police brutality, anywhere in the novel; the suspects are interrogated one after another in an orderly manner; during her investigation into the crime Evadne Mount accidentally finds a piece of paper with a cryptic message written on it; and in the end, when all suspects have been assembled at the scene of the crime to be told which of them has done it, it is indeed the least likely person who turns out to be the killer.

On the other hand, Adair toys with, and transcends, some of the conventions of the genre. For example, Cora Rutherford is murdered rather late in the novel, which is clearly against the rules. In a paraphrase of Ronald Knox, who claimed in 1929 that the elements of the mystery have to be "clearly presented to the reader at an early stage in the proceedings", Evadne Mount says so herself :

In real life, the seed of virtually every serious crime, not only murder, is sown long before the performance of the act itself. Yet it's one of the cast-iron rules of the whodunit, a crucial clause in the contract between writer and reader, that a murder be perpetrated, or at the least attempted, within the first twenty or thirty pages of the book. To leave it to the halfway mark would be a serious test of the reader's patience.

Yet in A Mysterious Affair of Style the murder of Cora Rutherford occurs on page 123, almost halfway through the book. Also, neither of the three people investigating the murder is attributed the role of the Watson. Rather, Evadne Mount, Trubshawe and Calvert, a young Scotland Yard detective and former protégé of Trubshawe, form a perfect team and are at one point referred to as "the three friends".

Clearly Adair is taking liberties when he makes Evadne Mount president of the Detection Club (which at the time was headed by E. C. Bentley). While there are references to British followers of the "thick-ear school"—the hardboiled style of crime writing— such as Peter Cheyney and James Hadley Chase, Evadne Mount's major worry is Agatha Christie herself, "the rival in whose shadow it would seem she was eternally condemned to languish" despite the more than twenty successful whodunits she has published herself. Mount's long-running stage play, The Tourist Trap, anachronistically echoes Christie's The Mousetrap, which has been running in the West End since 1952.

Alastair Farjeon, the film director in the novel, appears to be a thinly disguised Alfred Hitchcock. Farjeon specializes in thrillers but, contrary to Hitchcock's practice, always writes his own stories and screenplays, which he then turns into successful films such as Remains to be Seen (about a photographer being stabbed while he is taking a picture of a group of archaeologists at an excavation site in Egypt) or An American in Plaster-of-Paris (alluding, again anachronistically, to both the 1951 movie, An American in Paris and the plot of Hitchcock's 1954 thriller, Rear Window). His surname is a reference to Joseph Jefferson Farjeon, another prolific golden age British mystery writer, some of whose stories were adapted for the cinema.

However, it turns out that Farjeon has stolen the script of If Ever They Find Me Dead—the film during whose shooting Cora Rutherford is murdered—from Philippe Françaix, one of his most ardent admirers and a fledgling film theorist in his own right who has copied his master's style and written an original screenplay in honour of his idol. The character of Philippe Françaix seems to be modelled on film critic and film theorist André Bazin or maybe François Truffaut who, in 1954, advocated auteur theory, claiming that a director's films reflect that director's personal creative vision, as if he or she were the primary "auteur," and that a film critic can only write a review of a film if they like it.

References are also made to Julien Duvivier, René Clair, Ernst Lubitsch, William Wyler, and Orson Welles.

Cora Rutherford's surname is probably derived from the actress Margaret Rutherford who played Agatha Christie's Miss Marple in a series of MGM films in the early 1960s.

Finally, Adair creates a 1940s milieu by making (occasionally politically incorrect) references to, among many other things, dirty weekends, street urchins, spivs, "syncopated Negro music", "frogs" (such as Philippe Françaix), Woodbines, and the 'phone.

== See also ==
- The Evadne Mount trilogy (The Act of Roger Murgatroyd, A Mysterious Affair of Style, and And Then There Was No One)
- Pastiche
