= And Then There Was No One =

2009 novel by Gilbert Adair

- First edition
- Author: Gilbert Adair
- Language: English
- Genre: Mystery novel, postmodern fiction
- Publisher: Faber and Faber
- Publication date: 2009
- Publication place: United Kingdom
- Pages: 258 pp.
- ISBN: 978-0-571-23881-1
- OCLC: 260207170
- Preceded by: A Mysterious Affair of Style

And Then There Was No One is a novel by Gilbert Adair first published in 2009. After The Act of Roger Murgatroyd and A Mysterious Affair of Style, it is the third book in the Evadne Mount trilogy. However, rather than being yet another more or less straightforward whodunit, albeit with postmodern overtones, And Then There Was No One thoroughly blurs the boundaries between reality and fiction; or rather, reality, fiction, and metafiction.

The book is presented in the form of a (fictional) memoir written by a British author called Gilbert Adair who has recently published two successful whodunits featuring mystery writer turned amateur sleuth Evadne Mount entitled The Act of Roger Murgatroyd and A Mysterious Affair of Style. In September 2011, he travels to Meiringen, Switzerland to participate in the town's Sherlock Holmes conference. While he is staying there, two unexpected things happen: firstly, Anglo-Bulgarian novelist and essayist Gustav Slavorigin, the star of the festival, is murdered; and secondly, to his great surprise, Adair discovers Evadne Mount, the inspiration for his protagonist and the sharer of royalties from the two novels, sitting among the audience.

As with the first two books in the trilogy, the title is again a variation on an Agatha Christie novel, And Then There Were None.

== Major themes ==
As opposed to the other novels in the trilogy, in And Then There Was No One there is a definitive shift away from the murder mystery and its solution toward "self-referentiality", toward the author and his or her problems. One aspect is plagiarism, which at one point is even discussed as a possible motive for Slavorigin's murder; another is the author's choice of subject. In the years before his violent death, Slavorigin had been in hiding as he had published several essays critical of the United States and had therefore become, like Rushdie in reverse, the target of a fatwā-like edict pronounced by some obscure Texan multi-millionaire. A third aspect is the author's wish to distance himself from his own creations if not to get rid of them once and for all, to "murder" them—the way Arthur Conan Doyle tried to rid himself of Sherlock Holmes at the Reichenbach Falls and Adair is struggling to dispose of Evadne Mount.

== Reviews ==
- Tom Adair
- Hugo Barnacle
- Philip French
- Robert Hanks
- Jake Kerridge
- Caroline Moore
- Laura Wilson
