= My Dinner with Jimi =

2003 film by Bill Fishman

My Dinner With Jimi
- Directed by: Bill Fishman
- Written by: Howard Kaylan
- Produced by: Harold Bronson
- Starring: Justin Henry; Jason Boggs; Royale Watkins
- Distributed by: Rhino Films; Fallout Entertainment
- Release date: February 16, 2003 (Santa Monica International Film Festival)
- Running time: 90 minutes
- Country: United States
- Language: English

My Dinner with Jimi is a 2003 comedy film directed by Bill Fishman and written by Howard Kaylan, dealing with events in 1966–67 which led up to the night in 1967 when the Turtles encountered the Beatles and Kaylan had dinner with Jimi Hendrix in London, England. The film also depicts other 1960s rock icons like Brian Jones, Frank Zappa, Donovan, Cass Elliott and Jim Morrison. The film was given an extremely limited theatrical release in Toronto in late September 2007.

== Plot ==
The story focuses on the Turtles in the days leading up to and following the success of their single "Happy Together". Howard Kaylan and Mark Volman receive their draft cards and Frank Zappa tells them to seek advice from Herb Cohen, Zappa's manager and Kaylan's cousin, to avoid being drafted in the Vietnam War. Cohen advises Kaylan to show up to the draft board intoxicated from drug use, not to bathe or sleep, and to behave so obnoxiously that the Army will not draft him, leading Kaylan and Volman to engage in a sleepless night of marijuana smoking before their draft review, which they fail due to being high while taking the tests, and Kaylan pretending to be homosexual in front of the physician and expressing psychotic views to the psychiatrist.

Because they avoid the draft, the Turtles fly to England where Graham Nash and Donovan play them an advance reel to reel recording of the unreleased Beatles album Sgt. Pepper's Lonely Hearts Club Band, which the Turtles declare to be the greatest album they ever heard. At a nearby pub, the Turtles have a disastrous meeting with the Beatles, in which Turtles guitarist Jim Tucker is verbally abused by John Lennon, leading the Turtles to leave the bar as Kaylan stays behind and Brian Jones, the founder of the Rolling Stones, introduces Kaylan to Jimi Hendrix, who Kaylan ends up having dinner and a conversation with, while the two drink much alcohol and smoke marijuana, with the evening ultimately ending with Kaylan vomiting on Hendrix' suit.

Kaylan ultimately purchases copies of Sgt. Pepper and the Jimi Hendrix Experience's debut, Are You Experienced? and Tucker quits the Turtles and the music industry, never getting over his treatment by John Lennon, although the postscript states that Tucker remains a fan of the Beatles' music.

== Cast ==
- Justin Henry as Howard Kaylan
- Jason Boggs as Mark Volman
- Royale Watkins as Jimi Hendrix
- Sean Maysonet as Jim "Tucko" Tucker
- George Stanchev as Al Nichol
- Kevin Cotteleer as Jim Pons
- Brett Gilbert as John Barbata
- George Wendt as Bill Uttley
- Curtis Armstrong as Herb Cohen
- John Corbett as Henry Diltz
- Wendie Jo Sperber as Louella
- Taylor Negron as Dr. Barich
- Brian Groh as John Lennon
- Quinton Flynn as Paul McCartney
- Nate Dushku as George Harrison
- Ben Bode as Ringo Starr
- Jay Michael Ferguson as Brian Jones
- Chris Soldevilla as Graham Nash
- Rob Benedict as Donovan
- Jillie Simon as Jane Asher
- Chris Elwood as Justin Hayward
- Todd Lowe as John Lodge
- Bret Roberts as Jim Morrison
- Lisa Brounstein as Mama Cass Elliot
- Adam Tomei as Frank Zappa
- Allison Lange as Mary Kaylan
- Fiona Loewi as Sue Canon

== Production ==
"It's an absolutely true story," Kaylan said. "It was our first trip to London, and we met Graham Nash, Donovan, the Rolling Stones, and the Beatles—who played us Sgt. Pepper's Lonely Hearts Club Band before it was released—all on the same night! I wound up eating dinner with Hendrix at 4 a.m. and getting violently ill and puking all over his red velvet suit!"

== Reception ==
My Dinner with Jimi received the best screenplay award at the 2003 Slamdunk Film Festival in Park City, Utah, and was well received when it was shown as part of the Santa Monica Film Festival.

On the review aggregator website Rotten Tomatoes, 40% of 5 critics' reviews are positive, with an average rating of 5.1/10.
