= Jerzy Moes =

Polish film and television actor (1935–2019)

Jerzy Moes (Jerzy Michal Moes; 29 September 1935 – 27 April 2019) was a Polish film and television actor.

== Biography ==
Moes was born in Warsaw, the sixth son of ten children of Aleksander Moes and his wife Barbara Sobańska (Junosza coat of arms). He is also the grandson of Aleksander Juliusz Moes (1856–1928), a Polish landowner and industrialist from Silesia, and a nephew of Władysław Moes (1900–1986).

== Filmography ==
- Lotna (1959)
- How I Unleashed World War II (1970)
- Dzieciol (1971)
- Zamach stanu (1980)

Source.

== Bibliography ==
- Mazierska, Ewa & Ostrowska, Elżbieta. Women in Polish Cinema. Berghahn Books, 2006.
