= Love and Death on Long Island =

- Directed by: Richard Kwietniowski
- Written by: Richard Kwietniowski
- Based on: Love and Death on Long Island by Gilbert Adair
- Produced by: Steve Clark Hall; Christopher Zimmer
- Starring: John Hurt; Jason Priestley; Fiona Loewi; Sheila Hancock; Harvey Atkin; Gawn Grainger; Elizabeth Quinn; Maury Chaykin
- Cinematography: Oliver Curtis
- Edited by: Susan Shipton
- Music by: The Insects; Richard Grassby-Lewis
- Production companies: Lions Gate Films; BBC Films; Imagex; Skyline Films; Telefilm Canada; British Screen
- Distributed by: Cinepix Film Properties (Canada); Pathé Distribution (United Kingdom)
- Release dates: May 11, 1997 (Cannes Film Festival); March 6, 1998 (United States); July 3, 1998 (United Kingdom)
- Running time: 93 minutes
- Countries: United Kingdom; Canada
- Language: English
- Budget: £2,300,874
- Box office: $3 million

Love and Death on Long Island is a 1997 British-Canadian film adapted from Gilbert Adair's 1990 novel of the same name, directed by Richard Kwietniowski and starring Jason Priestley, John Hurt, Fiona Loewi, Sheila Hancock and Anne Reid. The storyline of obsession somewhat resembles that of Death in Venice.

== Plot ==
Giles De'Ath (John Hurt) is a British writer who doesn't use or understand anything modern. One day, he forgets his keys and locks himself out of his flat. It begins to rain, so he goes to see an E. M. Forster movie but, instead, accidentally enters the wrong theatre and sees the teen film Hotpants College II starring Ronnie Bostock (Jason Priestley). He becomes instantly infatuated with Ronnie's beauty and becomes obsessed with the young actor. He goes to his movies in the cinema, buys teen magazines and cuts out pictures of him, and buys a VCR and TV in order to play rented video tapes of his movies. He lets his housekeeper come into his office less and less, so that he can do these things undisturbed.

As his infatuation grows, it becomes obvious to those around him that Giles is becoming increasingly disturbed, though they don't know why. His friend and agent suggests that he take a holiday.

Giles sets out to meet Ronnie on Long Island. He flies to Long Island and takes a train to Ronnie's home town where he takes a motel room for several weeks. He searches the town for Ronnie – unsuccessfully at first – but finally spots Ronnie's girlfriend and follows her to the supermarket. Giles rams his shopping cart into her to force an introduction and invents a story about his god-daughter, Abigail, being in love with Ronnie. The girlfriend, Audrey (Fiona Loewi), is seemingly glad to have found a fan-base for Ronnie in England, and spends the day talking to Giles. She then tells him that she and Ronnie will invite him over at another time, and they can talk about Ronnie's career.

Eventually Giles becomes a regular visitor at Ronnie and Audrey's house. Ronnie is flattered by Giles, and Giles is able to stay longer in his presence by claiming that he will write a new script for Ronnie, one that better suits his acting abilities. Audrey becomes suspicious of Giles's motives regarding Ronnie, and she tells Giles that she is taking Ronnie to see her parents for an extended visit. Giles is very upset, and in a last-ditch effort confronts Ronnie and tells him how he feels about him. He says that many artists have had younger male lovers, and that Ronnie should split up with Audrey because it is obvious to him (Giles) that it won't last. Ronnie rejects Giles but seems genuinely concerned for him. The film ends with a screening of Ronnie's next film: another Hotpants College movie where he quotes Walt Whitman at his mother's funeral as written by Giles. What happens to Giles in the end is not shown.

== Cast ==
- John Hurt - Giles De'Ath
- Jason Priestley - Ronnie Bostock
- Fiona Loewi - Audrey
- Sheila Hancock - Mrs. Barker
- Harvey Atkin - Lou
- Gawn Grainger - Henry
- Elizabeth Quinn - Mrs. Reed
- Maury Chaykin - Irving 'Irv' Buckmuller
- Linda Busby - Mrs. Abbott
- Bill Leadbitter - Eldridge
- Anne Reid - Maureen (as Ann Reid)
- Danny Webb - Video Assistant (as Daniel Webb)
- Andrew Barrow - Harry
- Dean Gariss - Rob
- Robert McKewley - Video Salesman
- Jeffrey Coleman - Extra

== Production ==
The film has a musical score by Richard Grassby-Lewis. It was filmed in Nova Scotia.

== Release and distribution ==
The film was screened in the Un Certain Regard section at the 1997 Cannes Film Festival. It was picked up by Cinepix Film Properties after its premiere at the Festival. It opened on 6 screens on March 6, 1998, including 3 screens in New York City and 2 in Los Angeles, distributed by Lionsgate.

== Reception ==
=== Critical response ===
On Metacritic the film has a score of 80% based on reviews from 19 critics, indicating "generally favorable reviews". On Rotten Tomatoes the film has an 87% rating from 38 reviews.

Critic Roger Ebert gave the film three and a half stars and praised Hurt for giving De'Ath "a dignity...that transcends any snickering amusement at his infatuation. Jonathan Rosenbaum of The Chicago Reader called the film "perfectly realized, beautifully acted [and] sweetly hilarious...a witty, canny meditation on the power of pop culture in general and the rationalizations of cinephilia and film criticism in particular. What makes it perhaps even better than Adair’s clever novel...is the beautiful balance of humane sympathies Kwietniowski achieves; at no point does the foolishness or vanity of either character wipe out our sense of his dignity, and Fiona Loewi is no less touching as the movie star’s girlfriend." And Mark Caro of the Chicago Tribune also gave the film three and a half stars and called it "a bewitching comedy about what happens when Giles opens himself up to the modern world -- and his own sexual inclinations," adding that it's "charming, caustic, touching and vaguely creepy." Caro singled out Hurt for capturing "the ridiculousness of Giles' mission without ever sacrificing his dignity. It's a performance in which you marvel at the details: the contrast between his haughty manner outside and his private embarrassed laughter as he watches a Bostock video in which a biker is catapulted into a manure pile; his startled reaction to a car that robotically warns, "You are standing too close to this vehicle"; the way he flinches when a close-up of a mortally wounded Bostock character cuts to a shot of a priest, as if Giles had forgotten that the precious image on his TV screen was not fixed there." Caro also lauded director Kwietniowski for showing "a gentle touch in portraying Giles' folly and satirizing British stuffiness and American anti-intellectualism."

=== Box office ===
The film grossed $78,151 in its opening weekend, the number one exclusive release in New York and Los Angeles for the weekend. It went on to gross $2,581,012 at the box office in the United States and Canada. In the United Kingdom, the film grossed £0.4 million ($0.7 million).
