= Evadne Mount trilogy =

Trilogy by Gilbert Adair

The Evadne Mount trilogy is a series of books written by Gilbert Adair featuring mystery-writer-cum-sleuth Evadne Mount and referencing novels by Agatha Christie.

- The Act of Roger Murgatroyd (2006) – a murder mystery set in the 1930s on Dartmoor
- A Mysterious Affair of Style (2007) – another whodunit set in post-war London
- And Then There Was No One (2009) – a postmodern wrap-up of the trilogy set in 2011.
