= The Most Beautiful Boy in the World =

2021 documentary film about Björn Andrésen

- theatrical poster
- Directed by: Kristina Lindström; Kristian Petri
- Written by: Kristina Lindström; Kristian Petri
- Produced by: Stina Gardell
- Starring: Björn Andrésen; Riyoko Ikeda; Hajime Sawatari; Annike Andresen; Ann Lagerström
- Cinematography: Erik Vallsten
- Edited by: Dino Jonsäter; Hanna Lejonqvist
- Music by: Filip Leyman; Anna von Hausswolff
- Production companies: Mantaray Film; SVT; Jonas Gardell Produktion; ZDF/Arte; Filminverstering i Örebro
- Distributed by: Triart Film (Sweden); missingFILMs (Germany, Austria, Switzerland and Liechtenstein)
- Release date: 29 January 2021 (2021 Sundance Film Festival)
- Running time: 93 minutes
- Countries: Sweden; Germany
- Languages: Swedish; English; French; Italian; Japanese

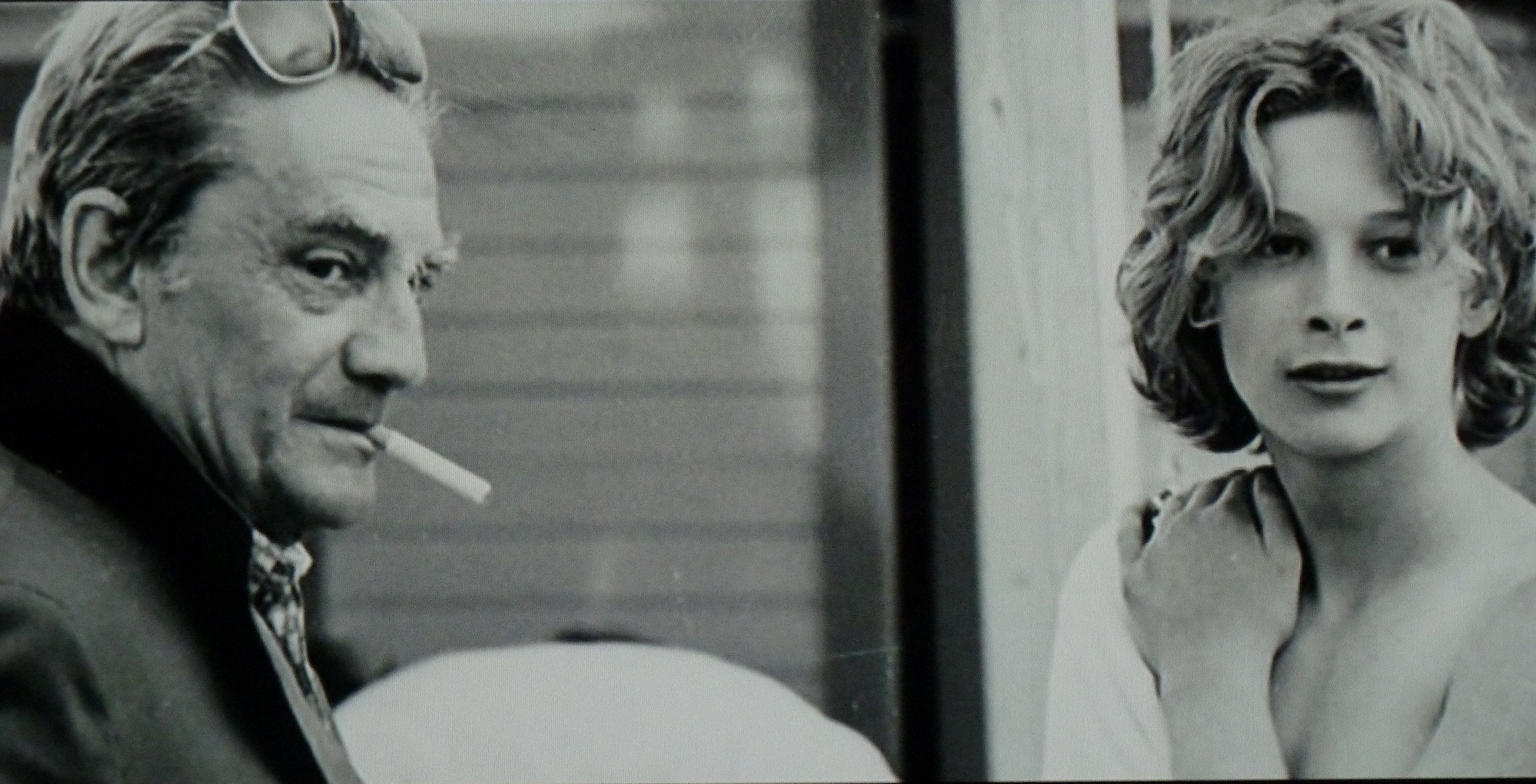
Luchino Visconti and Björn Andrésen on the set of Death in Venice

The Most Beautiful Boy in the World (Swedish: Världens vackraste pojke) is a 2021 Swedish documentary film about Björn Andrésen and the effects of fame thrust upon him when he appeared in Luchino Visconti's 1971 film Death in Venice. Andrésen was just 16 when the film came out, and was unprepared for instantly becoming an international celebrity.

The title of the documentary derives from a remark that Visconti made about Andrésen at the premiere of Death in Venice in London.

The Most Beautiful Boy in the World premiered at the 2021 Sundance Film Festival on January 29, 2021. It received a nomination for the World Cinema Documentary Grand Jury Prize at the festival. The film was released in US theaters on September 24, 2021.

== Reception ==
=== Critical response ===
On Rotten Tomatoes, the documentary holds an approval rating of 78% based on 54 reviews, with an average rating of 7.1/10. The website's critics consensus reads, "The Most Beautiful Boy in the World tells an undeniably familiar cautionary tale, but it's no less unbearably tragic in the telling."

== See also ==
- The Beautiful Boy – 2003 book by Germaine Greer
