= The Act of Roger Murgatroyd =

2006 novel by Gilbert Adair

- Author: Gilbert Adair
- Language: English
- Genre: Mystery novel
- Publisher: Faber and Faber
- Publication date: 2006
- Publication place: United Kingdom
- Pages: 286
- ISBN: 978-0-571-22637-5
- OCLC: 69484329
- Dewey Decimal: 823/.914 21
- LC Class: PR6051.D287 A65 2006
- Followed by: A Mysterious Affair of Style

The Act of Roger Murgatroyd: An Entertainment is a whodunit mystery novel by Scottish novelist Gilbert Adair first published in 2006. Set in the 1930s and written in the vein of an Agatha Christie novel, it has all the classic ingredients of a 1930s mystery and is, according to the author, "at one and the same time, a celebration, a parody and a critique not only of Agatha Christie but of the whole Golden Age of English whodunits", but also "a whodunit in its own right, so that those readers who were completely uninterested in literary games of the so-called postmodern type could nevertheless settle down comfortably with a good, gripping and intentionally old-fashioned thriller." The Act of Roger Murgatroyd is also a "locked room mystery" and is also a part of Adair's Evadne Mount trilogy.

The title alludes to two of Agatha Christie's works: her breakthrough novel, The Murder of Roger Ackroyd, and a character (Amy Murgatroyd) from a later tale, A Murder is Announced. Furthermore, there are clear elements which highlight Christie's influence. There are many more references to prominent crime writers and their works, including, tongue-in-cheek, an anachronistic allusion to critic Edmund Wilson's 1945 essay, "Who Cares Who Killed Roger Ackroyd?".

== Plot summary ==
Colonel ffolkes and his wife Mary have invited a few house guests to spend the Christmas holidays at their remote country seat on Dartmoor. Selina ffolkes, the Colonel's 21-year-old daughter, arrives on Christmas Eve with two others: Donald Duckworth, a young American art student; and Raymond Gentry, an ill-mannered gossip columnist who, uninvited and slightly drunk, soon gets on everyone's nerves. The whole action of the novel takes place on Boxing Day when, early in the morning, Gentry is found murdered in the attic. Snowed in and unable to call the police, the party decide to ask their neighbour, a retired Chief Inspector with Scotland Yard, for help. The latter agrees but finds a rival sleuth in Evadne Mount, one of the house guests and a celebrated author of whodunits in her own right. When the Chief Inspector and Mount start their preliminary investigation of the crime, it soon turns out that each of the guests has a skeleton in the cupboard.

== See also ==
- The Evadne Mount trilogy (The Act of Roger Murgatroyd, A Mysterious Affair of Style, and And Then There Was No One)
