= Death in Venice (film) =

1971 film by Luchino Visconti

- Italian theatrical release poster
- Italian: Morte a Venezia
- Directed by: Luchino Visconti
- Screenplay by: Luchino Visconti; Nicola Badalucco
- Based on: Death in Venice by Thomas Mann
- Produced by: Luchino Visconti
- Starring: Dirk Bogarde; Björn Andrésen; Mark Burns; Romolo Valli; Nora Ricci; Marisa Berenson; Carole André; Silvana Mangano
- Cinematography: Pasqualino De Santis
- Edited by: Ruggero Mastroianni
- Production companies: Alfa Cinematografica; PECF
- Distributed by: Dear International (Italy); Warner Bros. (International)
- Release dates: 1 March 1971 (London premiere); 5 March 1971 (Italy); 4 June 1971 (France)
- Running time: 130 minutes
- Countries: Italy; France
- Languages: Italian; English
- Budget: $2 million

Death in Venice (Italian: Morte a Venezia) is a 1971 historical drama film directed and produced by Italian filmmaker Luchino Visconti, and adapted by Visconti and Nicola Badalucco from the 1912 novella of the same name by German author Thomas Mann. It stars Dirk Bogarde as Gustav von Aschenbach and Björn Andrésen as Tadzio, with supporting roles played by Mark Burns, Marisa Berenson, and Silvana Mangano, and was filmed in Technicolor by Pasqualino De Santis. The soundtrack consists of selections from Gustav Mahler's third and fifth symphonies, but characters in the film also perform pieces by Franz Lehár, Ludwig van Beethoven, and Modest Mussorgsky. Preceded by The Damned (1969) and followed by Ludwig (1973), the film is the second part of Visconti's thematic "German Trilogy".

The film premiered in London on 1 March 1971, and was entered into the 24th Cannes Film Festival. It received positive reviews from critics and won several accolades, including, at the 25th British Academy Film Awards, the awards for Best Cinematography, Best Production Design, Best Costume Design, and Best Sound, in addition to nominations for Best Film, Best Direction, and Best Actor in a Leading Role for Dirk Bogarde. For his work on the film, Visconti won the David di Donatello Award for Best Director.

Retrospectively, Death in Venice was ranked the 235th greatest film of all time in the 2012 Sight & Sound critics' poll, the 14th greatest arthouse film of all time by The Guardian in 2010, and the 27th greatest LGBT film of all time in a 2016 poll by the British Film Institute. It is the 209th greatest film of all time as per the list aggregation site They Shoot Pictures, Don't They?

== Plot ==
Composer Gustav von Aschenbach travels to Venice for rest, due to serious health concerns. During his ship's arrival, an importunate and conspicuously made-up older man approaches Aschenbach with suggestive gestures and phrases, whereupon Aschenbach turns away indignantly. Aschenbach takes quarters in the beachside Grand Hotel des Bains on the Venice Lido. While awaiting dinner in the hotel's lobby, he notices a group of young Poles with their governess and mother, and becomes spellbound by the handsome boy Tadzio, whose casual dress and demeanor distinguishes him from his modest sisters. Tadzio's image causes Aschenbach to recall an increasingly emotional and heated conversation with his friend and student Alfred, in which they question whether beauty is created artistically or naturally, and if beauty, as a natural phenomenon, is superior to art.

In the following days, Aschenbach observes Tadzio playing and swimming. When he manages to get close to the boy in the hotel's elevator, Tadzio seems to throw a seductive look at Aschenbach while exiting the lift. Returning to his room in an agitated state, Aschenbach remembers a particularly personal argument with Alfred, and he hesitantly decides to leave Venice. However, when his luggage is misplaced at the train station, he is secretly relieved and delighted at the prospect of returning to the hotel in order to be near Tadzio again. Before his return, he sees an emaciated man collapse in the station concourse, and, when he attempts to investigate this, the flattering hotel manager speaks in a dismissive manner of exaggerated scandals in the foreign press.

Aschenbach adopts Tadzio as an artistic muse, but fails to master his passion for him and frequently loses himself in daydreams of the unattainable boy. When a travel agent on Saint Mark's Square hesitantly reports to Aschenbach that a cholera epidemic is sweeping through Venice, Aschenbach's attention falters and he fantasizes about warning Tadzio's mother of the danger while stroking her son's head. Though Aschenbach and Tadzio never converse, Tadzio notices he is being watched and responds with an occasional returned glance. Aschenbach follows Tadzio and his family to St Mark's Basilica, where he observes him praying. He gets a makeover from a chatty hairdresser, giving him a resemblance to the old man who had pestered him upon his arrival. He pursues Tadzio's family again, until he collapses near a well and bursts into a pained laughter. Back in his hotel room, Aschenbach dreams of a disastrous performance in Munich and Alfred's accusations afterward.

When Aschenbach learns that Tadzio's family will be leaving the hotel, he weakly makes his way to the nearly-deserted beach, where he watches with concern as Tadzio's game with an older boy degenerates into a wrestling match. Upon recovering, Tadzio strolls away and wades into the sea to the enraptured tones of Mahler's Adagietto. He slowly turns and looks toward the dying Aschenbach, then raises his arm and points off into the distance. Aschenbach tries to rise, but collapses in his deck chair, dead.

== Cast ==
- Dirk Bogarde as Gustav von Aschenbach
- Björn Andrésen as Thaddeus "Tadzio" Moes
- Silvana Mangano as Mrs. Moes, Tadzio's mother
- Romolo Valli as the hotel manager
- Mark Burns as Alfred, Gustav's friend
- Nora Ricci as Tadzio's governess
- Marisa Berenson as Frau von Aschenbach, Gustav's wife
- Carole André as Esmeralda, a prostitute
- Leslie French as the travel agent
- Franco Fabrizi as the barber
- Sergio Garfagnoli as Jasiu, a Polish youth
- Dominique Darel as an English tourist
- Mascia Predit as a Russian tourist
- Howard Nelson Rubien as an English tourist (uncredited)
- Bill Vanders as the stationmaster (uncredited)

== Adaptation ==
In Mann's novella, the character of Aschenbach is an author, but, for the film, Visconti made him a composer. This allows the musical score, in particular the Adagietto from Gustav Mahler's Fifth Symphony (which opens and closes the film) and sections from Mahler's Third Symphony, to represent Aschenbach's work. Apart from this change, and the addition of the scenes in which Aschenbach and a musician friend debate the degraded aesthetics of his music, the film is relatively faithful to the book.

== Production ==
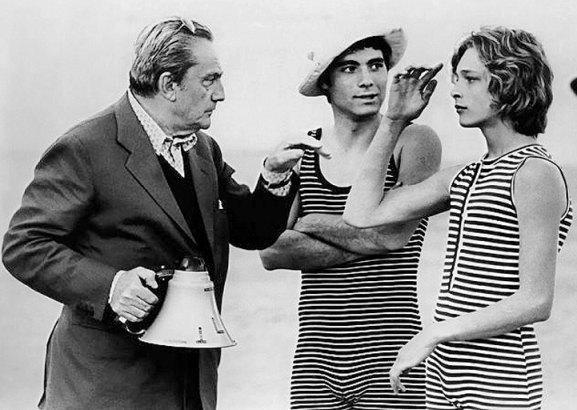
From left to right: Luchino Visconti, Sergio Garfagnoli, Björn Andresen

In the second volume of his autobiography, Snakes and Ladders, Dirk Bogarde recounts how the film crew created his character's deathly white skin for the final scenes of the film, just as he dies. The makeup department tried various face paints and creams, but none were satisfactory, as they smeared. When a suitable cream was finally found and the scenes were shot, Bogarde recalls that his face began to burn terribly. The tube of cream was located, and, written on the side, was: "Keep away from eyes and skin". The director had ignored this warning and had various members of the film crew test it out on small patches of their skin, before finally having it applied to Bogarde's face.

In another volume of his memoirs, An Orderly Man, Bogarde relates that, after the finished film was screened for them by Visconti in Los Angeles, the Warner Bros. executives wanted to write off the project, fearing it would be banned in the United States for obscenity because of its subject matter. They eventually relented when a gala premiere was organized in London, with Elizabeth II and Princess Anne attending, to gather funds for the sinking Italian city of Venice.

=== Björn Andrésen ===
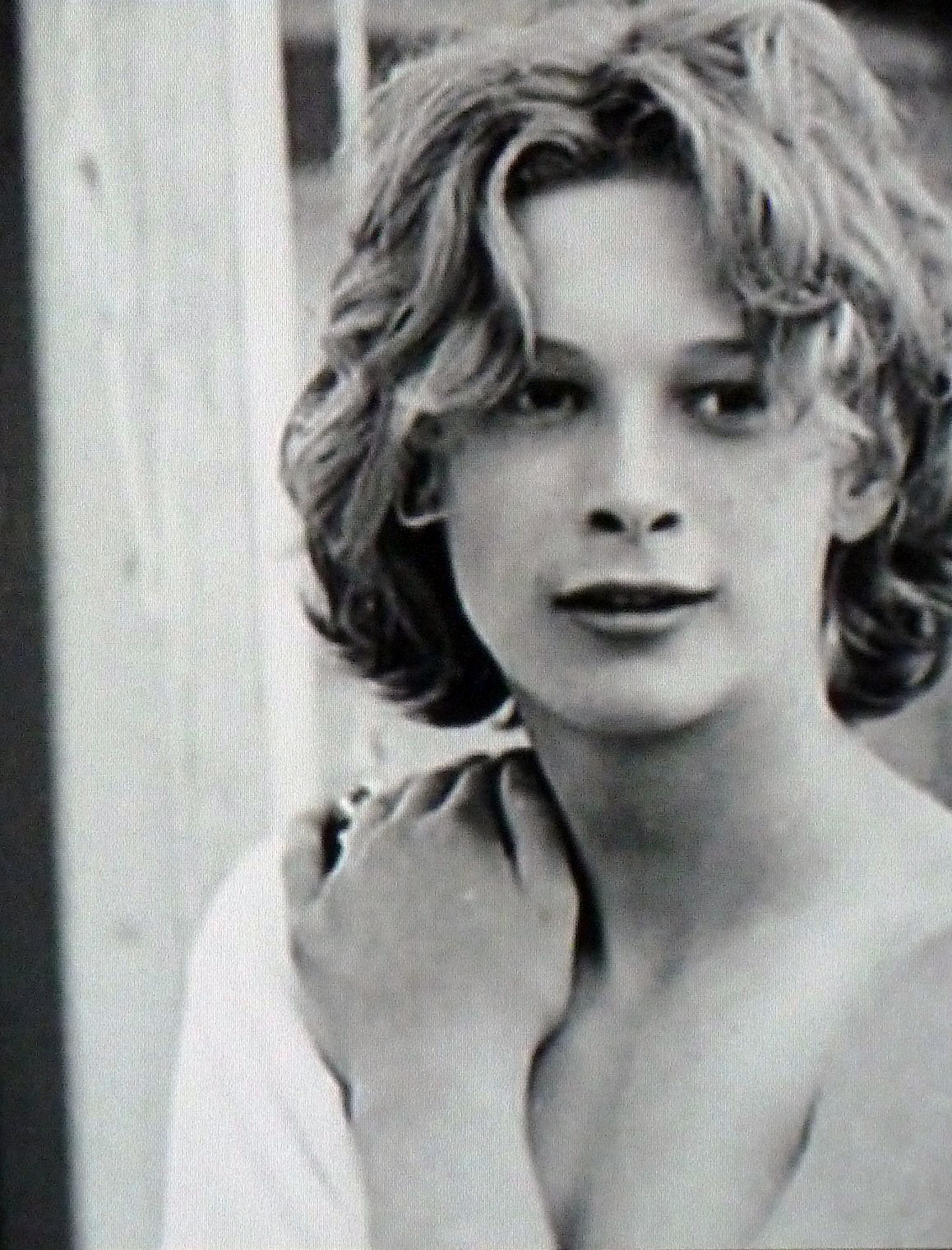
Björn Andrésen as Tadzio

In 2003, Björn Andrésen gave an interview to The Guardian in which he expressed his dislike of the fame Death in Venice brought him and discussed how he sought to distance himself from the objectifying image he acquired by playing Tadzio. He stated that he disapproved of the film's subject matter, as "Adult love for adolescents is something that I am against in principle. Emotionally perhaps, and intellectually, I am disturbed by it – because I have some insight into what this kind of love is about", and also recounted attending the film's premiere at the Cannes Film Festival: "I was just 16 and Visconti and the team took me to a gay nightclub. Almost all the crew were gay. The waiters at the club made me feel very uncomfortable. They looked at me uncompromisingly as if I was a nice meaty dish...it was the first of many such encounters".

In 2021, Juno Films released The Most Beautiful Boy in the World. It premiered at the Sundance Film Festival on January 29, 2021.

== Critical reception ==
On the review aggregator website Rotten Tomatoes, 70% of 27 critics' reviews are positive. The website's consensus reads: "Luchino Visconti's Death in Venice is one of his emptier meditations on beauty, but fans of the director will find his knack for sumptuous visuals remains intact."

Derek Malcolm, in a 1971 review of the film for The Guardian wrote: "It is a very slow, precise, and beautiful film, ... an immensely formidable achievement, engrossing in spite of any doubts".

For Time magazine in 1971, Stefan Kanfer reviewed the film negatively writing at the conclusion of his review, "this film is worse than mediocre; it is corrupt and distorted. It is one thing to change an author’s lines or his characters. It is quite another to destroy his soul (...) it is irredeemably, unforgivably gay."

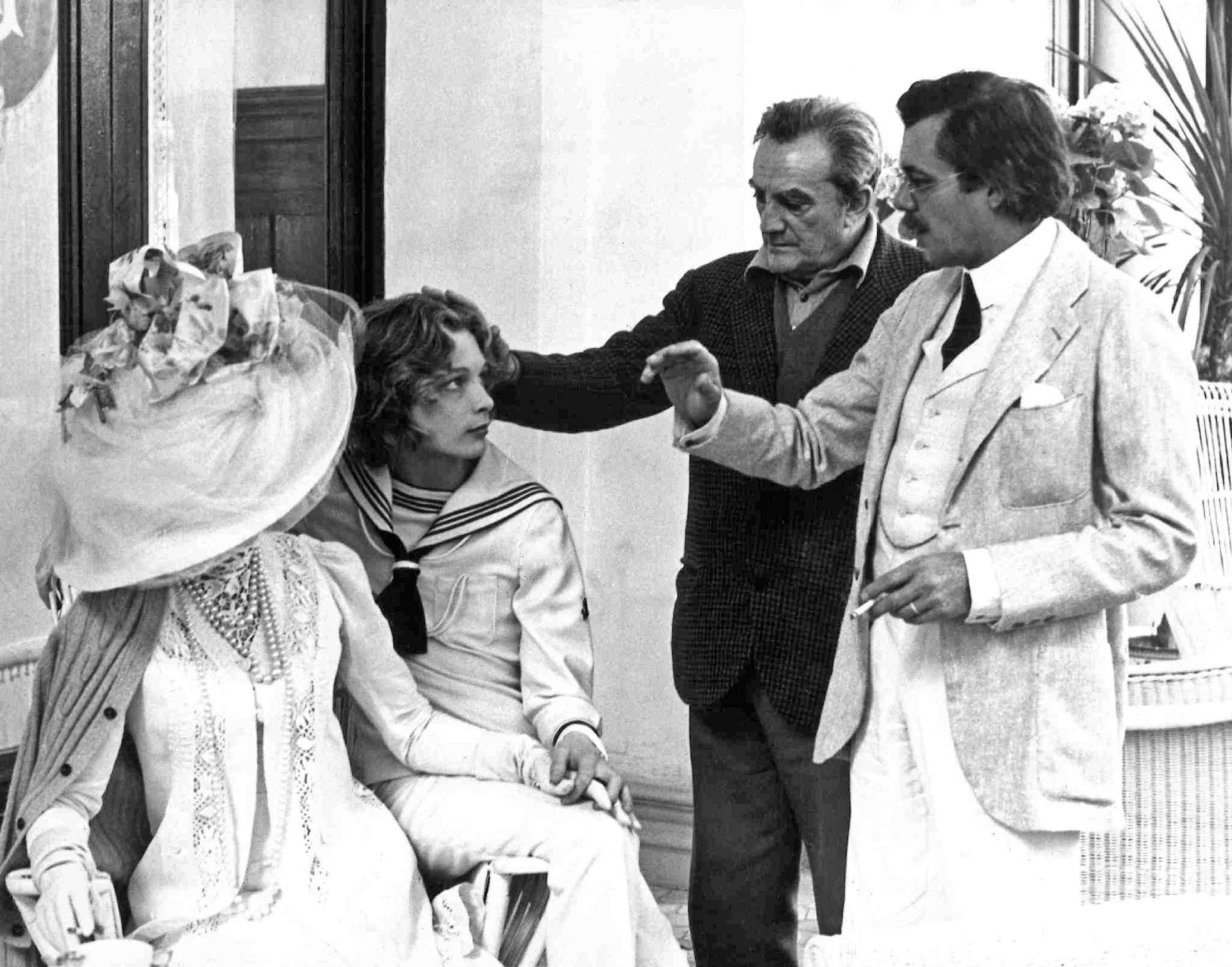
Photograph from the principal cinematography with Silvana Mangano (face not visible), Björn Andrésen, Luchino Visconti and Dirk Bogarde.

Roger Ebert wrote: "I think the thing that disappoints me most about Luchino Visconti's Death in Venice is its lack of ambiguity. Visconti has chosen to abandon the subtleties of the Thomas Mann novel and present us with a straightforward story of homosexual love, and although that's his privilege, I think he has missed the greatness of Mann's work somewhere along the way".

Film historian Lawrence J. Quirk wrote in his study The Great Romantic Films (1974): "Some shots of Björn Andrésen, the Tadzio of the film, could be extracted from the frame and hung on the walls of the Louvre or the Vatican in Rome". He stated that Tadzio does not represent just a pretty youngster as an object of perverted lust, but that novelist Mann and director-screenwriter Visconti intended him as a symbol of beauty in the realm of Michelangelo's David or Leonardo da Vinci's Mona Lisa, the beauty that moved Dante to "seek ultimate aesthetic catharsis in the distant figure of Beatrice".

In a 2003 review of the film for The Guardian, Peter Bradshaw hailed Dirk Bogarde's performance as one of the greatest of all time, concluding: "This is exalted film-making".

Writer Will Aitken published Death in Venice: A Queer Film Classic, a critical analysis of the film, in 2011 as part of Arsenal Pulp Press's Queer Film Classics series.

On September 1, 2018, the film was screened at the 75th Venice International Film Festival in the Venice Classics section. The Criterion Collection released a remastered edition of the film on Blu-Ray and DVD on February 19, 2019.

=== Awards and honors ===
Award	Year	Category	Nominee	Result
Academy Award	1972	Best Costume Design	Piero Tosi	Nominated
BAFTA Award	1972	Best Film		Nominated
BAFTA Award	1972	Best Direction	Luchino Visconti	Nominated
BAFTA Award	1972	Best Actor in a Leading Role	Dirk Bogarde	Nominated
BAFTA Award	1972	Best Cinematography	Pasqualino De Santis	Won
BAFTA Award	1972	Best Production Design	Ferdinando Scarfiotti	Won
BAFTA Award	1972	Best Costume Design	Piero Tosi	Won
BAFTA Award	1972	Best Sound	Vittorio Trentino, Giuseppe Muratori	Won
Cannes Film Festival	1971	25th Anniversary Award (Note: This was a special award created to make it possible to honor both this film and Joseph Losey's The Go-Between, which won the Palme d'Or at that year's festival, as well as to recognize Visconti's entire filmic body of work.)	Luchino Visconti	Won
Cannes Film Festival	1971	Palme d'Or	Luchino Visconti	Nominated
David di Donatello	1971	Best Director	Luchino Visconti	Won
French Syndicate of Cinema Critics	1972	Best Foreign Film		Won
Kinema Junpo Award	1972	Best Foreign-Language Film		Won
Kinema Junpo Award	1972	Best Foreign-Language Director	Luchino Visconti	Won
Nastro d'Argento	1972	Best Director	Luchino Visconti	Won
Nastro d'Argento	1972	Best Supporting Actor	Romolo Valli	Nominated
Nastro d'Argento	1972	Best Supporting Actress	Silvana Mangano	Won
Nastro d'Argento	1972	Best Cinematography	Pasqualino De Santis	Won
Nastro d'Argento	1972	Best Production Design	Ferdinando Scarfiotti	Won
Nastro d'Argento	1972	Best Costume Design	Piero Tosi	Won
National Board of Review	1972	Top Ten Films		Won
Sant Jordi Award	1973	Best Foreign Film	Luchino Visconti	Won
