= Alice Through the Needle's Eye =

1984 novel by Gilbert Adair

Alice Through the Needle's Eye: A Third Adventure for Lewis Carroll's Alice
- First edition
- Author: Gilbert Adair
- Language: English
- Genre: Fantasy
- Publisher: Macmillan
- Publication date: 1984
- Publication place: United States
- Media type: Print (Hardcover)
- Pages: 184
- ISBN: 0-525-24303-8
- OCLC: 11891346
- LC Class: PZ7.A1859 Al 1984
- Preceded by: Alice's Adventures in Wonderland (1865) and Through the Looking-Glass (1871)

Alice Through the Needle's Eye: A Third Adventure for Lewis Carroll's Alice is a 1984 novel by Gilbert Adair that pays tribute to the work of Lewis Carroll through a further adventure of the eponymous fictional heroine, told in Carroll's surrealistic style.

== Plot ==
Alice spends a winter day continuously failing to thread a sewing needle. When she takes an extremely close look through the eye of the needle, she sees an unknown world on the other side, and finds herself falling through the needle's eye into this world.

She falls into a haystack accompanied by frightened Country Mouse. She makes her way out of the haystack and continues in the direction of an inviting beach. Alice does not travel far before she meets two cats that are joined at the tail. The cats, called Ping and Pang, inform Alice that they are "Siamese-Twin Cats". They recite the poem "The Sands of Dee"; Pang forgets the last word of the poem, prompting a duel between them. But before their duel begins, the sky darkens and rains down cats and dogs. When the peculiar shower of animals has stopped, Ping and Pang realize that they must attend the "vote." Alice follows them to find out what the vote is about. Along the way, she meets an Elephant who gives her a ride to "Hide-and-Seek Park." Here, a politician Emu gives a speech which is so brief that Alice misses it entirely. Soon after this, the vote transforms into an auction, and with the final cry of, "Going...going...gone!" everyone abruptly vanishes.

A whale she met at the auction, called the Grampus, insists Alice accompany him to board a train. Along the ride, Alice's surroundings transform into a study room. She exits this room and ventures towards a hill she spots in the distance. Here, she finds two 'stick figure people' who she soon identifies as Jack and Jill carrying pails of eels. Jack orders Alice to deliver his pail to Llanfairpwllgwyngyllgogerychwyrndrobwllllantysiliogogogoch, so she sets off to do so. She reaches a maze and quickly becomes deeply lost. She eventually comes across the center of the maze where a large congregation of animals are also hopelessly lost.

Alice is volunteered by the animals to go into a rabbit hole which the cluster of animals within the maze believe leads out. When going down the hole, she feels as if she is falling sideways and soon is rocketed out of the exit hole like a canon. She finds herself in a queue between two small buildings, occupied in part by the Red and White Queens from her previous adventures. Every time they work their way up the queue to one of the small buildings, it closes its operations and directs them to visit the opposite building instead. The length of the queue joining both buildings gets smaller and smaller until Alice finally manages to actually speak to the owner of one of the buildings, who is a butterfly still in his chrysalis. He sells her a postage stamp and flutters away.

As she inspects the postage stamp, she suddenly finds herself in a restaurant called The King's Head. When a waiter arrives to take her order, Alice chooses "Swan Pie and Greens" from the menu, which summons a living swan to approach and prepare itself to be cooked alive. Before anything can be done, the group is interrupted by a voice declaring the "Grand Opening of Parliament!"

Alice makes her way to a solemn procession, including the Grampus, making their way to the Hall of Parliament, accompanied by a swarm of personified letters of the alphabet. When they arrive, the Emu emerges and hears the complaints of a Lord X, who argues for better empowerment of the later letters (V, W, X, Y and Z). The debate escalates into a violent and senseless battle. When Alice tries to intervene, the letters turn on her, prompting her to awake in a panic.

Realizing it was only a dream, Alice talks in a hush to her sleeping cat about her adventures.

== Characters ==
These are the main characters listed in order of appearance

- Alice Liddell
- Country Mouse
- Ping
- Pang
- Grampus
- Hairdresser
- Jack
- Jill
- Welsh Rabbit
- Otter
- Kangaroo
- Red Queen
- White Queen
- Frog Waiter
- Swan
- Mr. Snake
- Letter Lords

== Connections to Wonderland ==
There are several references and homages to Lewis Carroll's novels Alice's Adventures in Wonderland (1865) and Through the Looking-Glass (1871). For example, Dinah appears in the beginning, and there is once again a mouse within the plot. In the scene concerning the Llabyrinth, she chases a rabbit and encounters a hole which she must enter.

== Bibliography ==
- Adair, G. (1985) Alice Through the Needle's Eye: A Third Adventure for Lewis Carroll's Alice ISBN 0-330-29158-0
