= Władysław Moes =

Polish nobleman

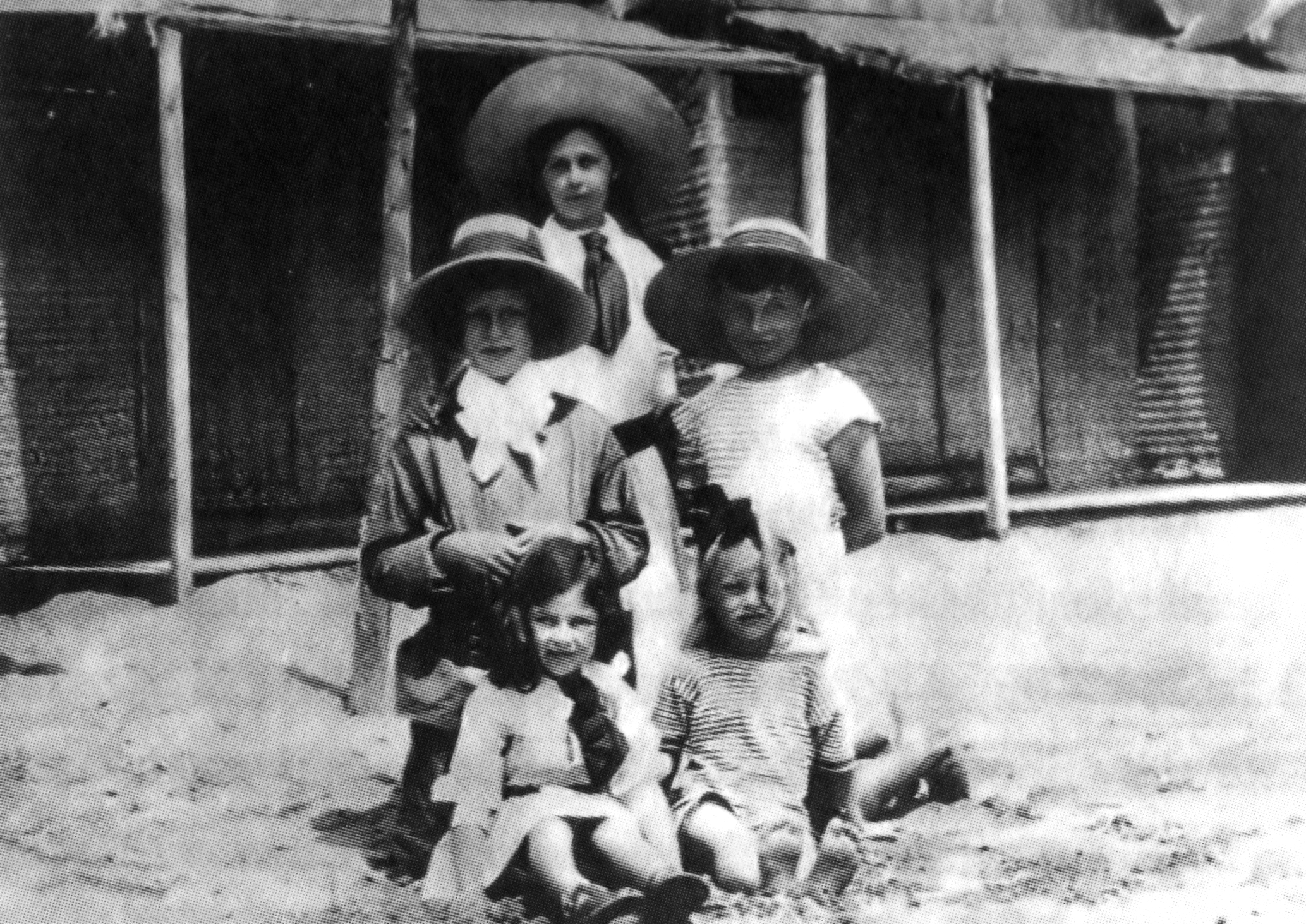
- Moes with his sisters and friend Jan Fudakowski in Venice, 1911
- Born: Władysław Gerard Jan Nepomuk Marya Moes; 17 November 1900; Wierbka, Congress Poland
- Died: 17 December 1986 (aged 86)
- Spouse: Anna Belina-Brzozowska (m. 1935)
- Relatives: Jerzy Moes (nephew)

Władysław Gerard Jan Nepomuk Marya Moes (17 November 1900 – 17 December 1986) was a Polish landowner who has been claimed as the inspiration for the character Tadzio in Thomas Mann’s novella Death in Venice.

== Early life ==
Władysław Moes was born in the Moes Palace near Wierbka, in southern Congress Poland. He was the second son of the six children of Aleksander Juliusz Moes (1856–1928), a large landowner, factory owner, and philanthropist, and his wife noblewoman Janina Miączyńska (1869–1946), whose family used the Suchekomnaty coat of arms. He was also the grandson of Christian August Moes (1810–1872), a Polish industrialist of Dutch origin.

In May 1911, on the advice of doctors, he spent a spring holiday with his family at the Lido in Venice, staying at the Grand Hotel des Bains. There, he allegedly attracted the attention of the German writer Thomas Mann, who used him as the inspiration for Tadzio – a character of his novella Death in Venice, published in 1912.

Katia Mann recalled that her husband's idea for the story came during a holiday at the Grand Hôtel des Bains in 1911:

All the details of the story... are taken from experience ... In the dining-room, on the very first day, we saw the Polish family, which looked exactly the way my husband described them: the girls were dressed rather stiffly and severely, and the very charming, beautiful boy of about 13 was wearing a sailor suit with an open collar and very pretty lacings. He caught my husband's attention immediately. This boy was tremendously attractive, and my husband was always watching him with his companions on the beach. He didn't pursue him through all of Venice—that he didn't do—but the boy did fascinate him, and he thought of him often...

Moes was taught by private tutors and later studied at Saint Stanislaus Kostka's Gymnasium in Warsaw. In 1920, Moes was a volunteer uhlan in the Polish-Soviet War. Later, he ran a landed estate and a horse farm in Udórz that he inherited from his father, who died in 1928.

== Marriage and later life ==
In 1935, he married a noblewoman, Anna Belina-Brzozowska (1911–1978), whose family used the Belina coat of arms. They had two children, Aleksander (1936–1955) and Maria (born 1946). He was also the uncle of the Polish film and television actor Jerzy Moes.

In 1939, after the German invasion of Poland, Moes fought as an officer in the ranks of the Polish Army Intelligence Brigade and he was awarded the Cross of Valour. He was taken prisoner in the Battle of the Bzura and sent to Oflag, where he spent almost six years. With the establishment of the communist regime in Poland in 1945, he was deprived of his entire property. He was forced to earn his living mainly as a translator and worked at the Iranian Embassy in Warsaw.

In 1964, Moes gave an interview to Andrzej Dołegowski, the Polish translator of Mann’s works, which was published in August 1965 in the German magazine Twen, revealing that he had been the inspiration for the writer’s character Tadzio in Death in Venice:

I am that boy! Yes, even then in Venice I was called Adzio or sometimes Władzio...But in the story I am named Tadzio...this is how the Master understood it...In the story I found everything described exactly, even my clothes, my behavior – good or bad – and the rough jokes I played on the sands with my friend.

I was considered to be a very beautiful child and women admired and kissed me when I walked along the promenade. Some of them sketched and painted me. But in my memories all that seemed insignificant to me. I had those childlike negligent manners shown by pampered early matured children now and again. In Death in Venice this plot is much better narrated than I myself could ever do. The writer must have been highly impressed by my unconventional clothes and he described them without missing a detail: a striped linen suit and a red bow-tie as well as my favorite blue jacket with gold buttons.

However, serious doubts about this identification were raised in an article in Der Spiegel in 2002, mainly because of the significant differences in age and physical appearance between the Tadzio figure of the novella and Moes.

During the last years of his life, Moes often stayed with his daughter Maria in France. He died in Warsaw and was buried in the Moes family plot in the graveyard on the hill of St Peter in Pilica, southern Poland.
