= A Closed Book (novel) =

Novel by Gilbert Adair

- Author: Gilbert Adair
- Language: English
- Genre: Novel, Novella
- Publisher: Faber & Faber
- Publication date: January 1999
- Publication place: United Kingdom
- Media type: Print (Hardback & Paperback)
- Pages: 258 pp
- ISBN: 978-0-571-20081-8
- OCLC: 41661966
- Dewey Decimal: 823/.914 21
- LC Class: PR6051.D287 C57 1999

A Closed Book is a short novel by Gilbert Adair, published in 2000.

The book starts with a slightly awkward meeting between a crotchety blind author and a sighted interviewee he seeks to employ as his assistant.

The narrative is presented almost entirely through dialogue between the two men, punctuated by fragments of the writer's diary. As the two men's relationship develops it becomes clear that both have something to hide.

A film based on the novel was released in 2010 for which Adair adapted his novel into a script.
