= A Closed Book (film) =

2010 film by Raúl Ruiz

- Directed by: Raúl Ruiz
- Written by: Gilbert Adair
- Based on: A Closed Book by Gilbert Adair
- Produced by: Andrew Somper
- Starring: Daryl Hannah; Tom Conti; Miriam Margolyes; Simon MacCorkindale; Elaine Paige
- Cinematography: Ricardo Aronovich
- Edited by: Sean Barton; Adrian Murray; Valeria Sarmiento
- Distributed by: Eyeline Entertainment
- Release date: 22 February 2010 (United Kingdom)
- Running time: 88 minutes
- Country: United Kingdom
- Language: English

A Closed Book (released as Blind Revenge in the United States) is a 2010 British film directed by Chilean filmmaker Raúl Ruiz, based on the 2000 novel of the same name by Gilbert Adair, about a blind author who employs an assistant to help him write his novels. Throughout the film the assistant starts to play crueler and crueler tricks on her employer. The film stars Daryl Hannah as assistant Jane Ryder, and Tom Conti as author Sir Paul. A Closed Book was filmed at Knebworth House in Hertfordshire, England.

== Plot ==
Sir Paul is an art critic and writer who was blinded in a car crash. He lives alone in a large mansion in the UK. He is looking for an amanuensis or "ghost writer" to help him write his final book, an autobiography, and interviews several unsuccessful candidates until Jane Ryder applies for the position. Because she is intelligent and forthright, Sir Paul hires her and explains that she will now be living in the house before introducing Mrs. Kilbride, the cook and housekeeper. He then goes on to divulge his claustrophobia and "terrific fear of the dark" despite his blindness, and asks that the lights be switched on at "exactly the same time as they would be in any normal house."

Jane begins to explore the mansion by herself, noting how much of the furniture is covered in white dust cloths, before stumbling upon a teddy bear with one eye. She picks up the bear and snaps the eye off of its face. A shot of a painting is then inexplicably shown along with the sounds of a child's laughter.

At breakfast, Sir Paul and Jane discuss their pet annoyances with Sir Paul getting disproportionately angry about Jane saying "no problem" repeatedly. He asks her to bring to his attention anything he does that she finds irritating. Jane mentions his saying "poor" as an adjective, describing it as patronizing. Sir Paul then tells Jane that he can both hear her smile and think. Sir Paul begins dictating his book, which he decides to call A Closed Book, to Jane while she types. Sir Paul again gets very angry at Jane for not taking his instructions. After they finish writing, Sir Paul asks Jane to buy a puzzle of a specific painting as a favor which she agrees to do. He later asks her to call his agent to deliver the news about his new book being in the works. Jane dials the phone and speaks with someone before telling Sir Paul that his agent is currently out of the country and not available. Things run smoothly until Jane starts changing things ever so slightly, like taking paintings out of their frames and turning them upside down. Her true purpose at the mansion starts to become even more questionable when she begins to lie to Sir Paul, claiming to be wearing a red gown while really wearing jeans and a shirt, and sets a few of his books ablaze in the fireplace. Sir Paul begins to question Jane's personal life, specifically her love life, but she divulges little and asks that the subject be changed. Sir Paul starts to suspect Jane when she sends Mrs. Kilbride home for a week without consulting him.

While singing in the bath, Sir Paul keeps hearing strange noises. On one occasion, Jane reassures him and, upon her departure, the audience is shown another shot of the teddy bear followed by a painting of a young girl playing with a teddybear and the sound of children's laughter.

Jane's lying and sneaking become more and more obvious as she lies to Sir Paul about Madonna dying and O. J. Simpson committing suicide. Suspicions are heightened further when Mrs. Kilbride returns to the house and finds a puzzle that Sir Paul asked Jane to purchase which turns out to be the wrong puzzle. This causes Sir Paul to lose trust in Jane as he wrote about the painting in his book. Jane assures Sir Paul that nothing of the sort will ever happen again. Later, Mrs. Killbride calls to inform them that her husband may have lung cancer and that she won't be able to work again for some time.

Sir Paul's suspicions are assuaged when an MP visits his house to persuade him to vote for the Conservatives. Because of her fear of Sir Paul, she responds positively to all of his questions, and she reads aloud what Jane has written in his book after he insists she do it for him. Fortunately for Jane, her transcription of his words on the computer are accurate. Jane later escalates her campaign against him, and one day she leaves a suit of armour lying on the floor, and displaces several desks and a number of books. She knows that Sir Paul will walk into them, which will cause him to trip and fall down the stairs. She then comes back into the house. Sir Paul dials his agent for the first time in the film and finds out that he was in fact at his office the whole time and had never taken a trip.

Eventually, Sir Paul realizes that Jane is attempting to kill him, and he has a confrontation with her in his bedroom. She tells him that her late husband, Ralph, had once had an art exhibition at a prestigious gallery, where he had been severely criticized by Sir Paul. It is revealed that the quick shots of paintings shown throughout the film are in fact the works of her late husband. Due to the subject material of his paintings, Ralph had been arrested and accused of being a pedophile. He later killed himself. After comparing Sir Paul to "a closed book," and declaring that she must destroy him the way he destroyed Ralph (I must destroy you the way you did to Ralph), Jane shoves him into a wardrobe and she leaves the house, with Sir Paul screaming after her. However, when she returns to the house out of guilt, and because she lacks the capacity to kill someone, Jane discovers that Sir Paul has escaped from the closet. He had called Mrs. Killbride with a phone that he had forgotten was in his pocket from a previous scene, telling her that he had locked himself in the wardrobe. Then, Sir Paul points a gun at Jane, and explains that Ralph killed himself because he could not stand the truth about himself, that he knew what Sir Paul had written about him was true. Sir Paul then confesses that he saw this "proxy child abuse" in the paintings because he saw his own secret in the paintings. Sir Paul, too, is a pedophile. He invites Jane to shoot him, but she leaves the house instead. As she drives away, Sir Paul shoots himself inside the mansion.

== Cast ==
- Tom Conti as Sir Paul, an author and art critic who was blinded in an accident.
- Daryl Hannah as Jane Ryder, a hired writing assistant to Sir Paul whose intentions become less clear as the story continues.
- Miriam Margolyes as Mrs. Kilbride, Sir Paul's cook and housekeeper.
- Simon MacCorkindale as Andrew Boles, Sir Paul's agent.
- Elaine Paige as Canvasser, a Conservative representative who visits Sir Paul's house.
- Ty Glaser as Jane's successor

== Production ==
The film's script was written by Gilbert Adair, author of the novel that the film was originally based upon.

When asked about the film during an interview with author Michael Goddard, who wrote The Cinema of Raúl Ruiz: Impossible Cartographies, director Ruiz said: "I had some problems with that from that maybe you know; it's that the way that films are produced in England is radically different from how films are produced in many other countries. In England, the filmmaker is a technician, this is different to a director, and I had a very funny letter at the beginning of the shooting, 'remember that this not a film of an auteur, (using the French word), we don't want that, we want a normal feature.' So I followed the script, you know the sermons, 'I serve to make the script, only the script and nothing but the script,' but then the script changed every day, it was changed by the actors, by the producer, by money problems, so I was following something that was not very clear, it was wit cloudy, and then I made a version and they started working with this version, I always try to make a film in such a way that you can edit only in one way, or sometimes in two but not more, and because the film had to be made in three weeks and something and so was fast, I have my alibi. I can do only that, I have no time for many cuts. So I have no close-ups, no shot-reverse shots, there were some, of course, but in a different way. So they could not finish that and they started changing the shots; [they changed] one shot from another and suddenly the film became weaker and weaker and lost all the energy. I saw the film, I have the original and I have this one and it's sort of deception, it's the only film where I had this experience."

This film was one of Ruiz's last before his death in 2011. It was released straight-to-DVD in the UK, Australia and New Zealand following its 2009 Cannes market premiere. Ruiz's first name in credits is given his seldom-used, non-Spanish spelling of Raoul, possibly due to the picture's British identity.

== Reception ==
Critical reception was overall poor, with a few exceptions. The Times gave it one (out of five) stars and called it an "atrocious, creepy little film". The Daily Telegraph gave it 2 out of 5 stars, stating, "A Closed Book feels less like a thriller than an aesthete’s tease". The Guardian also gave a poor review and only 2 out of 5 stars, describing it as "a silly story about a blind art critic". Perhaps the most scathing is a review from Time Out London which gave the film only 1 star, finding "Raul Ruiz's apologists have their work cut out for them."

Anthony Quinn of The Independent gave it 3 out of 5 stars stating that "its sheer unlikeliness is what also keeps you hanging in there." Leo Robson of Financial Times also gave the film 3 out of 5 stars, saying that "Events gradually turn Gothic, with things going bump in the night, as they often do in films containing blind characters or set in country houses, so here the fun is doubled, and it all culminates in a final twist that has to be seen to be disbelieved." On review aggregator Rotten Tomatoes the movie received a critical score of 14% out of 14 critics with an average rating of 3.9/10.
