= Fiona Loewi =

Canadian actress

- Born: 1975 (age 50–51); London, United Kingdom
- Education: McGill University; London Academy of Music and Dramatic Art
- Occupation: Actress

Fiona Loewi (born 1975) is a Canadian actress. She attended McGill University and the London Academy of Music and Dramatic Art. She is perhaps best known for her role in Love and Death on Long Island. She is the mother of three children and lives in Los Angeles, CA. She and her husband, Sandro Reinhardt, are co-owners of Cheebo, an American cuisine organic food restaurant in Los Angeles.

== Film ==
- National Lampoon's Senior Trip (1995)
- Love and Death on Long Island (1997)
- Blackheart (1998)
- Top of the Food Chain (1999)
- Buying the Cow (2001)
- My Dinner with Jimi (2003)
- Greed (2006)

== Television ==
- Once a Thief (1997) (guest star)
- Secret Agent Man (2000) (guest star)
- Drive Time Murders a.k.a. Breakfast with Dick and Dorothy (2001) (TV movie)
- Killer Bees! (2002) (TV movie)
- CSI:Miami (2007) (guest star)

== Awards and nominations ==
Year	Award	Category	Title of work	Result
2001	Canadian Comedy Award	Film - Pretty Funny Female Performance	Top of the Food Chain	Nominated
