= Wierbka =

- Village
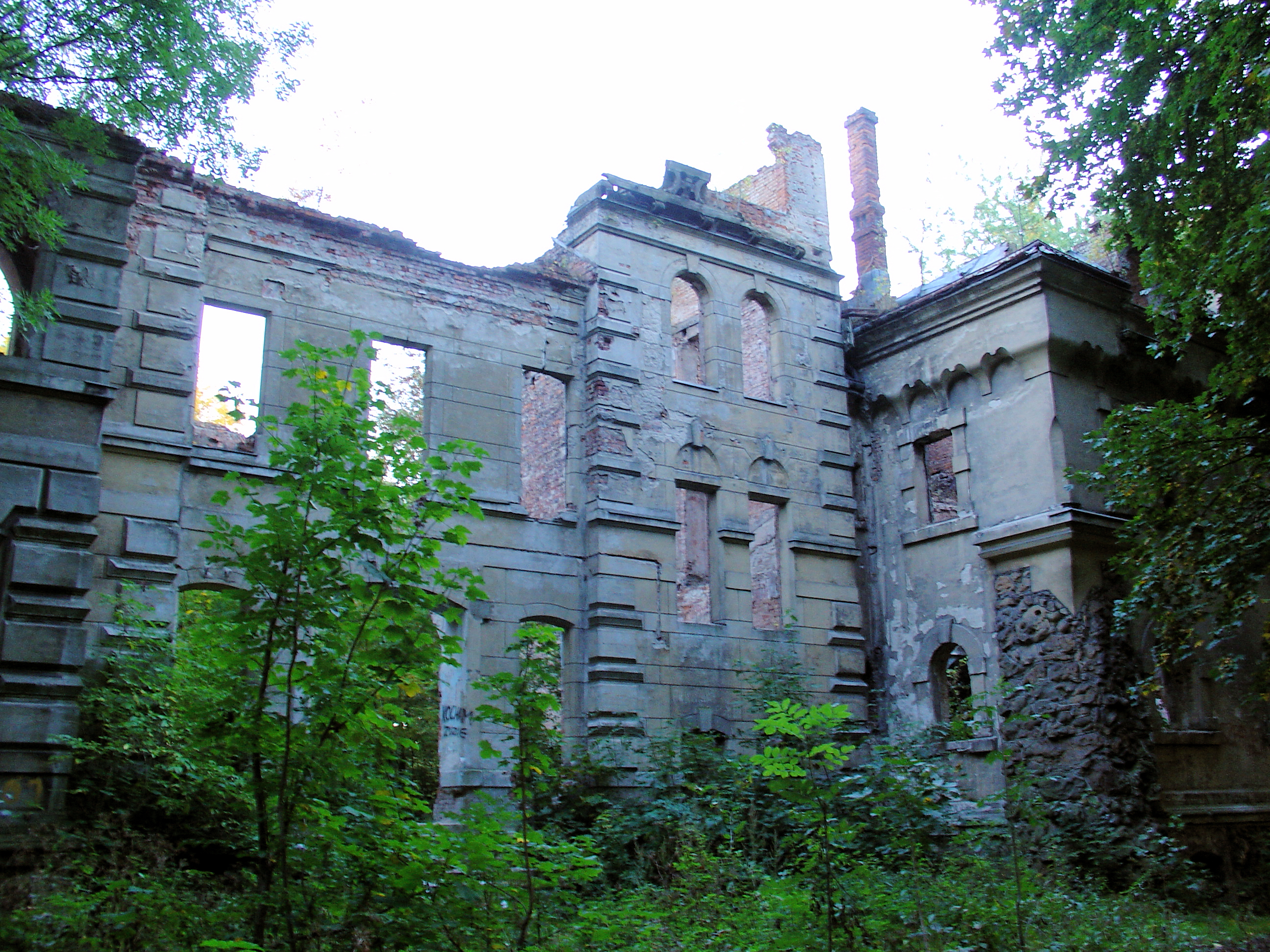
- Palace in Wierbka

- Location within Poland
- Coordinates: 50°28′N 19°43′E
- Country: Poland
- Voivodeship: Silesian
- County: Zawiercie
- Gmina: Pilica

Wierbka [ˈvjɛrpka] is a village in the administrative district of Gmina Pilica, within Zawiercie County, Silesian Voivodeship, in southern Poland.
