= Richard Kwietniowski =

English film director (born 1957)

- Born: 17 March 1957 (age 69); London, England
- Occupations: Film director, screenwriter
- Years active: 1987-present

Richard Kwietniowski (born 17 March 1957) is an English film director and screenwriter of Polish descent. During the 1980s he was a film lecturer at Bulmershe College of Higher Education (now Bulmershe Court in Reading, Berkshire. He has directed eleven films since 1987. His film Love and Death on Long Island was screened in the Un Certain Regard section at the 1997 Cannes Film Festival.

== Filmography ==
- Alfalfa (1987)
- Ballad of Reading Gaol (1988)
- Flames of Passion (1989)
- Proust's Favorite Fantasy (1991)
- Cost of Love (1991)
- Actions Speak Louder Than Words (1992)
- Love and Death on Long Island (1997)
- A Night with Derek (1997)
- Owning Mahowny (2003)
- Regret Not Speaking (2003)
- No One Gets Off in This Town (2010)
