= Patauga jungle boot =

Canvas-and-rubber boot used by the French Army

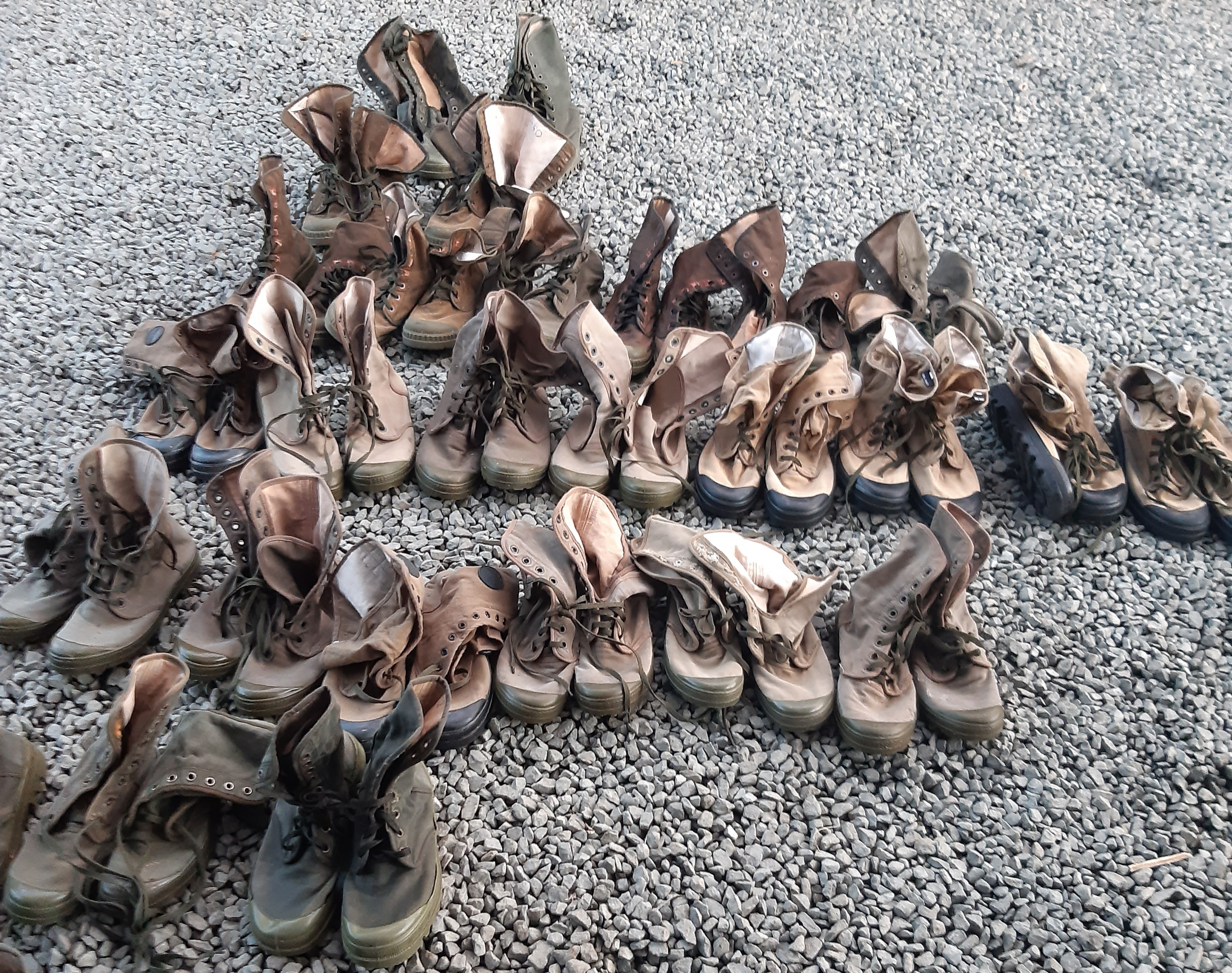
- Multiple different pairs of low-top and high-top French Army Patauga Jungle Boots, 2025
- Type: Canvas and rubber jungle boot
- Place of origin: France

Service history
- Used by: See Users
- Wars: First Indochina War; Korean War; Vietnam War; Laotian Civil War; Cambodian Civil War; Cambodian–Vietnamese War; Sino-Vietnamese War; Algerian War; Cameroon War; Suez Crisis; Portuguese Colonial War; Angolan Civil War; Mozambican Civil War; Rhodesian Bush War; South African Border War; Chadian Civil War (1965–1979); Chadian–Libyan War; Toyota War; Tuareg rebellion (1990–1995); Sand War; Ifni War; Western Sahara War; Western Sahara conflict Mauritania–Senegal Border War; Nigerian Civil War; Somali Civil War; Djiboutian Civil War; 1967 Six-Day War; 1967-1970 War of Attrition; Palestinian insurgency in South Lebanon; Black September; 1973 Yom Kippur War; Lebanese Civil War; 1978 South Lebanon conflict Iran–Iraq War; 1982 Lebanon War; South Lebanon conflict (1985–2000); Republic of the Congo Civil War (1993–1994); Republic of the Congo Civil War (1997–1999); First Ivorian Civil War; Second Ivorian Civil War; Mali War; Islamist insurgency in the Sahel; Central African Bush War; Central African Republic Civil War

Production history
- Designer: French Army Quartermaster Corps; Palladium Boots; René Elissabide
- Designed: 1947
- Manufacturer: French Army Quartermaster Corps; Palladium Boots; SAS Pataugas; Marck & Balsan; Wissart; Aigle; Au Coq; Bonusage; Morvan; Paraflac; Paul Boyé; Vernon; Bata Shoes (Canada); Mafipro (Portugal); Teva Naot (Israel); Sturm MIL-TEC (Germany); Farm Blue (United States)
- Produced: 1947–present
- Variants: See Variants

The Patauga jungle boot or French Army bush boot (French: chaussure de brousse or chaussure de brousse de l'armée française), commonly known as the "splasher" (Patauga), is a lightweight cotton canvas and rubber boot worn by the members of the French Armed Forces when deployed overseas. First introduced in the late 1940s, the Patauga boot, along with the French M1949 Bush Hat, became an icon associated with France's decolonization wars in Indochina and Algeria throughout the 1950s and 1960s. The Pataugas boots were popular not only among members of the French military, but also among civilians engaging in outdoor activities. Its design was subsequently copied and adopted by several militaries worldwide.

== History ==
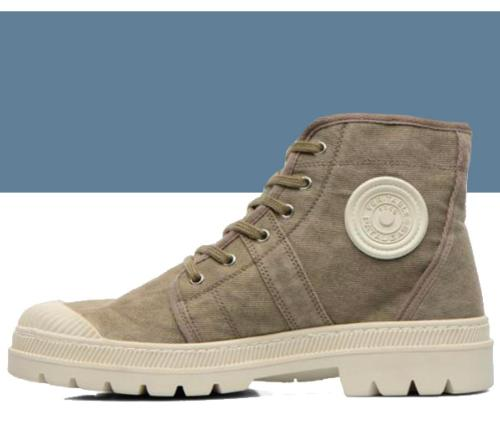
Modern civilian iteration of the Palladium "Pampa" boot, 2018.

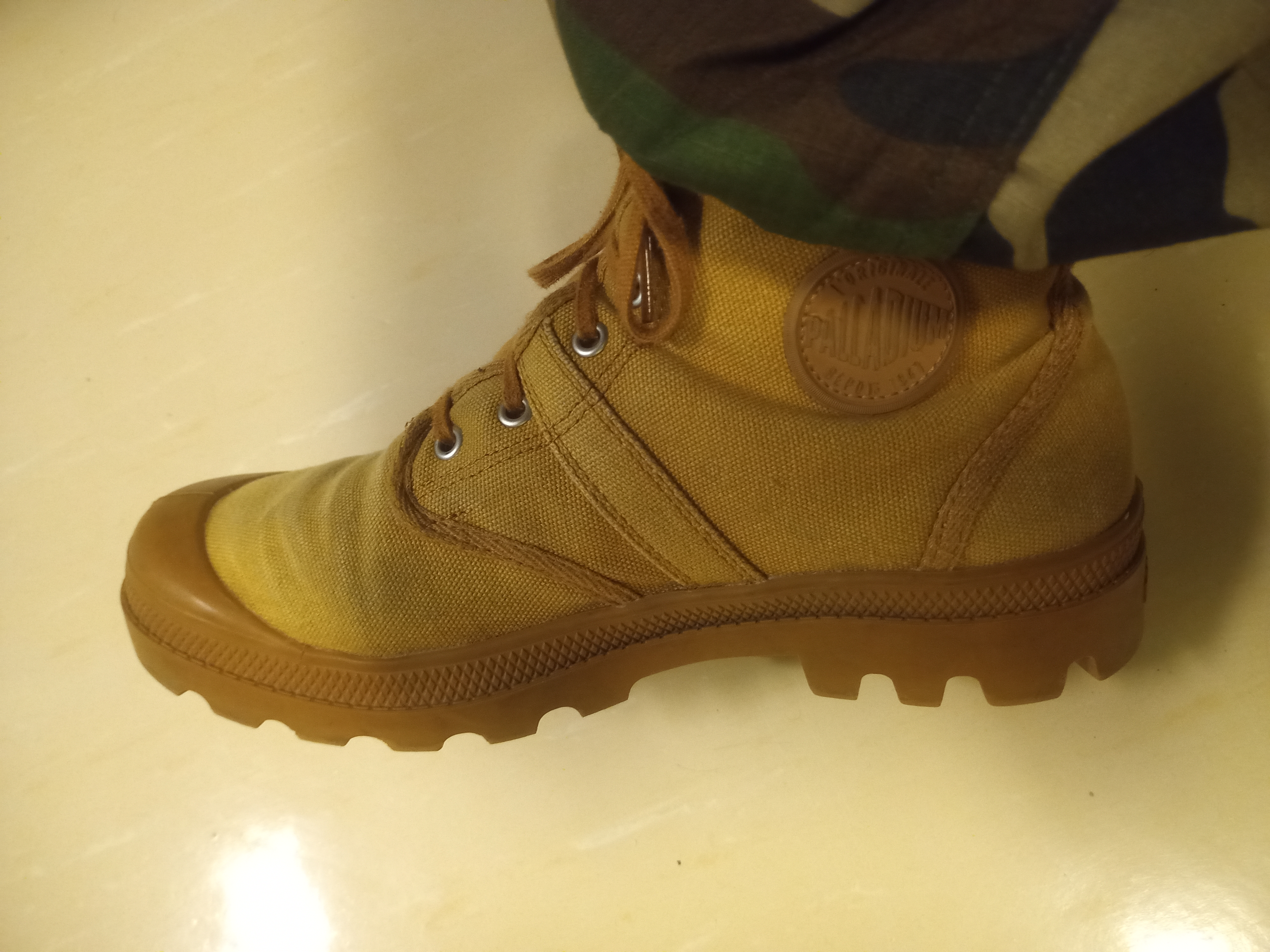
Palladium "Pallabrousse" boot, 2024.

In the aftermath of World War II, the French began to reassert their lost influence over their colonies in French Indochina, comprising Vietnam, Cambodia and Laos, which had been occupied by the Imperial Japanese Army late in the War and were now vying for independence. The troops of the French Far East Expeditionary Corps (CEFEO) that was sent by the French Army to participate in the reoccupation of the Indochinese territories in September 1945 wore on the field a mixture of French regulation and American surplus footwear, including French M1917, M1941, M1945 brown (or black) leather hobnailed ankle boots (French: Brodequins modéle 1917, modéle 1941, modéle 1945), brown leather US 1941 Type II Service Shoes, 1943 Type III Service Shoes, 1943 Service Shoes Reverse Uppers, dual-buckled M1943 Combat Service Boots, and calf-length US M1942 "Corcoran" paratrooper boots, but they had no specifically-designed footwear for tropical climates.

== Variants ==
=== The Portuguese Army model ===
The Portuguese Army and the Portuguese Marine Corps adopted in the early 1960s the Canvas boot model 1964 (Portuguese: Bota de lona m/964), whose design appears to have been based on the French Army Mle 1954 Patauga boot used during the Algerian War. As per in the French model, the Portuguese Model 1964 boot is characterised by his double colour construction, with the upper and the heel counter being made of olive green canvas and the toe in black canvas. The low-top upper has 5 lace eyelets made of stainless steel and is reinforced by metal rivets at the base of the lacing system. The tongue is not sewn to the top of the boot by side stitches and although this provides better ventilation, it also allows the infiltration of humidity and small pebbles into the boot. In contrast to the French original, the Portuguese version features built-in double round eyelets at the inner shank of the boot, intended for both fast drainage and ventilation, allowing the circulation of air on the inside.

=== The Italian Army model ===
Introduced in the late 1950s, the Italian Army's version of the Patauga boot consisted of high-top khaki or olive canvas uppers provided with 4 metal lace eyelets and 5 speed-lace eyelets, a toe cap and black rubber outsole, and was produced in two variants: one basic model lacking built-in ventilation eyelets (Italian: Stivaletti) and a second model, designated "landing boots" (Italian: Stivaletti da sbarco, Scalfarotti), in which the outsoles were provided with 5 fast drainage eyelets – 3 on the inner shank and 2 on the outside –, and a slip-resistant "ripple" pattern tread. Also known as the "Amphibians, Lagoon, Italian Army" (Italian: Anfibi Lagunari Esercito Italiano), the landing boots were issued to the soldiers of the Lagunari Regiment "Serenissima", an Italian Army amphibious infantry unit formed in 1957 at Venice, who wore them while operating in the marshy ground environment typical of the coastal lagoons in the northern Adriatic Sea – the Venetian Lagoon, the Marano Lagoon, and the Grado Lagoon. The Landing boots were also provided to the Italian Navy's 1st San Marco Naval Infantry Regiment.

=== The Indigenous Combat Boot ===
Developed by the U.S. Army Natick Laboratories in Natick, Massachusetts in the early 1960s, the Indigenous Combat Boot was an American-designed jungle boot derived from the French Patauga boot for use in Vietnam. It consisted of high-top black canvas uppers provided with 8 metal lace eyelets, a toe cap and outsole made of rubber in the same colour that contained an anti-Punji stick metal plate on the inside. Other features that distinguished the Indigenous Combat Boot from the original French model were the two screened drainage eyelets on the inner shank and the plain round rubberized ankle reinforcements lacking the manufacturer's markings. Like the Vibram-soled U.S. Army Jungle boots, the tread gave poor traction and tended to get clogged with mud. In addition, since they were produced in Japan using Japanese foot lasts, most South Vietnamese soldiers often found the indigenous boots to be ill-suited to the local conditions and uncomfortable to wear.

=== The Bata boot ===
In response to the complaints regarding the indigenous combat boot, the Canadian-based Bata Shoes Company began developing in 1968 a new, improved jungle boot that used anthropometric Vietnamese foot lasts produced by Natick Laboratories, bringing it closer to the French Patauga design favoured by the South Vietnamese. Like its predecessor, the new jungle boot consisted of cotton canvas uppers, sometimes reinforced by metal rivets at the base of the lacing system, and a toe cap and outsole made of black rubber with a horizontal triple-ribbed midsole; it also retained the screened drainage eyelets on the inner shank and the (Bata-marked) round rubberized ankle reinforcements, though the latter was often absent in the high-top version. Made under contract in Canada, the improved Bata Jungle Boots were produced in three sizes (6-eyelets, 7-eyelets, and 11-eyelets), being also available in khaki and olive green versions.

=== Chinese and North Vietnamese variants ===
First adopted in 1950 by the General Logistics Department of the Chinese People's Liberation Army (PLA), the Type 50 combat sneaker, best known as the "liberation shoe", is a Chinese-designed canvas-and-rubber low-rise plimsoll-type shoe that was used by both the PLA during the Korean War and the Vietnamese communist Viet Minh regular guerrilla forces fighting in the northern Tonkin region of French Indochina during the First Indochina War, which were trained, armed and supplied since 1949 by the People's Republic of China. It consists of reed green canvas uppers provided with four aluminium eyelets and a tan or black rubber vertically-ribbed outsole and toe cap; the thick outsole has a simple "ripple" or zigzag pattern tread and lacks a raised heel cap. Simple and cheap to produce, the "liberation shoes" were provided in large quantities to the Viet Minh and its successor, the People's Army of Vietnam (PAVN) of the Democratic Republic of Vietnam (DRV) throughout the 1950s, 1960s and the early 1970s, eventually becoming their standard footwear throughout the Indochina and Vietnam Wars.

These plimsoll shoes were not hardwearing, however, and tended to disintegrate through operational use, especially during the long journey from North Vietnam down the Ho Chi Minh trail into South Vietnam. As they marched through the rugged hot and wet jungle terrain of Laos, North Vietnamese soldiers quickly realized that their Chinese-made shoes were not designed for a tropical environment, since they retained humidity and perspiration due to a lack of proper ventilation, took a long time to dry, and if not removed regularly, they were prone to causing malodorous fungal and bacterial infections such as Trench foot and Athlete's foot that ruined the wearer's feet. Moreover, the shoes offered limited ankle support, though most North Vietnamese had grown up barefoot or wearing sandals, so this presented few problems. Eventually, the "liberation shoes" lasted no more than two months in the field, so replacements were constantly sought. One quick solution for PAVN soldiers was to remove the Bata boots, Indigenous Combat Boots and US-style jungle boots from any dead South Vietnamese CIDG militiamen or ARVN regular soldier they encountered and use these to replace their worn-out footwear, although the preferred option taken by most North Vietnamese infantrymen was to exchange at first opportunity their rotten and smelly Chinese shoes for the famous, locally produced Ho Chi Minh sandals (Vietnamese: dép lốp or "tire sandal") made of black rubber soles cut from discarded truck tires and held on by inner-tube straps.

Despite their shortcomings, the Type 50 "liberation shoes" remained standard issue with Chinese PLA troops and People's Armed Police (PAP) personnel until 2015, when they began to be replaced by a new, better-designed model of anti-bacterial, anti-fungal and odour resistant black combat trainers.

Although almost completely dependent on Chinese logistical support, with PAVN combat footwear being all imported from PLA sources, the North Vietnamese did developed their own model of jungle combat boot after 1954, based upon captured French Patauga jungle boots. Known as the PAVN jungle boot, its design appears to have been directly inspired by the Palladium "Pampa" and "Pallabrousse" models, consisting of khaki, reed green or (rarely) black cotton canvas uppers provided with a pull loop at the backstay and a black or slightly brownish rubber vertically-ribbed outsole, a (slightly) raised heel cap and toe cap. The PAVN jungle boot is manufactured locally in two high-cut versions, one with just six metal eyelets and another with nine metal eyelets, whilst the upper incorporates a single diagonal reinforcement stripe along the side, as per in the Palladium models. Early production batches of the PAVN jungle boot had khaki uppers and Vibram-type rubber soles, though khaki canvas had ceased to be used for the uppers several years before the end of the Vietnam War and a distinctive rubber sole tread pattern incorporating notches, V- and crescent-shaped lugs and small raised "commas" under the studs became standard. Unlike the Chinese plimsolls, the PAVN jungle boots were better adapted to the tropical climate and dried quickly when wet. The Chinese soon produced their own version of the PAVN jungle boot, the Type 65 combat boot, which featured high-rise reed green canvas uppers – with or without the reinforcement strap at the side and lacking the pull loop at the backstay – provided with six aluminium eyelets and a black or olive-brown rubber outsole (either vertically-ribbed or smooth) and toe cap; sometimes a rubber heel counter was added at the back. Eventually, the Type 65 jungle boot was adopted as standard combat footwear by the Chinese PLA, being also provided as military aid to North Vietnam.

The PAVN jungle boot has proved so popular that eventually Vietnam started exporting its canvas-and-rubber boot to East European armies in the early 1990s.

== Combat use ==
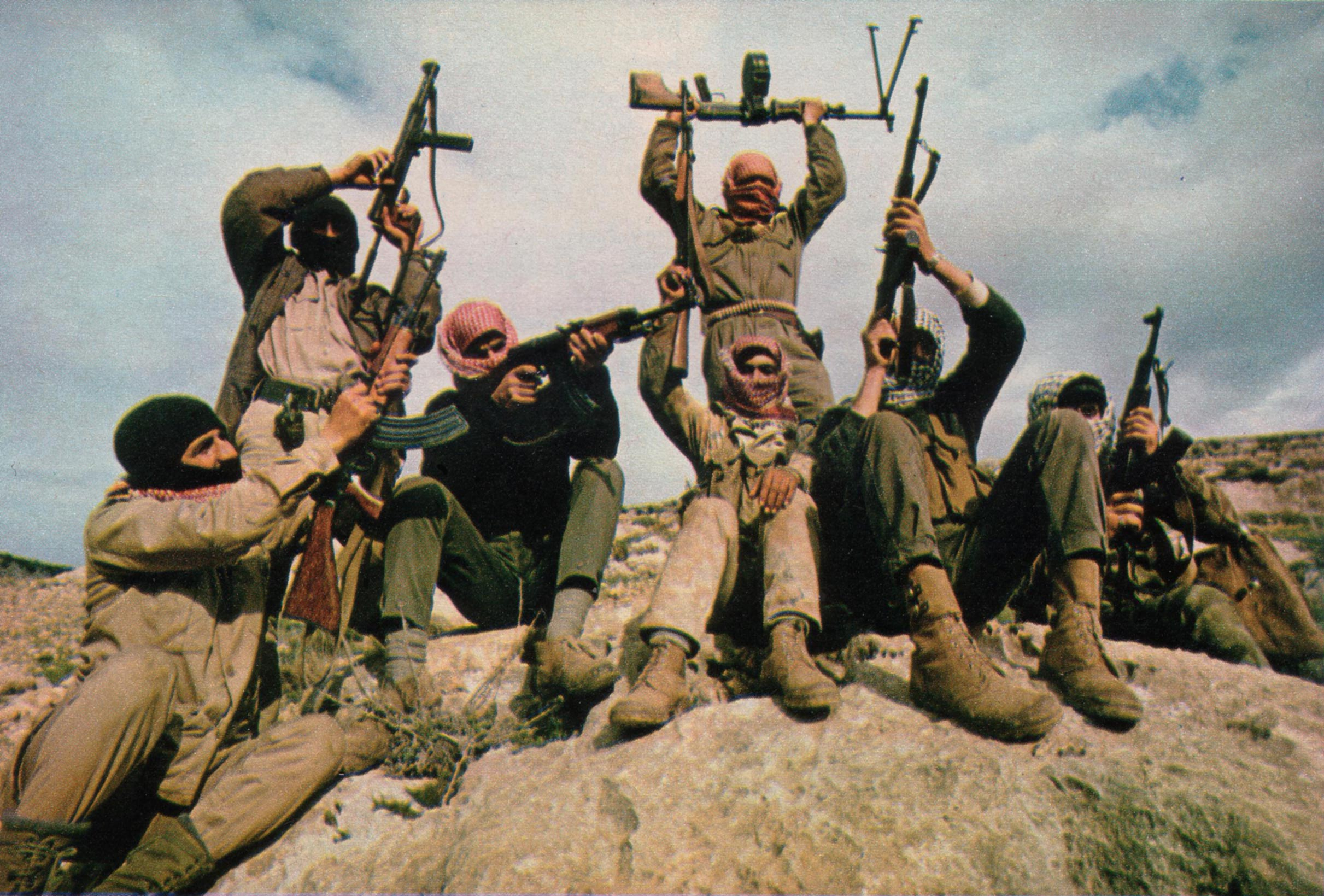
A patrol of Popular Front for the Liberation of Palestine (PFLP) guerrillas in Jordan, early 1969, wearing khaki or olive green Pataugas boots of the low-top, high-top and double-buckle ankle cuff variants.

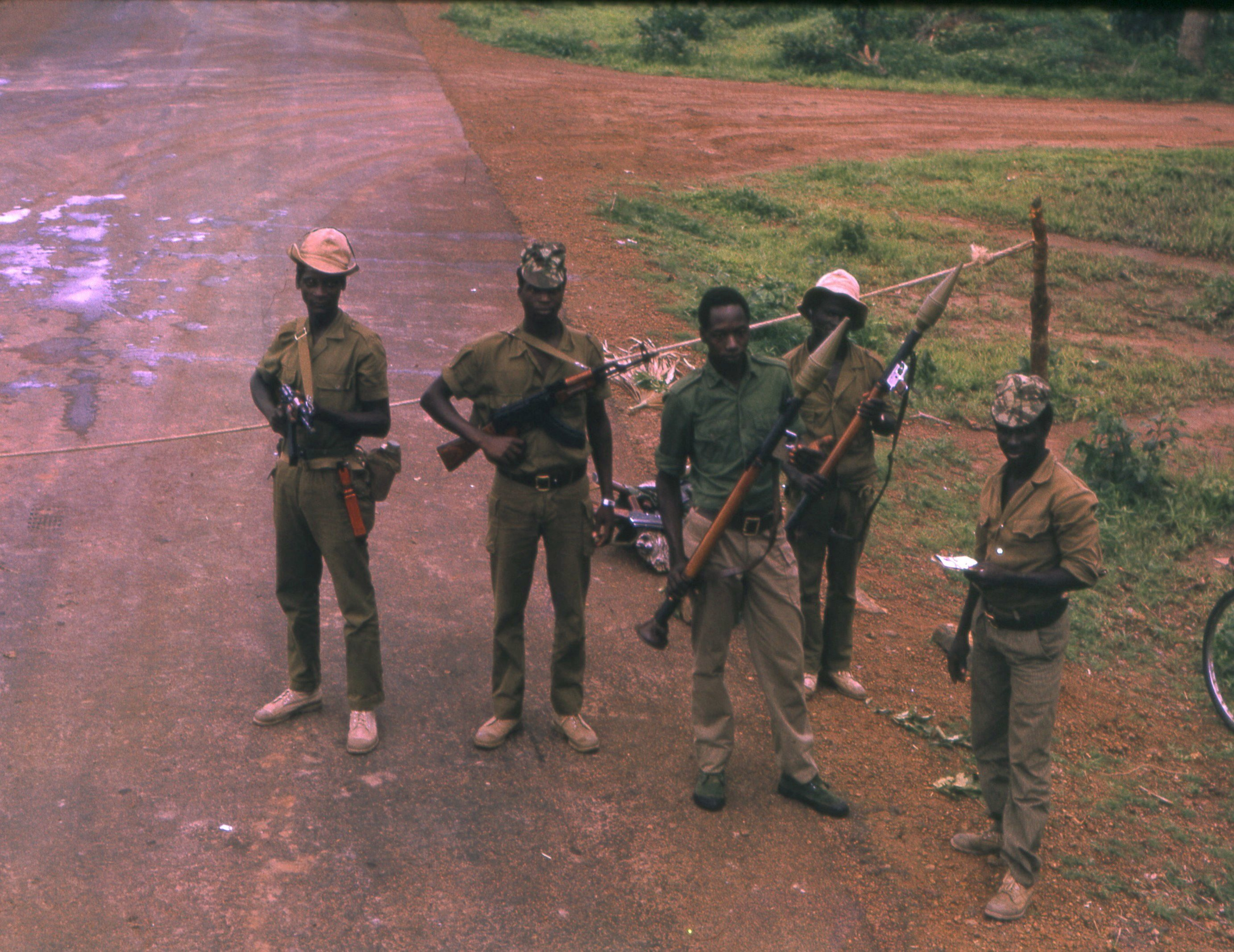
A squad of five PAIGC/FARP guerrillas, with three of them wearing khaki Pataugas boots and one at the centre wears Chinese reed green Type 65 jungle boots, manning a checkpoint in Guinea-Bissau, 1974.

== Users ==
- Algeria: used by the National Liberation Army (1954–1962).
- Angola
- Benin
- Biafra: used by the Biafran Armed Forces (1968–1970).
- Burkina Faso
- Cambodia: used by the Royal Khmer Armed Forces (1950–1970) and the Khmer National Armed Forces (1970–1975).
- Cameroon: used by the Cameroon Armed Forces.
- Central African Republic
- Chad: used by the Chadian Armed Forces (FAT), Chadian National Armed Forces (FANT) and Chadian National Army (ANT).
- China: used by the People's Liberation Army.
- Comoros
- Djibouti
- Egypt
- France: used by the French Armed Forces (1947–2000).
- Gabon
- Guinea
- Guinea-Bissau: used by the Revolutionary Armed Forces of the People (FARP).
- Kingdom of Laos: used by the Royal Lao Armed Forces and Special Guerrilla Units (1950–1975).
- Lebanon: used by several Christian Lebanese Front and Muslim Lebanese National Movement militias during the Lebanese Civil War (1975–1993).
- Iraq: used by the Iraqi Army during the Iran–Iraq War (1980–88).
- Israel: used by the Israel Defense Forces and Israel security forces.
- Italy: used by the Italian Army's Lagunari Regiment "Serenissima" and the Italian Navy's 1st San Marco Regiment.
- Ivory Coast
- Sahrawi Arab Democratic Republic: used by the Sahrawi People's Liberation Army.
- Syria: used by the Syrian Arab Armed Forces.
- Senegal
- Somalia
- South Africa: used by the South African Defence Force, South African Police, South West Africa Territorial Force and the South West African Police.
- South Vietnam: used by the Vietnamese National Army (1950–1955) and the Army of the Republic of Vietnam (1960–1975).
- Tunisia
- Togo
- Vietnam: used by the Viet Minh and the People's Army of Vietnam (PAVN).
- Palestine: used by the Palestine Liberation Organization (PLO) guerrilla groups and Palestine Liberation Army units in Jordan, Syria and Lebanon.
- Portugal
- Madagascar
- Mali
- Mauritania
- Morocco
- Mozambique
- Niger
- Republic of the Congo
- Rhodesia: used by the Rhodesian Security Forces.

== See also ==
- Combat boot
- Jungle boot
- Safari boot
- Palladium Boots (French footwear manufacturer)
- SAS Pataugas (French footwear manufacturer)
- Teva Naot (Israeli footwear manufacturer)
- Bata Shoes (Czech/Canadian footwear manufacturer)
