= Italian Marines =

The Italian Armed Forces maintain three types of units who could be called the Italian Marines:

- Decima Flottiglia MAS, with commando frogman unit of the Regia Marina (Italian Royal Navy)
- San Marco Marine Brigade, marines of the Italian Navy (Marina Militare) based in Brindisi.
- Lagunari, amphibious troops of the Italian Army (Esercito Italiano), of the Serenissima Regiment based in Venice.
