= Misrata ambush =

2016 battle in Libya

Misrata ambush (2016)
- Part of the Battle of Sirte (2016) and the Libyan civil war (2014–2020)
Date	27 April 2016
Location	Misrata-Sirte road, Libya
Result	IS victory

Belligerents
Government of National Accord (GNA); Supported by: United Kingdom; Italy	Islamic State: Wilayat Tripolitania

Units involved
(Libya) Local GNA soldiers Royal Marines: Elements of the Special Boat Service; Italian Marines: Elements of the San Marco Marine Brigade	Military of the Islamic State

Casualties and losses
Several captured or killed	Several suicide bombers
- Several Italian Marines killed in action or wounded. No British casualties.

On 27 April 2016, Islamic State in Libya ambushed a convoy consisting of an undisclosed number of Libyan GNA as well as foreign troops. A multi-national force of Britain's Special Boat Service personnel, Italian Marines from the San Marco Marine Brigade, and local soldiers loyal to the recognized Libyan Government of National Accord were travelling from the northwestern Libyan city of Misrata towards the city of Sirte when it was hit. The ambush continued until "Italian and French warplanes and attack helicopters intrevend" according to several intelligence websites.

Unconfirmed reports indicated that the convoy suffered casualties including several GNA soldiers captured or killed, and several Italian marines killed or wounded.
