= Amphibious Battalion "Sile" =

Inactive Italian Army amphibious unit

- Battaglione Anfibio "Sile"
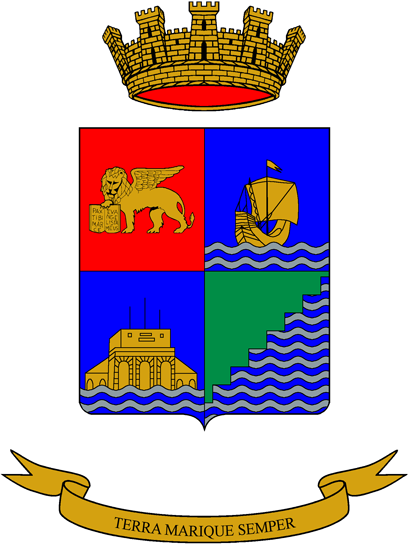
- Battalion coat of arms
- Active: 20 Oct. 1975 — 13 Oct. 1992
- Country: Italy
- Branch: Italian Army
- Part of: Amphibious Troops Command
- Garrison/HQ: Venice
- Motto: "Terra Marique Semper"
- Anniversaries: 25 June 1984

Insignia
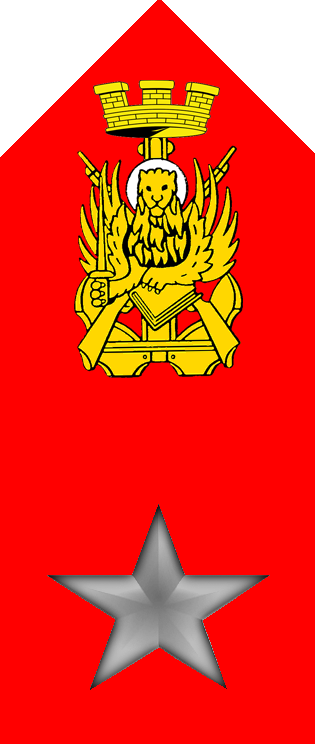
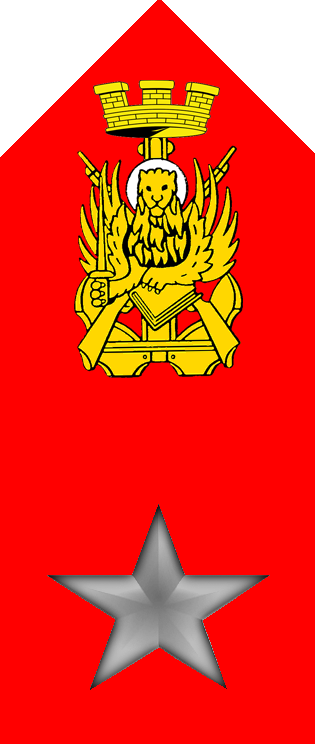
- Lagunari gorget patches

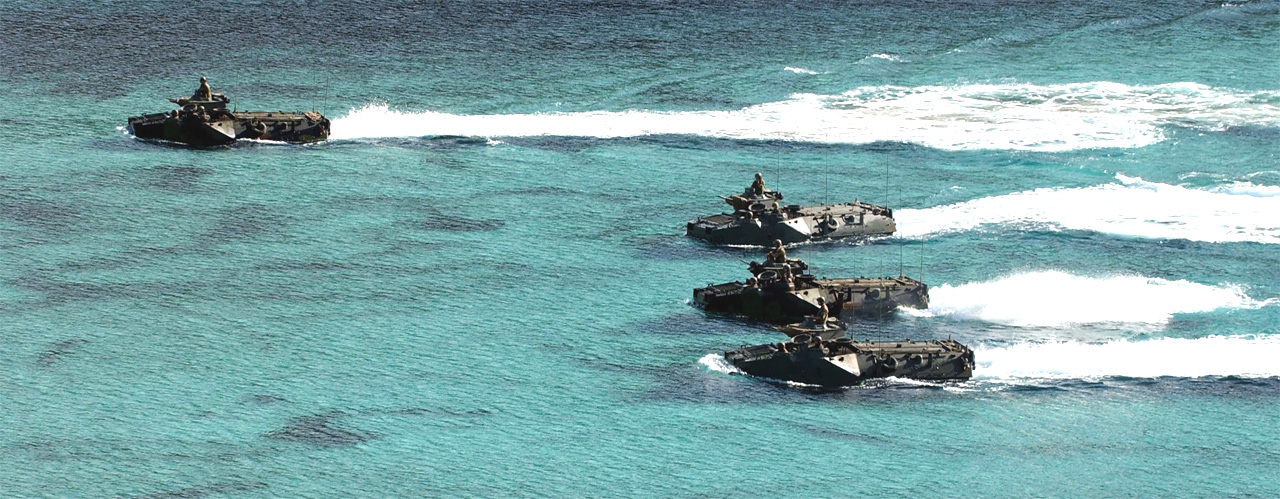
Lagunari during an exercise in Capo Teulada in Sardinia

The Amphibious Battalion "Sile" (Italian: Battaglione Anfibio "Sile") is an inactive unit of Italian Army's infantry arm's amphibious Lagunari speciality. The name of the specialty comes from the Italian word for lagoon (Italian: laguna), while the battalion's name "Sile" commemorates the Cacciatori del Sile - a unit of Venetian volunteers, who fought against the Austro-Hungarian Army during the Siege of Venice in 1848 - and also commemorates the battles fought by the Royal Italian Army against Austro-Hungarian Army troops along the Sile river in 1917 during the First Battle of the Piave River and in 1918 during the Second Battle of the Piave River and the Battle of Vittorio Veneto. The battalion was based on Sant'Andrea island in the Venetian Lagoon and in Cà Vio on the Cavallino peninsula, which separates the Venetian Lagoon from the Adriatic Sea and is bound on its North by the Sile river. During its existence the battalion was assigned to the Amphibious Troops Command. Today the battalion's traditions are carried on by the Amphibious Tactical Support Company of the Lagunari Regiment "Serenissima". The battalion's anniversary falls, as for all Lagunari units, on 25 June 1984, the day the Lagunari were elevated to a speciality of the Italian Army's infantry arm.

== History ==
=== Republic of San Marco ===
In 1848, revolutions erupted in the Italian states, which led to the First Italian War of Independence. On 17 March 1848, the people of Venice rose up against Habsburg rule and freed Daniele Manin and other revolutionaries from Habsburg imprisonment. On 22 March 1848, the citizens of Venice stormed the Arsenal and distributed its weapons to the citizens of the city. On the same day, Manin proclaimed Venice's independence and the Republic of San Marco. On 26 March 1848, Austrian forces fled from Venice. The news of the successful insurrection in Venice spread to the other cities of the former Republic of Venice, which formed volunteer units to fight the Austrian occupation forces. One such unit were the Cacciatori del Sile, a light infantry unit formed by the cities of Treviso and Padua and named for the Sile river, which straddles the Venetian Lagoon. On 21 October 1848, the unit moved through the Venetian Lagoon to attack Austrian forces on the Cavallino peninsula. After routing the Austrians the unit returned to its base in Venice-Lido, where General Guglielmo Pepe honored the unit with a visit on 23 October. On 4 May 1849, Austrian forces, which in the meantime had defeated the Kingdom of Sardinia in the First Italian War of Independence, began the Siege of Venice with an attack against the fort of Marghera. On 26 May 1849, the fort at Marghera had to be evacuated and Venice's defenders fell back to the city itself, which was heavily bombarded by the Austrian Army and Navy. On 22 August 1849, Venice surrendered and five days later, on 27 August, Austrian forces entered the city and the Cacciatori del Sile were disbanded.

=== Kingdom of Italy ===
In 1866, after the Third Italian War of Independence, the Austro-Hungarian Empire ceded the parts of the Kingdom of Lombardy–Venetia, which it still controlled, to the Second French Empire, which in turn ceded it to the Kingdom of Italy. On 1 January 1877, the Royal Italian Army's 2nd Engineer Regiment formed the 14th Sappers Company (Lagunari), which was based in Venice and tasked with operating in the Venetian Lagoon, Marano Lagoon, and Grado Lagoon. On 1 January 1883, the company was transferred to the newly formed 4th Engineer Regiment. On 1 November 1887, the 4th Engineer Regiment formed a second Lagunari company and the two companies were renumbered as 9th Lagunari Company respectively 10th Lagunari Company.

=== World War I ===
In May 1915, just before Italy's entry into World War I, the 4th Engineer Regiment (Pontieri) formed the 15th Lagunari Company. On 1 December 1915, the 4th Engineer Regiment (Pontieri) formed the 20th, 21st, 22nd, 23rd, and 24th Lagunari companies. From 1915 to 1918, the Lagunari were tasked with maintaining a 1,700 kilometer long navigable network lagoons and rivers of the Mantua-Ferrara-Marano Lagoon triangle. After the Battle of Caporetto and the Italian retreat to the Piave river the Lagunari companies operated on the extreme right flank of the Italian front in the Piave estuary and along the Sile river. In June and July 1918, the Lagunari companies fought during the Second Battle of the Piave River on the lower Piave and along the Sile river. In October 1918, the Lagunari fought in the Battle of Vittorio Veneto in the same area.

On 28 August 1918, the Royal Italian Army formed the 8th Engineer Regiment (Lagunari) in Ferrara, which received the eight existing Laguanri companies. The regiment consisted of a command, the I Lagunari Battalion in Venice with the 9th, 15th, 20th, and 23rd Lagunari companies, and the II Lagunari Battalion with the 10th, 21st, 22nd, and 24th Lagunari companies in Ferrara. In October 1918, the regiment formed the 1st Train Company and the same month the regiment's companies were heavily engaged in the Piave delta during the Battle of Vittorio Veneto. In November 1918, the regiment moved from Ferrara to Venice, where it was disbanded on 21 November 1919. The regiment's last remaining battalion, which consisted of two Lagunari companies, was returned on the same day to the 4th Engineer Regiment (Pontieri), which was renamed on the same day Pontieri and Lagunari Engineer Regiment.

=== Cold War ===
In 1964, the Lagunari Regiment "Serenissima" formed an Amphibious Transports Company, which consisted of an amphibious vehicles platoon based in Cà Vio and a watercraft platoon based on the island of Sant'Andrea.

During the 1975 army reform the Italian Army disbanded the regimental level and newly independent battalions were granted for the first time their own flags. On 20 October 1975, the Lagunari Regiment "Serenissima" was disbanded and the next day the regiment's Amphibious Transports Company was reorganized and renamed Amphibious Vehicles Battalion "Sile". The battalion was assigned to the Amphibious Troops Command and consisted of a command, a command and services company, which was based on the island of Sant'Andrea and included a reconnaissance platoon, and an amphibious transports company, which was based in Cà Vio and on Sant'Andrea island. At the time the battalion fielded 240 men (14 officers, 61 non-commissioned officers, and 165 soldiers). On 12 November 1976, the President of the Italian Republic Giovanni Leone granted with decree 846 the battalion a flag.

In 1981, the Amphibious Transports Company was split into a Nautical Vehicles Company based on Sant'Andrea island, and an Amphibious Company based in Cà Vio. The latter company was equipped with 15 LVTP-7 tracked amphibious landing vehicles, one LVTP-7C tracked amphibious command post vehicle, and one LVTP-7R tracked amphibious recovery vehicle. The same year the battalion changed its name to Amphibious Battalion "Sile". On 25 June 1984, the Lagunari became a speciality within the Italian Army's infantry arm and, on 26 August 1984, the Italian Armed Forces' Military Vicar Gaetano Bonicelli assigned Saint Mark the Evangelist as patron saint of the new speciality.

=== Recent times ===
In 1992, the Nautical Vehicles Company merged its Landing Craft Platoon into the Watercraft Platoon. During the same year, the Amphibious Company and the Command and Services Company were disbanded, with the Amphibious Vehicles Platoon and the Reconnaissance Platoon joining the Nautical Vehicles Company. On 13 October 1992, the Amphibious Battalion "Sile" was disbanded and the next day the Nautical Vehicles Company entered the reformed Lagunari Regiment "Serenissima". Today the company continues to exist as Amphibious Tactical Support Company and is still based on Sant'Andrea island. After the battalion was disbanded, the flag of the Amphibious Battalion "Sile" was transferred to the Shrine of the Flags in the Vittoriano in Rome for safekeeping.

== Organization ==
The Amphibious Vehicles Battalion "Sile" had a unique organization among Italian Army units, as its purpose was to provide naval transport and reconnaissance capabilities to the 1st Lagunari Battalion "Serenissima". From 1981 to 1992, the battalion had the following organization:

- Amphibious Vehicles Battalion "Sile", on Sant'Andrea island
  - Command and Services Company, on Sant'Andrea island
    - Command and Services Platoon
    - Reconnaissance Platoon
    - Repairs and Supplies Platoon
  - Amphibious Vehicles Company, in Cà Vio
    - Command Squad
    - Amphibious Vehicles Platoon
  - Nautical Vehicles Company, on Sant'Andrea island
    - Command Squad
    - Landing Craft Platoon
    - Watercraft Platoon

The Amphibious Vehicles Company was equipped with 15 LVTP-7 tracked amphibious landing vehicles, one LVTP-7C tracked amphibious command post vehicle, and one LVTP-7R tracked amphibious recovery vehicle. In 1980s the LVTP-7 vehicles were upgraded to Assault Amphibious Vehicles. The Nautical Vehicles Company was equipped with personnel landing crafts, medium landing craft, small patrol boats, naval ambulances, and rigid-hull inflatable boats.

== See also ==
- Lagunari Regiment "Serenissima"
