= MTP96-class landing craft =

Class overview
- Name: MTP96 class
- Builders: Studioplast, Casale sul Sile (Venezia) and various shipyards
- Operators: Italian Navy; Italian Army
- In service: 1996

General characteristics
- Type: Landing Craft Vehicle Personnel
- Displacement: - 14 t (14 long tons) full load; - 8.5 t (8.4 long tons) light
- Length: 13.1 m (43 ft 0 in) LOA
- Beam: 3.8 m (12 ft 6 in) over all
- Draft: 3.8 m (12 ft 6 in)
- Depth: 0.7 m (2 ft 4 in)
- Propulsion: - Waterjet; - 2 x Castoldi Jet Turbodrive 282; - 2 x diesel engines, 515 kW (691 bhp)
- Speed: 22 knots (41 km/h) loaded; 27 knots (50 km/h) light
- Range: 100 nmi (190 km; 120 mi) at 12 knots (22 km/h; 14 mph)
- Complement: 3

The MTP96 class is a series of Landing Craft Vehicle Personnel used by the Italian Navy and Italian Army.

== History ==
Twenty of these crafts are operated aboard the three San Giorgio-class ships and used by the San Marco Marine Brigade at Brindisi Naval Station homeport. A few others are used by 1st Lagunari Regiment "Serenissima" of the Italian Army in the Venice lagoon.

== Landing craft ==
| Name | Pennant number | Hull number | Launched | Commissioned | Notes |
Italian Navy - MTP96 class
| MTP96 | MDN94 | | | | |
| MTP96 | MDN95 | | | | |
| MTP96 | MDN96 | | | | |
| MTP97 | MDN97 | | | | |
| MTP96 | MDN98 | | | | |
| MTP96 | MDN99 | | | | |
| MTP96 | MDN100 | | | | |
| MTP96 | MDN101 | | | | |
| MTP96 | MDN102 | | | | |
| MTP96 | MDN103 | | | | |
| MTP96 | MDN104 | | | | |
| MTP96 | MDN108 | | | | |
| MTP96 | MDN109 | | | | |
| MTP96 | MDN114 | | | | |
| MTP96 | MDN115 | | | | |
| MTP96 | MDN116 | | | | |
| MTP96 | MDN117 | | | | |
| MTP96 | MDN118 | | | | |
| MTP96 | MDN119 | | | | |
| MTP96 | MDN120 | | | | |
Italian Army - MTP96 class
| MTP96 | 287 | | | 2002 | |
| MTP96 | | | | | |
| MTP96 | | | | | |
| MTP96 | | | | | |
