= Pataugas =

French footwear manufacturer

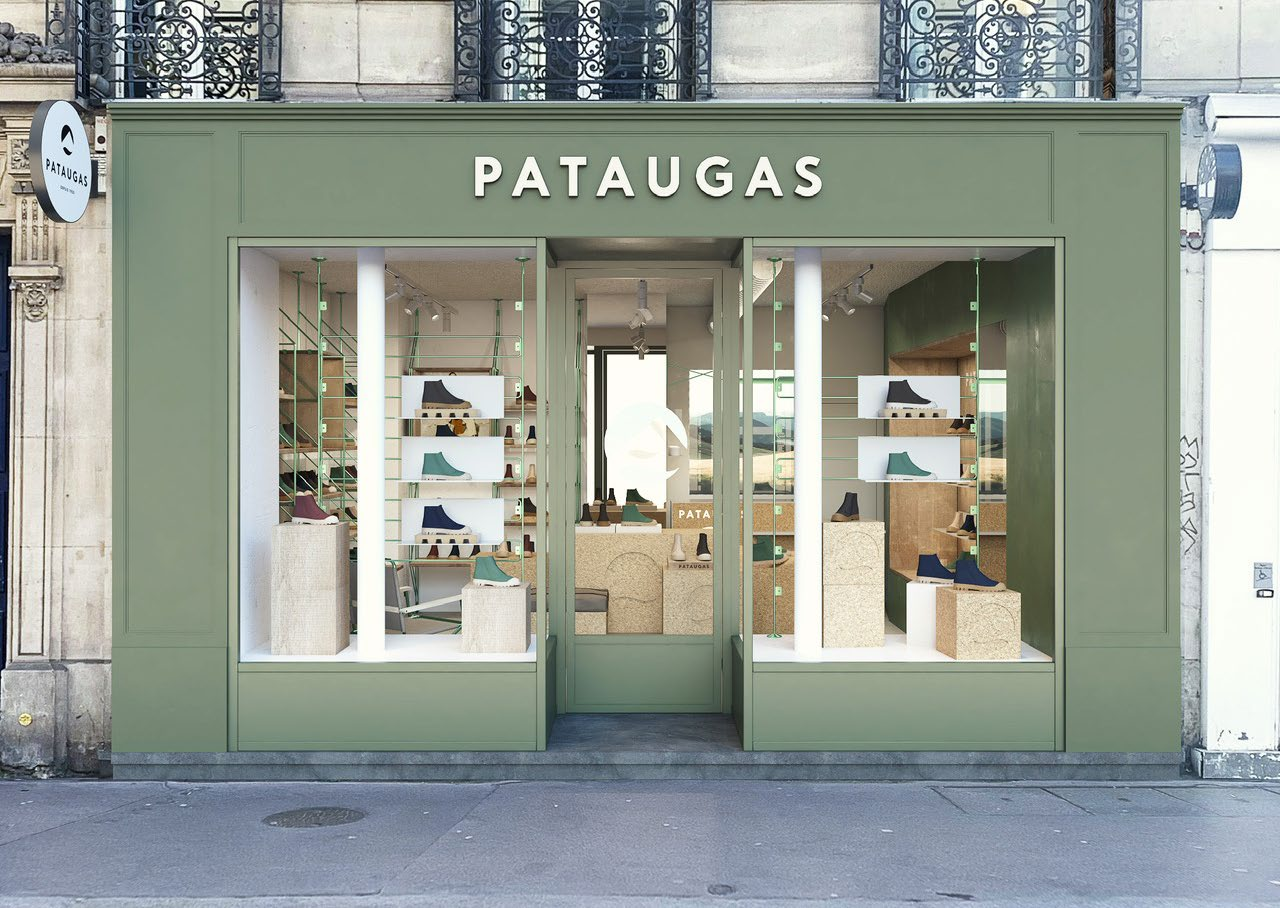
- A Pataugas shop
- Industry: footwear
- Founded: 1950
- Founder: René Elissabid
- Headquarters: Aix-en-Provence, France
- Parent: VGM Holding
- Website: https://www.pataugas.com/

Pataugas is a French shoe brand, headquartered in Aix-en-Provence. The company was founded in 1950 to market the Pataugas work and hiking shoe, and has since expanded to offer a range of hiking and leisure footwear. In 2023 the brand was acquired by VGM Holding, who announced that they would not be retaining the employees or the company's stores.

== Original Pataugas shoe ==
The Pataugas shoe is derived from the brodequin, a traditional short boot worn in the Basque country, with the addition of a crêpe rubber outsole vulcanised using a gas flame. The name pataugas is a phonetic spelling of the French pâte au gaz, meaning '[rubber] paste with gas'.

== History ==
The Pataugas shoe was invented by René Elissabid, an industrialist from the village of Mauleon in the province of Soule, who founded the company in 1950. The boots became popular among Scouts, hikers, and members of the French military. Three hikers named Etcheberry, Etchegoyen and Etchebarne (dubbed "the 3 Etch") wore them on their 1955 walk through France promoting Basque culture and products, which started in Mauléon and ended in Lille.

Manufacturing remained in Mauléon until 1995. The Pataugas brand was distributed by Groupe Royer, a French shoe distributor, and then by the French clothing and footwear group Groupe André, later Vivarte, who acquired it in 1987. The company's footwear was sold primarily in department store boutiques; it also had a small number of its own shops and sold online. Hopps Group, an investment partnership, bought the brand in 2017 and expanded the number of shops, promoting it as a casual chic brand.

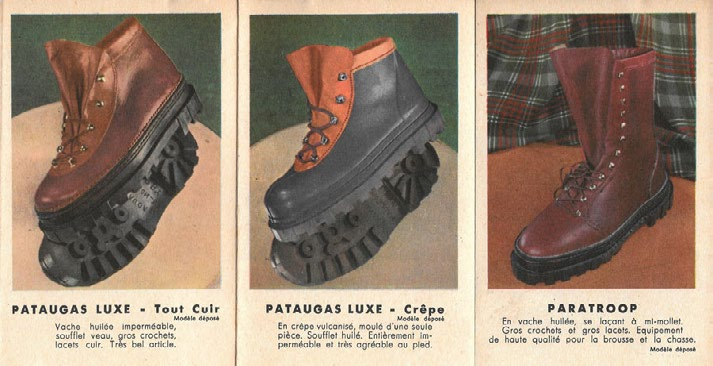
Footwear offered by Pataugas in 1955

In 1953, after a visit to the United States, Elissabid added a model of boots called Texas to the company's offerings. As of February 2018, Pataugas offered 35 men's footwear options, 110 of women's, and about 15 for children, in addition to its first leather bag. In 2021, the brand adopted a new logo, revamped its collections, and returned some production from Portugal to France.

In 2023, VGM Holding, the parent of the footwear distributor Chaussea, purchased the Pataugas brand and design rights. They announced that they would not be retaining the employees or the sales outlets; some of the shops were transferred to a different chain. The remaining two shops are to close in January 2024.

== See also ==
- Palladium Boots – another French footwear brand manufacturing similar lightweight cotton canvas boots.
- Patauga jungle boot – canvas and rubber boot used by the French military.
