= Palladium Boots =

French footwear company

Palladium
- Industry: footwear
- Founded: 1947
- Headquarters: Lyon, France
- Parent: KP Global
- Website: palladiumboots.com

Palladium Boots is a French footwear brand best known for its lightweight cotton canvas boots. The brand is owned by KP Global.

== History ==
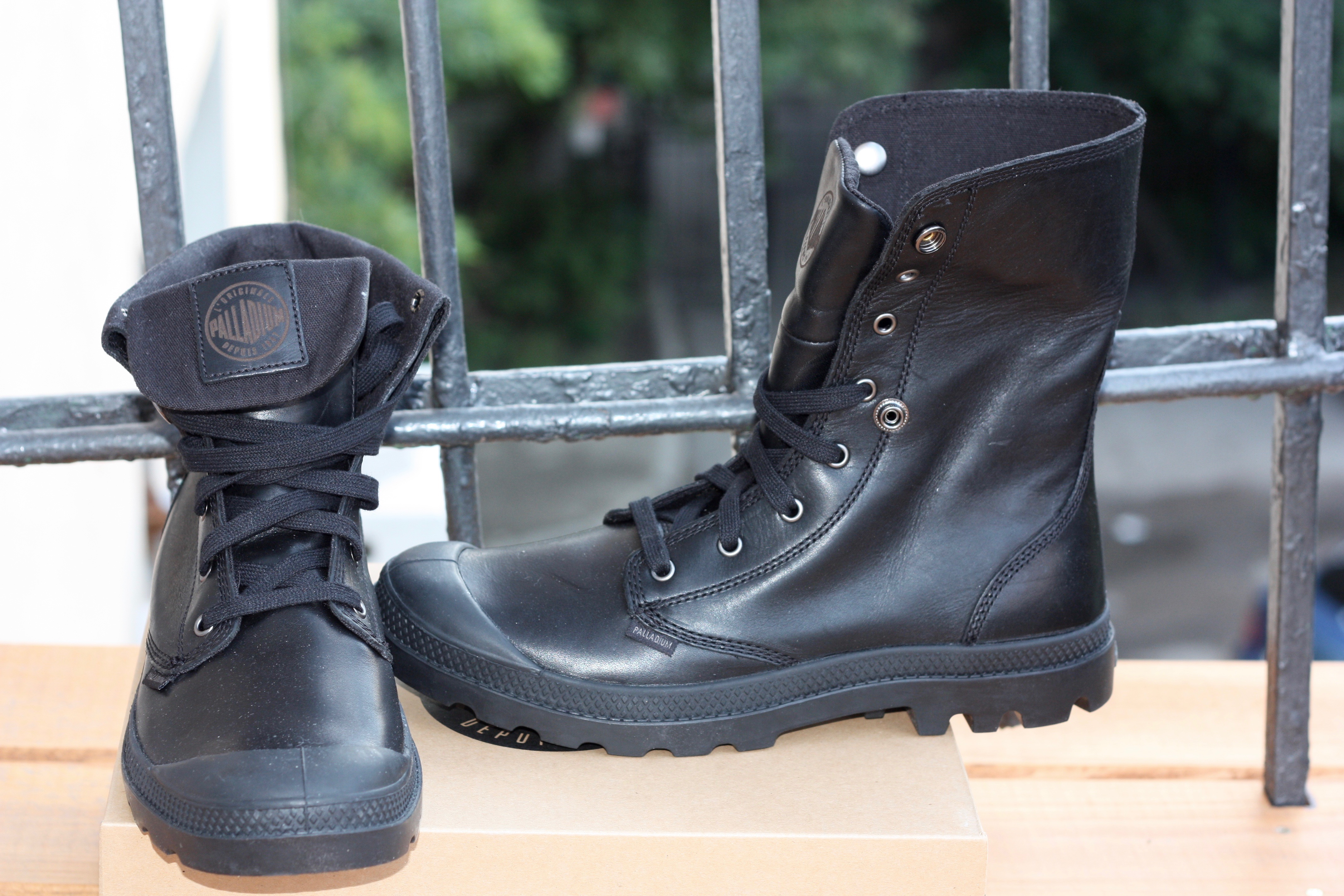
Palladium boots

Palladium was initially founded to supply equipment such as tyres for the aviation industry in 1920. After the end of World War II, the brand shifted to making shoes with rubber soles. The Palladium Pallabrouse boot was introduced in 1947 and was designed as a lightweight, quick-drying combat boot for the French Foreign Legion. Two years later, Palladium released the Pampa boot for the French paratroopers. In 1951, Palladium introduced the Palla Louvel basketball shoes, which became the official shoe of ASVEL Basket and was heavily endorsed by Alain Gilles. The Pallatennis sneakers became the unofficial shoes of student leaders during the social uprisings of 1968.

In 2011, Palladium collaborated with Pharrell Williams for a short documentary series titled Tokyo Rising, with Williams touring Tokyo and interviewing local musicians, artists, and fashion designers about their experiences following the 2011 Tōhoku earthquake and tsunami.

The Pampa boot was given a modern reinterpretation in 2017, with Canadian singer Shawn Mendes wearing a pair at Coachella.

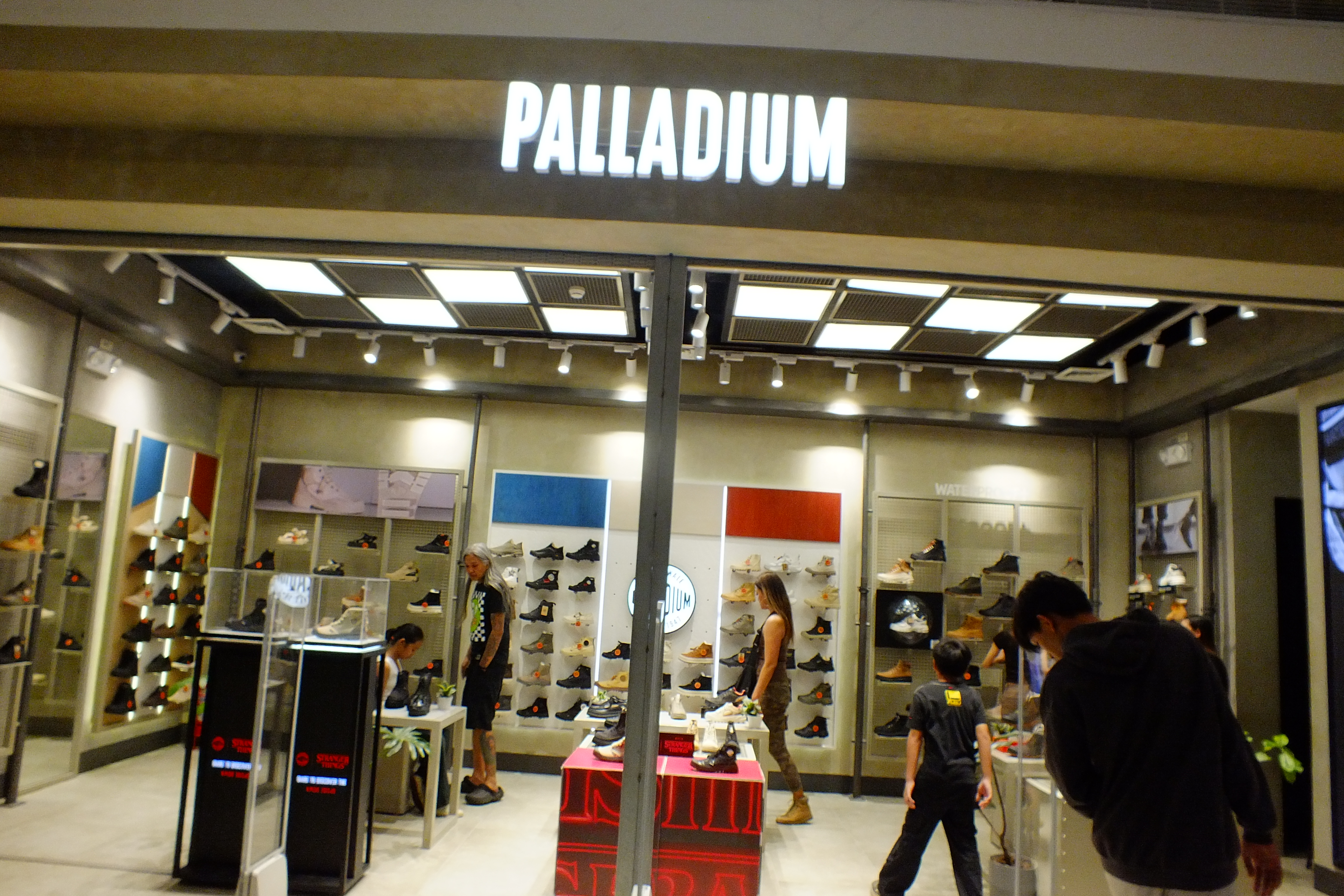
A Palladium branch at SM Mall of Asia, Pasay, Philippines

In 2019, Chinese firm Xtep acquired Palladium, along with K-Swiss and Supra, from South Korean firm E-Land Group. Xtep created the KP Global division to handle the Palladium and K-Swiss brands. Five years later, Xstep sold KP Global to controlling shareholder Ding Shuibo and his family.

In 2025, Palladium partnered with Netflix to release footwear themed after the TV series Stranger Things.

== See also ==
- Pataugas, another French manufacturer of similar footwear.
- Patauga jungle boots, a French Army boot model similar to the Palladium Pampa.
