= Xtep =

Chinese sports equipment company

Xtep International Holdings Limited 特步国际控股有限公司
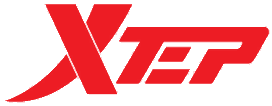
- Company type: Public
- Traded as: SEHK: 1368
- Industry: Sports equipment
- Founded: 2001; 25 years ago
- Headquarters: Xiamen, Fujian, China
- Area served: Worldwide
- Key people: Ding Shui Po (chairman)
- Products: Footwear, apparel, accessories
- Subsidiaries: KP Global
- Website: xtep.com.hk

Xtep
- Simplified Chinese: 特步
- Traditional Chinese: 特步
Transcriptions
Standard Mandarin
- Hanyu Pinyin: Tèbù

Xtep International Holdings Limited is a Chinese sportswear company based in Xiamen, Fujian. Established in 2001, the company has been traded on the Hong Kong Stock Exchange since 2008.

Xtep engages mainly in the design, development, manufacturing, sales, marketing and brand management of sports equipment, including footwear, apparel, and accessories. Xtep is a professional sports brand with an extensive distribution network of over 6,300 stores covering 31 provinces, autonomous regions and municipalities across the PRC and overseas. In 2019, Xtep had further diversified its brand portfolio which now includes four international brands, namely K-Swiss, Palladium, and the Chinese rights to Saucony and Merrell. Xtep is a constituent of the MSCI China Small Cap Index, Hang Seng Composite Index Series and Shenzhen-Hong Kong Stock Connect.

== Business development ==
The appointment of Hong Kong movie star Nicholas Tse as Xtep's spokesperson in 2001 marked the precedent of entertainment star spokesmanship among sports brands in mainland China. The sales of "Fire Shoes" products reached 1.2 million pairs in a few months.

In 2015, Xtep embarked on a journey as a professional sports brand with a focus on running. From 2015 to date, Xtep has remained as the sportswear sponsor of the highest number of marathons in mainland China. It has also sponsored numerous world-famous international sports teams, athletes, celebrities and variety shows.

Xtep adopted a multi-brand strategy in 2019. On 4 March, Xtep entered into an agreement with Wolverine World Wide Inc., a designer, marketer and licensor of a broad range of footwear and apparel brands, to form a joint venture to carry out the development, marketing and distribution of footwear, apparel and accessories under the Merrell and Saucony brands in mainland China, Hong Kong and Macau. On 1 August, Xtep completed the acquisition of K-Swiss Holdings, Inc. which holds globally renowned brands, K-Swiss and Palladium, for a cash consideration of US$260 million (approximately HK$2.03 billion).

In August 2019, Xtep signed on famous Asian American basketball player Jeremy Lin as spokesperson, marking its foray into the basketball business realm. Xtep also unveiled its "Basketball Product Co-Creation Plan" to come up with basketball products via product co-creation.

After previously supplying then-Premier League side Birmingham City and La Liga side Villarreal in 2010 and 2014 respectively, Xtep left the major football scene in 2017 and focused on other sports, mainly in running. In mid-2018, Xtep returned again to the football scene by signing a contract with Saudi Professional League side Al-Shabab ahead of the 2018–19 season in a reported three-year contract. On 13 October 2019, Egyptian Premier League side Al Ittihad Alexandria announced Xtep as their new official kit supplier until 2022, replacing German company Uhlsport.

In May 2024, Xtep announced that it would sell its subsidiary KP Global, which holds the K-Swiss and Palladium brands, to Ding Shui Po, its controlling shareholder and chairman.
