= San Marco Marine Brigade =

- Brigata Marina "San Marco"
- Badge of Italian naval riflemen
- Active: 1550-1914 (as the La Marina Regiment); 1914-1919 (as the Brigata Marina); 1919-1956; 1965-1994 (as the Marina Battaglione "San Marco"); 1994–2013 (as the San Marco Regiment); 2013-Present (as the San Marco Marine Brigade)
- Country: Italy
- Branch: Italian Navy
- Role: Naval infantry
- Size: ca. 3,800
- Garrison/HQ: Caserma "Carlotto", Brindisi, Italy
- Nickname: Marò
- Patron: St. Mark
- Mottos: "PER MARE, PER TERRAM"
- March: March: "Pace armata" (by Luigi Musso) Anthem: Inno della Brigata "San Marco"

Commanders
- Current commander: Rear admiral Massimiliano Giuseppe Grazioso

The "San Marco" Marine Brigade (Italian: Brigata Marina "San Marco") is an amphibious formation of the Italian Navy, has been brigade since 2013 but the amphibious corps existed since 1915, reorganizing the Navy Landing Force. It has its command in Brindisi. They are the marines of the Italian Navy.

It is a joint formation, framed within the amphibious projection force, whose commander is the same admiral who serves as commander of the San Marco Brigade.

== History ==
On January 26, the Regiment "La Marina" of the Kingdom of Sardinia (established in 1717) was expanded, becoming the Brigata di Marina: to the already existing regiment of sailors, was also added an infantry regiment. With this distribution, the formation participated in the 1848 at the First Italian War of Independence, distinguishing itself in the battles of Novara, Goito, Pastrengo, and Peschiera, and later was dissolved. Recognized as a Regiment in the 1861 in the Italian Royal Navy, it joined the battle of Lissa and then it was dissolved again in the 1878, following the will of the Italian Admiral Benedetto Brin.

The formation previously known as the San Marco Battalion later became the San Marco Regiment in the 1990s.

A joint Italian-Spanish landing force (SILF - Spanish Italian Landing Force) was established on 23 November 1996, in order to operate in international combat theaters on behalf of NATO.

The SILF was structured in the form of an amphibious brigade, consisting of two manoeuvre units, one being "San Marco" Regiment, of marine infantry, artillery, anti-armour and air defense weapons, reconnaissance and demolition, engineers, helicopters and air support, IFVs and assault vehicles.

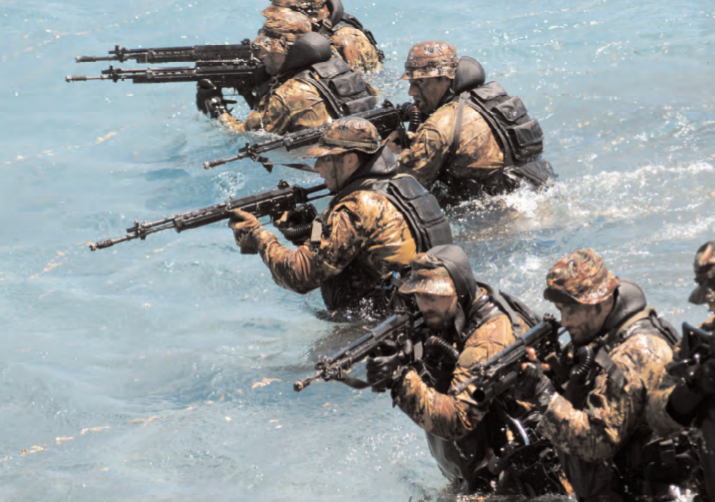
San Marco marines

On 1 October 1999, the Landing Force of the Navy was created, under the command of a Rear Admiral, stationed in Brindisi Naval Base and formed in two regiments: the "San Marco" Regiment and the "Carlotto" Regiment, both controlled by a Captain, and the Landing Craft Group, commanded by a Commander.

The Landing Force was renamed from 1 March 2013 as "San Marco" Marine Brigade, still being based in Brindisi, but consisting of three regiments, totalling about 3,800 marines. It is commanded by an Admiral, reporting directly to the Commander in Chief of the Italian Navy Fleet Command (CINCNAV).

== Organization ==
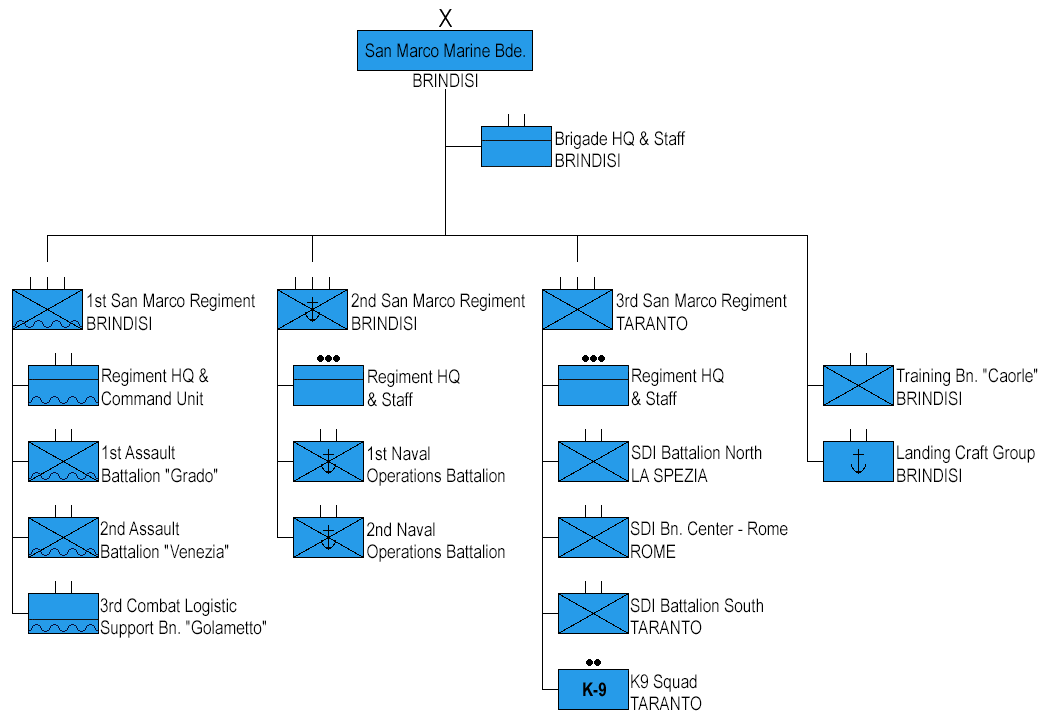
San Marco Marine Brigade structure 2020 (click to enlarge)

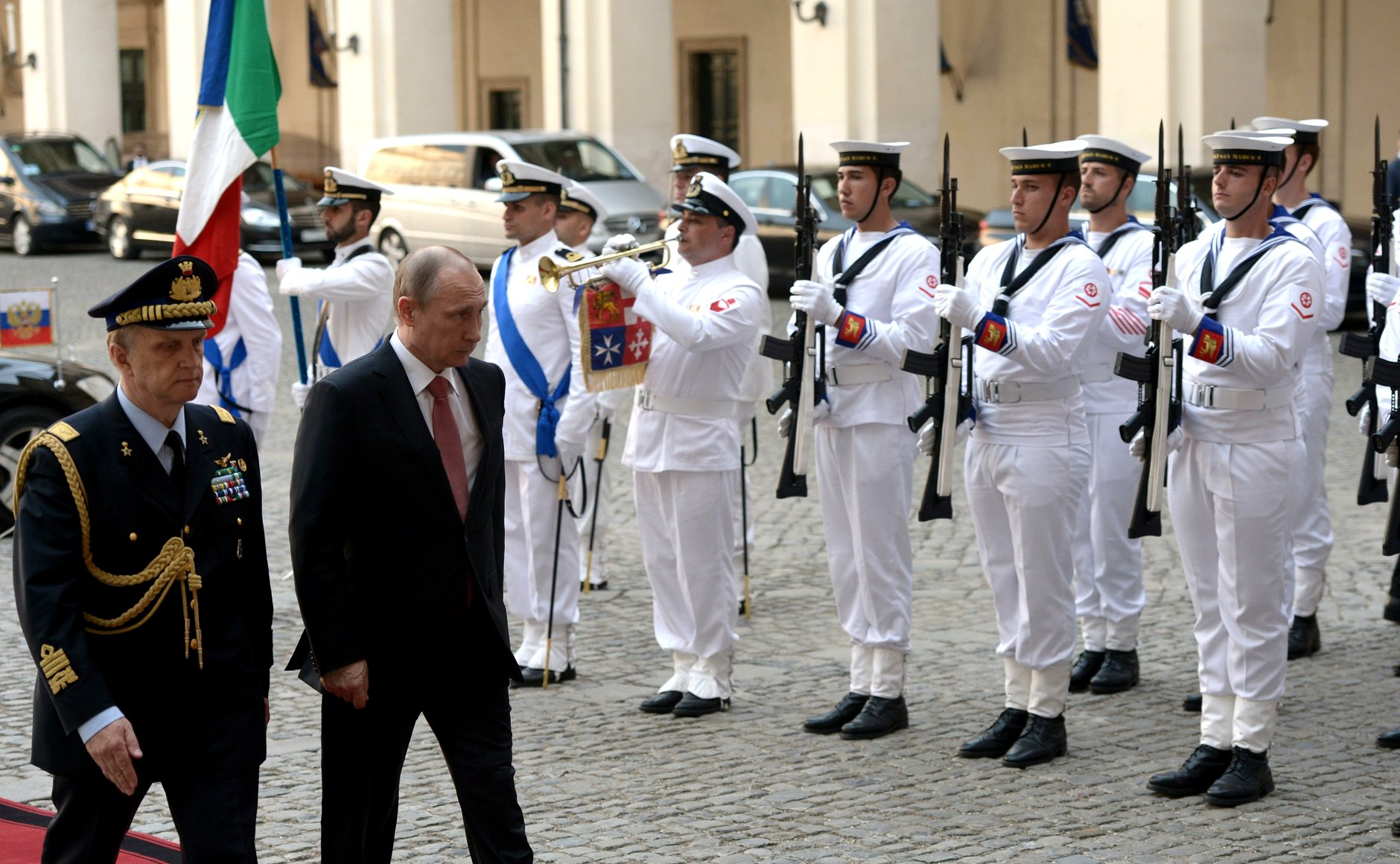
The 1st Honor Guard Company of the 3rd San Marco Regiment at the Quirinale Palace during the visit of Vladimir Putin to Rome, June 2015

The brigade is organized as follows:

=== San Marco Marine Brigade ===
The San Marco Marine Brigade and the Navy's 3rd Naval Division form together with the Italian Army's Cavalry Brigade "Pozzuolo del Friuli" the Italian military's National Sea Projection Capability (Forza di proiezione dal mare).

- San Marco Marine Brigade (Brigata Marina San Marco - COMFORSBARC), in Brindisi
  - Brigade Headquarters (Quartier Generale della Brigata Marina San Marco - QUARTGEN Brigata Marina San Marco), in Brindisi
  - Amphibious Integration Centre (Centro Integrazione Anfibia), in Brindisi
  - Training Battalion "Caorle" (Battaglione Scuole "Caorle"), in Brindisi
    - Formation Company
    - Advanced Training, Qualification and Specialization Company
  - Navy Landing Craft Group (Gruppo mezzi da sbarco della Marina Militare), in Brindisi - mans the landing craft of the amphibious ships and manages the ship-to-beach traffic
    - Propulsion and Vessels Section
    - Maritime Section
    - Beach Organization Section
    - Landing Craft Team, with 9× LCM62-class Landing Craft Mechanized and 4× LCM23-class Landing Craft Mechanized
    - Boat Team, with 20× MTP96-class Landing Craft Vehicle Personnel

==== 1st San Marco Regiment ====
- 1st San Marco Regiment (1° Reggimento San Marco), in Brindisi - amphibious landing force
  - Command Unit (Reparto Comando)
    - Command Company with an Air Support Element team
    - Signal Company
    - Paratroopers Swimmers Company
      - 2× Reconnaissance platoons, 2× SALT platoons (Supporting Arms Liaison Team)
    - EOD/IEDD Engineer Platoon
    - FHT Platoon (Field HUMINT Team)
  - 1st Assault Battalion "Grado" (1° Battaglione Assalto "Grado")
    - 1st Assault Company "Bafile"
      - 3× Assault platoons, 1× support weapons platoon
    - 2nd Assault Company "Tobruk"
      - 3× Assault platoons, 1× support weapons platoon
    - Support Weapons Company
      - 1× Command support platoon, 1× AAV7-A1 platoon with amphibious assault vehicles (being replaced by Amphibious Combat Vehicles)
  - 2nd Assault Battalion "Venezia" (2° Battaglione Assalto "Venezia")
    - 3rd Assault Company "An Nassiriya"
      - 3× Assault platoons, 1× support weapons platoon
    - 4th Assault Company "Monfalcone"
      - 3× Assault platoons, 1× support weapons platoon
    - Support Weapons Company
      - 1× Command support platoon, 1× AAV7-A1 platoon with amphibious assault vehicles (being replaced by Amphibious Combat Vehicles)
  - 3rd Combat Logistic Support Battalion "Golametto" (3° Battaglione Supporto Logistico al Combattimento "Golametto")
    - Command Support Platoon
    - Logistic Company
    - Tactical Transport Company
    - Medical Company

==== 2nd San Marco Regiment ====
- 2nd San Marco Regiment (2° Reggimento San Marco), in Brindisi - maritime interdiction operations and embarked naval protection teams
  - Mobility Team
  - 1st Naval Operations Battalion (1° Battaglione Operazioni Navali), in Brindisi
    - 2× Naval operations companies, each with 10× ship teams
  - 2nd Naval Operations Battalion (2° Battaglione Operazioni Navali), in Brindisi
    - Force Protection Company, with 10× teams
    - Port Protection Company, with 10× teams

==== 3rd San Marco Regiment ====
- 3rd San Marco Regiment (3° Reggimento San Marco), in Taranto - installations defense service (Servizio difesa installazioni - SDI)
  - 1st Honor Guard Company, in Rome
  - National Emergencies Company (Naval civil protection), in Taranto
  - K9 Unit, in Taranto
  - SDI Battalion North (Battaglione SDI Nord), in La Spezia
    - Command Support Team
    - Telecommunications Team
    - SDI Company Liguria, in La Spezia
      - 3× SDI platoons: in La Spezia (Military Harbour), Luni (Navy Helicopter Station), and Ancona (Ammunition Depot Poggio)
    - SDI Company Sardinia, in La Maddalena
      - 3× SDI platoons: at La Maddalena (Non-commissioned Officers School), Santo Stefano (Ammunition Depot), and Tavolara (NATO Very Low Frequency Station)
  - SDI Battalion Centre - Rome (Battaglione SDI Centro - Roma), in Rome
    - Command Support Team
    - Telecommunications Team
    - SDI Company Rome, at the Navy General Staff
  - SDI Battalion South (Battaglione SDI Sud), in Taranto
    - Command Support Team
    - Telecommunications Team
    - SDI Company Taranto, in Taranto
      - 3x SDI platoons: in Taranto (Military Harbour), Grottaglie (Navy Helicopter Station), and Pozzuoli (Ammunition Depot Montagna Spaccata)
    - SDI Company Brindisi, in Brindisi
      - 3x SDI platoons: in Brindisi (Military Harbour), Mesagne (Ammunition Depot), and at the San Marco Marine Brigade headquarter
    - SDI Company Sicily, in Augusta
      - 4x SDI platoons: in Augusta (Military Harbour), Priolo Gargallo (Ammunition Depot Cava di Sorciaro), Catania (Navy Helicopter Station), and the NATO Pier in Augusta

==== 4th Carlotto Regiment ====
The 4th Regiment "Carlotto" was formed in 2026 and is based in Brindisi. The regiment provides logistic and medical support to the Marine Brigade "San Marco".

- 4th Carlotto Regiment (4° Reggimento "Carlotto"), in Brindisi
  - Cortellazzo Transport Battalion (Battaglione Trasporti Cortellazzo)
  - Technical Maintenance Support Battalion (Battaglione Supporto Tecnico Manutentivo), in Mesagne
  - Medical Unit (Reparto Sanitario)
  - Support Unit (Reparto Sostegno)
  - Infrastructure Technical Service (Servizio Tecnico Infrastrutture)
  - Massafra Training and Instruction Component (Componente Formativa Addestrativa Massafra), in Massafra

== 3rd Naval Division ==
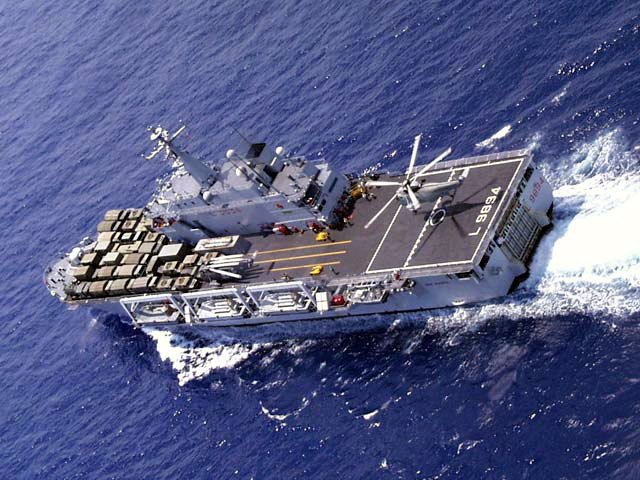
San Giusto at sea

The brigade is transported by the navy's 3rd Naval Division, co-located with the brigade in Brindisi, which consists of the following ships:

- Landing helicopter dock: Trieste
- San Giorgio-class amphibious transport docks: San Giorgio, San Marco, San Giusto

== Equipment ==
- Beretta 92FS service pistol
- Heckler & Koch MP5A3 submachine gun
- Beretta ARX160 service rifle
- GLX-160 underslung grenade launcher for the ARX160
- FN Minimi light machine gun
- MG 42/59 machine gun
- M2 heavy machine gun
- Panzerfaust 3 anti-tank rocket
- Spike anti-tank guided missile
- FIM-92 Stinger man-portable air-defense system
- 81mm mortars
- 120mm mortars

== See also ==
- Italian Navy
- San Marco Regiment
- Lagunari
- Marines
