= 1st San Marco Regiment =

Maritime infantry of the Italian Armed Forces

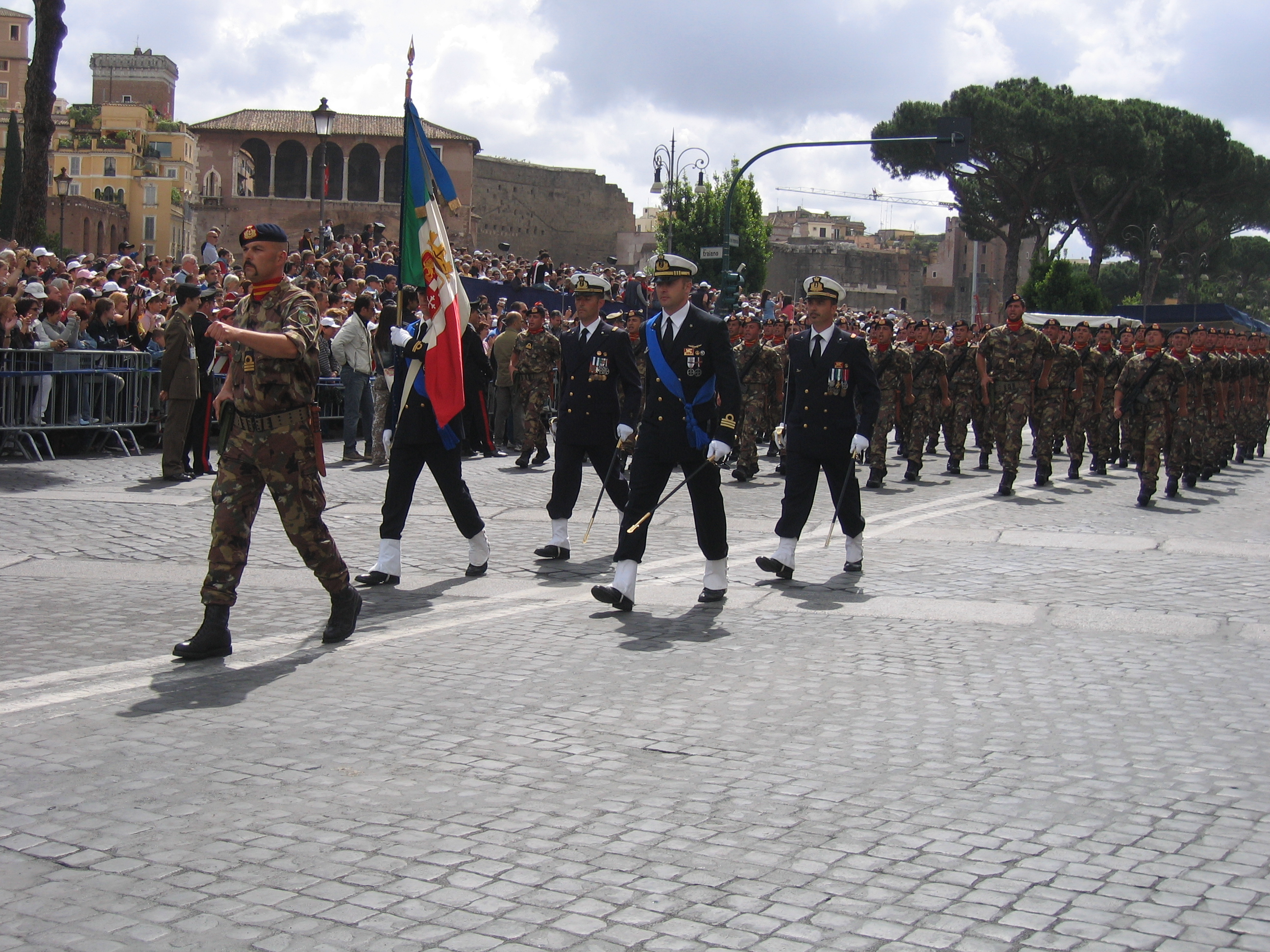
The San Marco parading in Rome, on 2 June 2007

The 1st San Marco Regiment (Italian: 1° Reggimento San Marco), located in Brindisi, is an amphibious formation of the Italian Navy. They are the Italian marines. Until the middle of the 1990s the unit was known as the San Marco Battalion (Battaglione San Marco), until it was expanded beyond battalion size because of the new geopolitical situation after the end of the Cold War and an increasing number of international missions, after as the San Marco Regiment. In 2013 it became part of the San Marco Marine Brigade as 1st San Marco Regiment.

== History ==
The marines of Italy was created as Fanti da Mar in 1550 in the Republic of Venice.

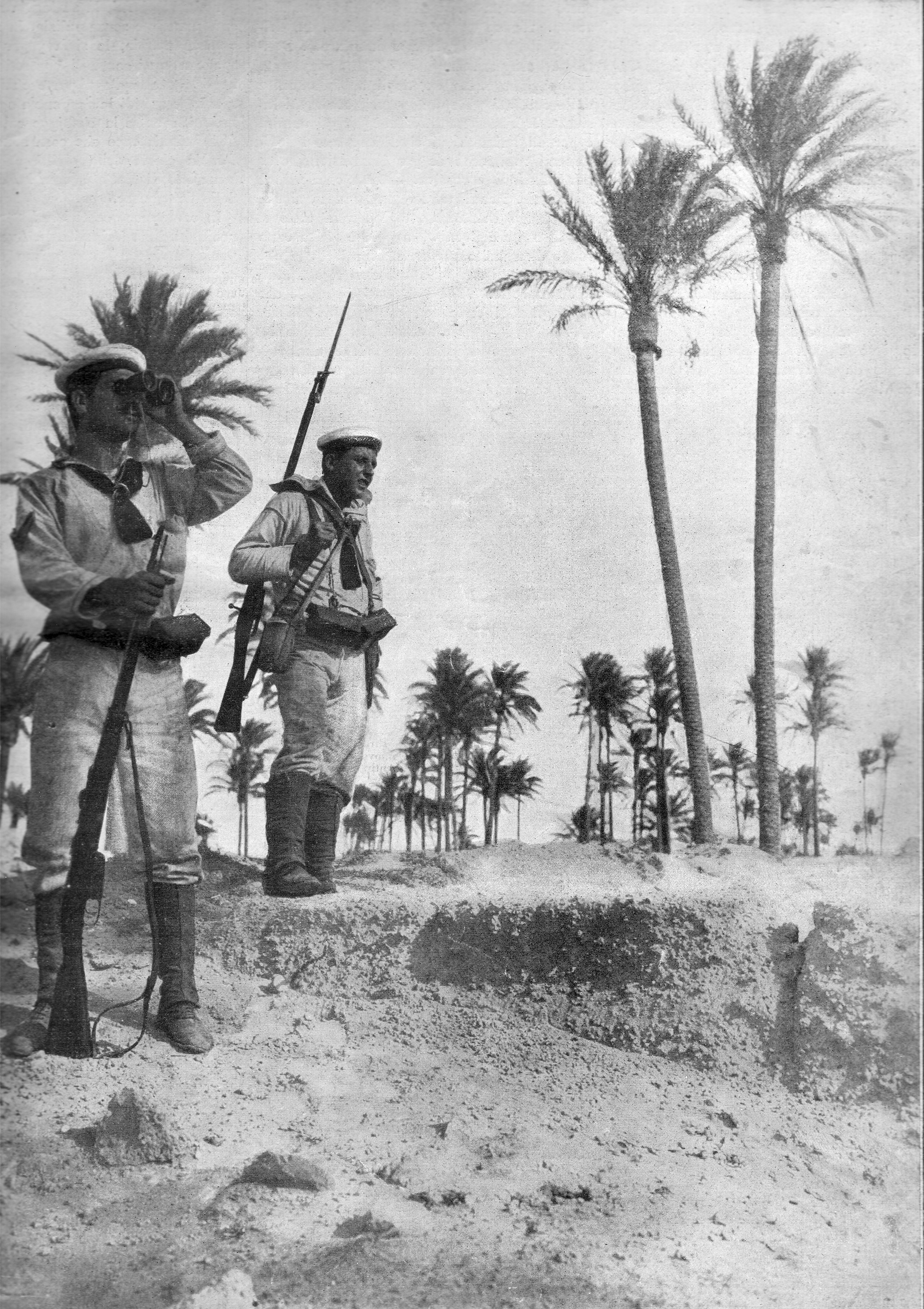
Italian marines in Tripoli in 1911

The San Marco Regiment traces its history back to the La Marina Regiment, formed in 1713. During the Wars of Italian Independence the Italian Marines were known as the Fanteria Real Marina, units of specially selected sailors who were skilled marksmen. The regiment also played an important role in Peking during the Boxer Rebellion and in the Italo-Turkish War.

With the beginning of the Italian campaign during World War I, the unit was named the Brigata Marina (Naval Brigade), and included two regiments, one infantry and one artillery. The brigade's infantry battalions were drawn from various Army and customs units, in addition to sailors from the torpedoed Italian navy cruiser Amalfi who were hastily equipped as infantry. Following the Battle of Caporetto in October–November 1917, the Italian front had almost collapsed and the Marina Brigade fought in the defence of Venice during the Battle of the Piave River. After the war, the grateful city presented a flag with the Lion of Saint Mark, from Venice's coat of arms, to the marines of the Naval Brigade. The Naval Brigade was renamed the San Marco Brigade because of the connection with Venice, and the Italian ship of the same name that was sunk in World War I.

Between the two world wars only a “San Marco Battalion” existed. A special unit of the battalion was sent to garrison the Italian concession in Tianjin, China in 1924 and stayed there until it was interned by the Japanese in 1943, when Italy declared war on the Axis. In the confusion, one post resisted, holding out against Japanese attacks for 24 hours before surrendering. The interned Italians were then given the choice to represent the collaborationist fascist government, or become prisoners of war. The San Marco Battalion also served during the Second Italo-Abyssinian War.

At the beginning of the Second World War it became a two battalion regiment and later increased in size, and prepared for amphibious landings at Cape Martin in France which never happened. When Italy attacked Yugoslavia in April 1941, the San Marco Marines carried out successful landings on several islands in the Adriatic and seized ports against minimal resistance. The regiment expanded to seven battalions before the final desert battles in 1943, including the Battaglione Nuotatori who were trained as parachutists in 1941. The 3rd Battalion of the 'San Marco' Regiment, which became known as the Tobruk battalion, repelled landings by British Commandos at Tobruk during the night of 13/14 September 1942, in the course of the botched Operation Agreement. As a result, 200 British Commandos were taken prisoner.

The regiment fought at Tobruk and Tunisia, where it defended the Mareth line during April and May 1943. The Tobruk Battalion was later destroyed on the night of 5 April 1943 while defending the Oidane-el-Hachana line against an attack on Wadi Akarit by the British 69th Infantry Brigade and Gurkha units from the Indian Army 4th Infantry Division.

"When we were about ten yards away we had reached the top of the slit trench and we killed any of the survivors," recalled British infantryman Bill Cheall, who had just seen his section leader shot down by a San Marco Marine. "It was no time for pussy footing, we were intoxicated with rage and had to kill them to pay for our fallen pal." The Italian Marines, well dug-in and plentifully supplied with automatic weapons and grenades, fought well, and casualties among the 6th Green Howards were severe; two senior officers, six senior NCO's and junior officers and one hundred and eighteen other ranks killed.

German General Hans-Jürgen von Arnim later said of the San Marco Marines fighting abilities in Tunisia in 1943, that they were "the best soldiers I ever commanded".

Following the Italian surrender in 1943, many San Marco marines fought for the Allies against the Germans, however the 4th (Caorle) Battalion fought for the Axis until the end of the war.

The San Marco Marine Regiment was deactivated in 1956 but was reformed on 1 January 1965 to battalion strength (Battaglione Marina "San Marco") in Venice with 750 personnel. During the Italian-Yugoslav tensions of Trieste and Istria, the Yugoslav head of state Tito requested the Italian government move the unit from Venice, because he believed it represented a possible aggression against Yugoslavia, and that it was not necessary for the defense of Italy according to the 1947 Paris Peace Treaty. The battalion was then shifted to Brindisi Naval Base in Southern Italy and integrated completely into the Italian Navy. In Venice, the Italian Army had earlier reconstituted its Lagunari this time as its amphibious infantry force, its presence was also the reason why the battalion moved south. From 1982 to 1984 the San Marco battalion took part in international UN peacekeeping missions in Lebanon.

Today the San Marco Marine Regiment consists of the Amphibious Battalion Grado and the Support Battalion Golametto with approximately 1,500 marines. Combined with the Logistics and Training Regiment “Carlotto”, landing boats and helicopters, the San Marco Regiment can conduct amphibious assaults and landings. If necessary, the San Marco Regiment can be reinforced by the Army's Lagunari. The naval command is connected by a unified operations staff and is closely associated with the Spanish Marines through the SILF joint landing force. The San Marco Regiment has been active in international peace-keeping operations. Since the early 1980s the unit has deployed to Lebanon, the Persian Gulf, Somalia, Albania, Bosnia-Herzegovina, Kosovo, East Timor, Eritrea and Iraq. The San Marco and the Lagunari were used together for the first time in operation UNIFIL after the 2006 Lebanon war in a peacekeeping mission as the “Initial Entry Force” in the early hours of the morning 2 September 2006.

Two marines from the San Marco Regiment, Massimiliano Latorre and Salvatore Girone, are currently under trial in India and face murder charges for allegedly shooting dead two Indian fishermen, Ajeesh Pinki and Gelastine, 20.5 nm off the coast of Kerala. The 2012 Italian shooting in the Laccadive Sea created a diplomatic dispute between Italy and India over matters of court jurisdiction and functional immunity. The diplomatic row developed into a stand-off with India in March 2013 and resulted in the resignation of Italian foreign minister Giulio Terzi on 26 March 2013. Court proceedings have continued.

Since 2013 the San Marco Regiment is now part of the larger San Marco Marine Brigade as the 1st San Marco Marine Regiment.

== Organization ==
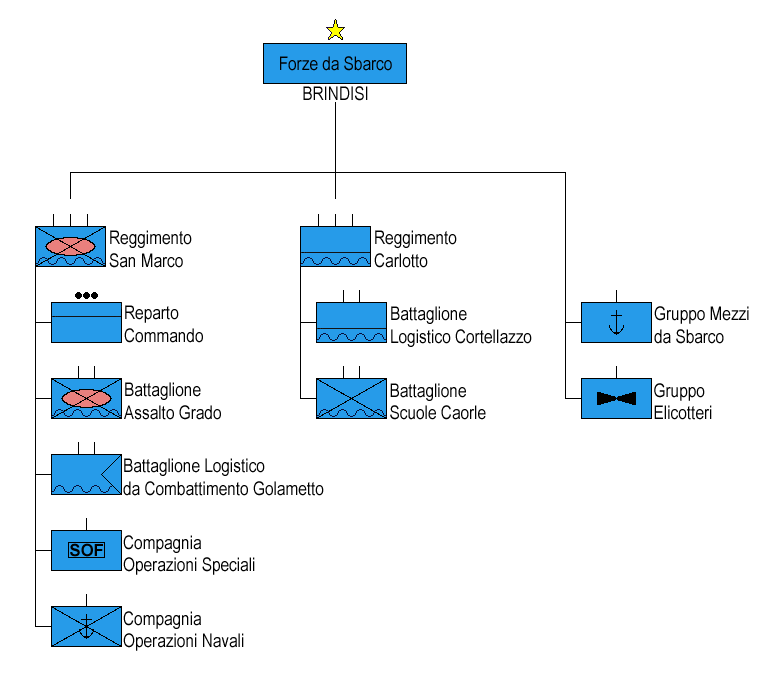
Structure of the Amphibious Forces Command (COMFORSBARC).

- Naval Landing Force
  - 1st San Marco Regiment
    - Regiment HQ
    - Assault Battalion Grado
    - Marine Battalion Venezia
    - Logistic Support Battalion Golametto
  - Carlotto Regiment
    - Logistic Support Battalion Cortellazzo
    - Battalion Schools Caorle
  - Naval Operations Company
  - Special Operations Company (Compagnia Operazioni Speciali Andrea Bafile)
  - Landing Vessels Group

The support elements of the regiment include a telecommunications center; a coordination center for fire support; air observer and coastal defense forces; and staff.

Advanced force and reconnaissance operations are undertaken by a separate company (“Demolitori di Ostacoli Antisbarco DOA” today called "Compagnia Operazioni Speciali Andrea Bafile"), tasked primarily with the clearing of landing zones and the removal of barriers, obstacles and mines. The marines can be landed by helicopters, speedboats or from submarines. The DOA/Bafile Company trains with the commando frogmen of the Italian Fleet Command Special Forces COMSUBIN GOI, who themselves are drawn largely from the ranks of the San Marco marines. COMSUBIN wear an emerald green beret.

Another separate company, consisting of about 180 men, the Naval Operation Company, leads the boarding teams. These units of about 8 to 10 men conduct boardings and inspections of shipping, e.g. in embargo measures.

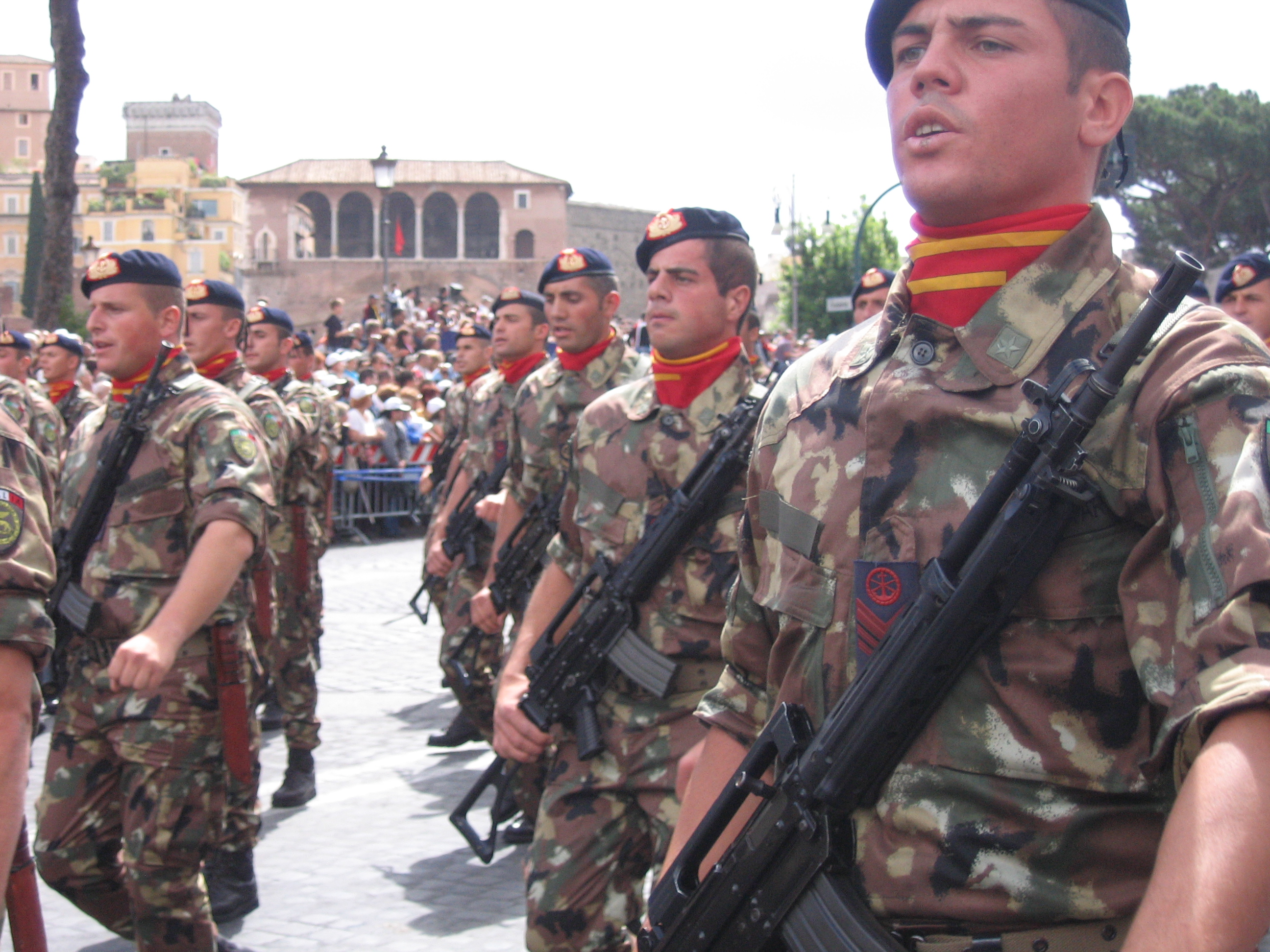
A detachment of the Grado battalion parading on 2 June 2007

The Grado battalion contains the actual naval infantry component of the Italian Navy. The battalion consists of a staff and supply company, three naval infantry companies, plus a 'heavy' company.

Each of the three combat companies consists of three 37 man platoons and a 21-man fire support section. These companies can be brought ashore with amphibious vehicles and boats or with helicopters. In other cases they can operate as mechanized infantry with a modified version of the M113 (“VCC-1”).

The heavy company forms the combat support component of the battalion with their air defense and anti-armour weapons as well as with the 120mm mortar .

Logistical support is conducted by the Golametto battalion. It contains transport and logistics companies, as well as a medical unit. The members of this battalion are fully trained naval infantrymen, who give landing operations the necessary combat logistical and technical support to the Grado battalion. General tasks of support fall into the scope of responsibility of the Carlotto regiment, which supplies the Golametto battalion with the necessary materials before deployment depending upon operational orders .

== Heraldry ==
The marines of the 1st San Marco Regiment are designated as Marine Riflemen. Their rank system is similar to the Italian Navy except that Marines holding the ranks of comuni up to Sottocapo di Prima Classe Scelto q.s. are distinguished by a sailor's collar on the uniform and a navy blue beret (guards of honor only wear sailor caps). Both the Navy's San Marco marines and the Army's Lagunari amphibious infantry have the Lion of Saint Mark in their coat of arms. Plans to consolidate both organizations together (as it was during the early '50s when both Army and Navy contributed to a naval infantry unit known as the Settore Forze Lagunari that after became the Lagunari regiment) was abandoned in the mid-1990s. Today, however, close co-operation exists because of a common operations staff in Brindisi, which has continued to strengthen ties between the two units ( Forza di Proiezione dal Mare ).

== Equipment ==
=== Small arms ===
- Beretta 92FS (pistol, 9mm)
- Heckler & Koch MP5 (submachine gun)
- Beretta M12 S2 (submachine gun)
- Beretta Mx4 Storm (submachine gun)
- Beretta AR70/90 (assault rifle, 5.56mm)
- Beretta ARX 160 (assault rifle, 5.56mm)
- M203 (grenade launcher, 40 mm)
- FN Minimi (light machine gun, 5.56mm)
- MG42/59 (machine gun, 7.62×51mm)
- Browning M2 (heavy machine gun, 12.7mm)
- Barret 12,7 mm (sniper rifle)
- McMillan 12,7 mm (sniper rifle)
- Accuracy .338 Lapua (sniper rifle)

=== Heavy weapons ===
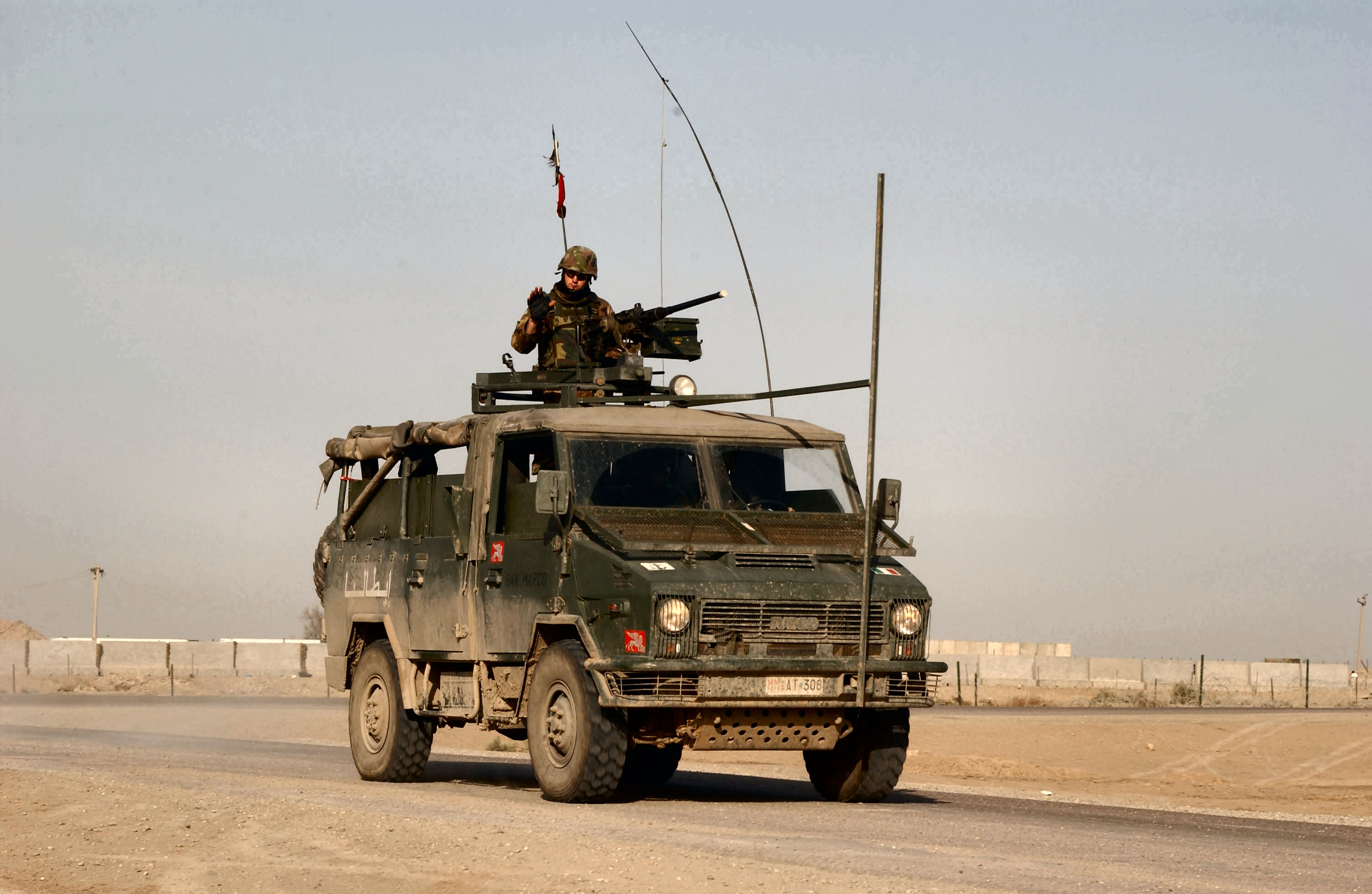
Iveco VM 90 of the Reggimento San Marco on mission in Iraq.

- Panzerfaust 3(anti tank rocket)
- Instalaza C90 (anti tank rocket)
- TOW (antitank defense guided weapon)
- MILAN (antitank defense guided weapon)
- Spike (antitank defense guided weapon)
- Stinger (air defense guided weapon)
- Mortar (81 mm)
- mortar (120 mm)

=== Armored vehicles ===
- Iveco VTLM Lince 4X4
- VCC-1 APC (M113)
- VCC-2 APC
- VAL M113 ARISGATOR
- LVTP-7 (AAV7, AAV7-A1)

=== Unarmored vehicles ===
- Iveco VM 90

=== Support vehicles ===
- Astra SM 44.31 4X4
- Astra HD6 66.45 6X6
- Astra SMH 66.45 6X6
- Astra SMH 66.45 T-ZAT 6X6 with trailer

== See also ==
- San Marco Marine Brigade, the formation comprising the San Marco Regiment.
- Lagunari, the Italian Army amphibious infantry regiment.
