= Sant'Andrea (Venetian Lagoon) =

Island in Venetian Lagoon, Italy

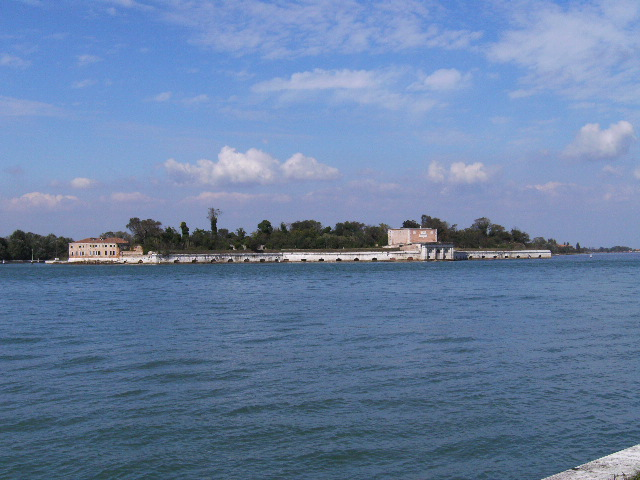
- View of the Island of Sant'Andrea from the Porto di San Nicolò at the Lido of Venice

- Location within Venetian Lagoon

Geography
- Coordinates: 45.434602°N 12.381146°E
- Adjacent to: Venetian Lagoon

Administration
- Italy
- Region: Veneto
- Province: Province of Venice

Sant'Andrea is a small island in the Venetian Lagoon, northern Italy.

It houses the Forte di Sant'Andrea, a large fortress built in the 16th century to defend Venice. Sant'Andrea constitutes a prolongation of the island of Vignole, from which it is separated by a narrow channel, towards the Porto di Lido-San Nicolò on the Lido, between Venice's Island and the island of Sant'Erasmo.
