= Lagunari Regiment "Serenissima" =

Active Italian Army amphibious infantry unit

- Reggimento Lagunari "Serenissima"
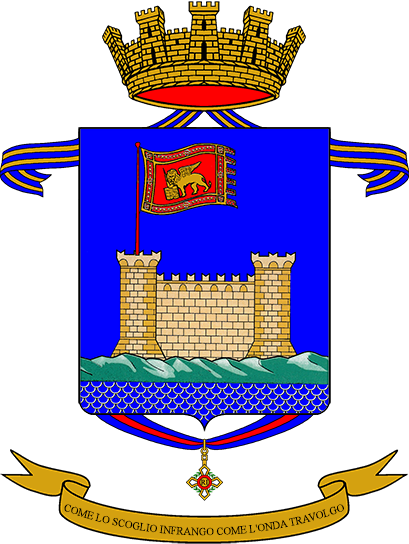
- Regimental coat of arms
- Active: 1 Sept. 1957 — today
- Country: Italy
- Branch: Italian Army
- Part of: Cavalry Brigade "Pozzuolo del Friuli"
- Garrison/HQ: Venice
- Mottos: "Come lo scoglio infrango, come l'onda travolgo"
- Anniversaries: 25 June 1984
- Decorations: 1x Military Order of Italy; 1x Gold Medal of Army Valor; 1x Silver Medal of Army Valor; 2x Silver Crosses of Army Merit

Insignia
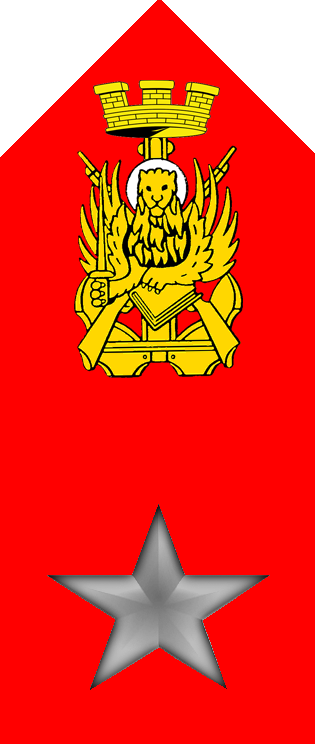
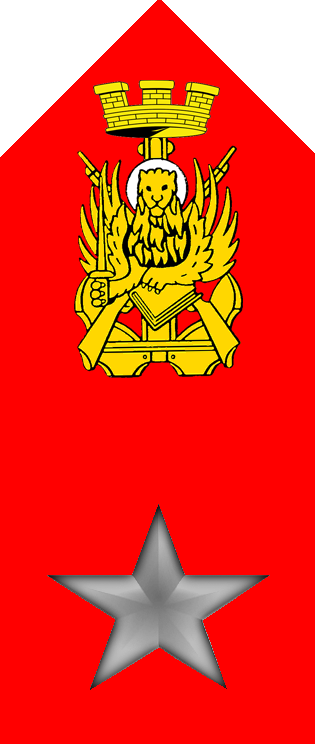
- Lagunari gorget patches

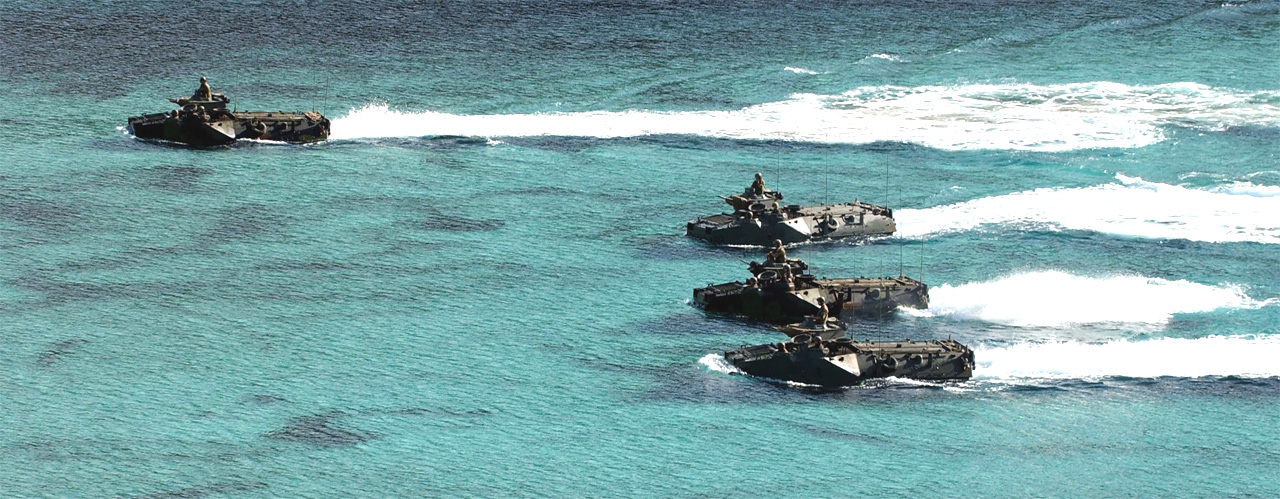
Lagunari during an exercise in Capo Teulada (Sardinia)

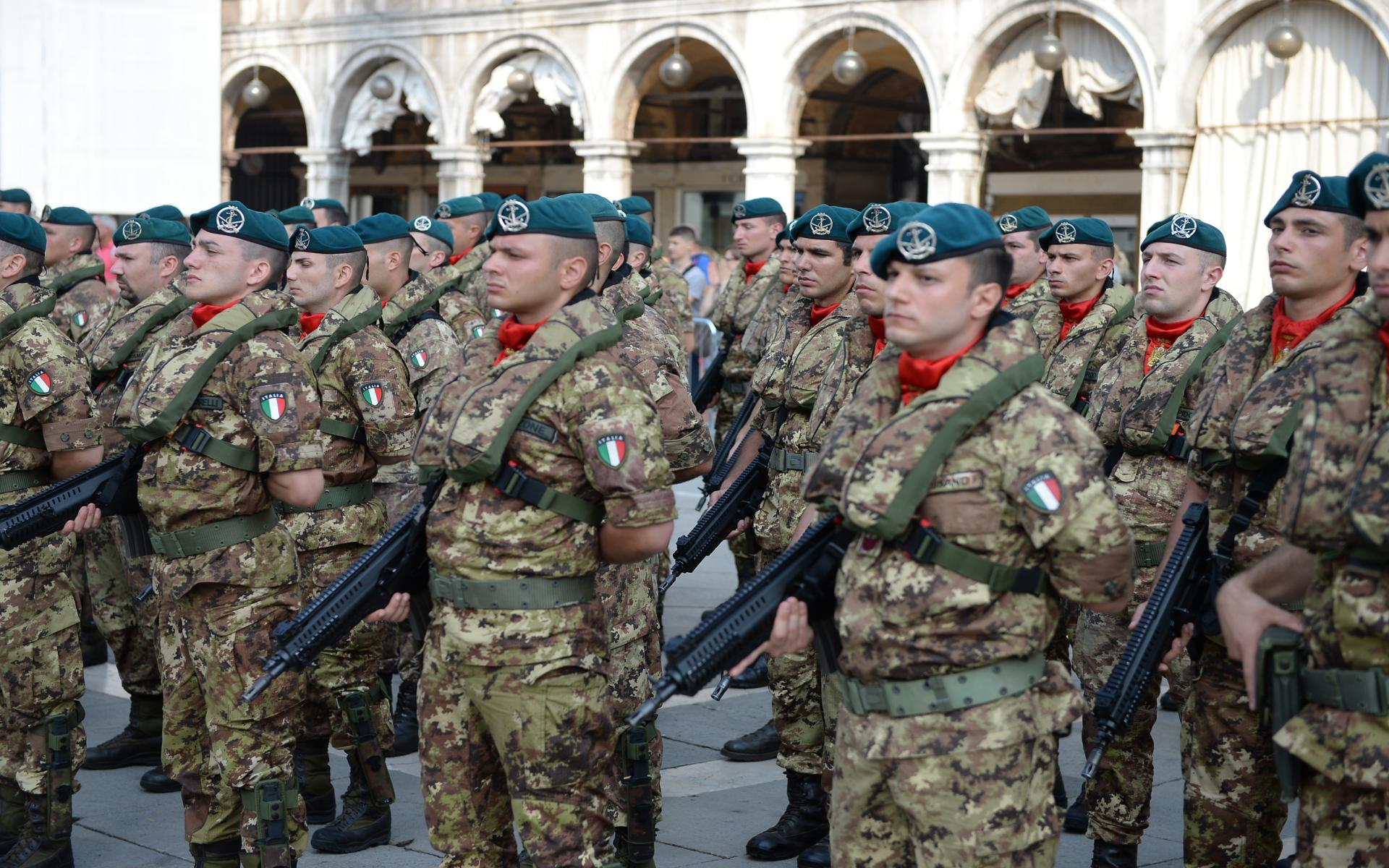
Lagunari in Venice

The Lagunari Regiment "Serenissima" (Italian: Reggimento Lagunari "Serenissima") is a unit of Italian Army's amphibious Lagunari speciality. The name of the speciality comes from the Italian word for lagoon (Italian: laguna), while the regiment's name "Serenissima" commemorates the Most Serene Republic of Venice (Italian: Serenissima Repubblica di Venezia). The regiment is based in Venice and assigned to the Cavalry Brigade "Pozzuolo del Friuli". The "Pozzuolo del Friuli" brigade forms, together with the Italian Navy's Third Naval Division and San Marco Marine Brigade, the Italian Armed Forces' Sea Projection Force (Italian: Forza di proiezione dal mare).

In 1957, Italian Army formed the Lagunari Regiment "Serenissima" in Venice, which was tasked with the defense of the coastal lagoons in the northern Adriatic Sea: the Venetian Lagoon, the Marano Lagoon, and the Grado Lagoon. Although the Lagunari are the youngest speciality of the Italian Army's infantry, the regiment carries the traditions of the naval infantry of the Republic of Venice, the traditions of the Republic of San Marco's Cacciatori del Sile, the traditions of Royal Italian Army's engineer arm's Lagunari units of World War I, and the traditions of the Amphibious Battalion "Sile". The regiment's anniversary falls, as for all Lagunari units, on 25 June 1984, the day the Lagunari were elevated to a speciality of the Italian Army's infantry arm.

== History ==
=== Republic of Venice ===
In 1550, the Republic of Venice formed a corps of embarked troops for the Venetian fleet, which were named Fanti da Mar (Infantry of the Sea). Present on all Venetian ships the Fanti da Mar were disbanded after the Fall of the Republic of Venice on 12 May 1797.

=== Republic of San Marco ===
In 1848, revolutions erupted in the Italian states, which led to the First Italian War of Independence. On 17 March 1848, the people of Venice rose up against Habsburg rule and freed Daniele Manin and other revolutionaries from Habsburg imprisonment. On 22 March 1848, the citizens of Venice stormed the Arsenal and distributed its weapons to the citizens of the city. On the same day, Manin proclaimed Venice's independence and the Republic of San Marco. On 26 March 1848, Austrian forces fled from Venice. The news of the successful insurrection in Venice spread to the other cities of the former Republic of Venice, which formed volunteer units to fight the Austrian occupation forces. One such unit were the Cacciatori del Sile, a light infantry unit formed by the cities of Treviso and Padua and named for the Sile river, which straddles the Venetian Lagoon. On 21 October 1848, the unit moved through the Venetian Lagoon to attack Austrian forces on the Cavallino peninsula. After routing the Austrians the unit returned to its base in Venice-Lido, where General Guglielmo Pepe honored the unit with a visit on 23 October. On 4 May 1849, Austrian forces, which in the meantime had defeated the Kingdom of Sardinia in the First Italian War of Independence, began the Siege of Venice with an attack against the fort of Marghera. On 26 May 1849, the fort at Marghera had to be evacuated and Venice's defenders fell back to the city itself, which was heavily bombarded by the Austrian Army and Navy. On 22 August 1849, Venice surrendered and five days later, on 27 August, Austrian forces entered the city and the Cacciatori del Sile were disbanded.

=== Kingdom of Italy ===
In 1866, after the Third Italian War of Independence, the Austro-Hungarian Empire ceded the parts of the Kingdom of Lombardy–Venetia, which it still controlled, to the Second French Empire, which in turn ceded it to the Kingdom of Italy. On 1 January 1877, the Royal Italian Army's 2nd Engineer Regiment formed the 14th Sappers Company (Lagunari), which was based in Venice and tasked with operating in the Venetian Lagoon, Marano Lagoon, and Grado Lagoon. On 1 January 1883, the company was transferred to the newly formed 4th Engineer Regiment. On 1 November 1887, the 4th Engineer Regiment formed a second Lagunari company and the two companies were renumbered as 9th Lagunari Company respectively 10th Lagunari Company.

=== World War I ===
In May 1915, just before Italy's entry into World War I, the 4th Engineer Regiment (Pontieri) formed the 15th Lagunari Company. On 1 December 1915, the 4th Engineer Regiment (Pontieri) formed the 20th, 21st, 22nd, 23rd, and 24th Lagunari companies. From 1915 to 1918, the Lagunari were tasked with maintaining a 1,700 kilometer long navigable network lagoons and rivers of the Mantua-Ferrara-Marano Lagoon triangle. After the Battle of Caporetto and the Italian retreat to the Piave river the Lagunari companies operated on the extreme right flank of the Italian front in the Piave estuary and along the Sile river. In June and July 1918, the Lagunari companies fought during the Second Battle of the Piave River on the lower Piave and along the Sile river.

On 28 August 1918, the Royal Italian Army formed the 8th Engineer Regiment (Lagunari) in Ferrara, which received the eight existing Laguanri companies. The regiment consisted of a command, the I Lagunari Battalion in Venice with the 9th, 15th, 20th, and 23rd Lagunari companies, and the II Lagunari Battalion with the 10th, 21st, 22nd, and 24th Lagunari companies in Ferrara. In October 1918, the regiment formed the 1st Train Company and the same month the regiment's companies were heavily engaged in the Piave delta during the Battle of Vittorio Veneto. In November 1918, the regiment moved from Ferrara to Venice, where it was disbanded on 21 November 1919. The regiment's last remaining battalion, which consisted of two Lagunari companies, was returned on the same day to the 4th Engineer Regiment (Pontieri), which was renamed on the same day Pontieri and Lagunari Engineer Regiment.

=== Interwar years ===
On 1 March 1926, the Pontieri and Lagunari Engineer Regiment shortened its name to Pontieri and Lagunari Regiment. On 15 May 1933, the regiment was split into the 1st Pontieri Regiment (Light Bridges) and 2nd Pontieri Regiment (Heavy Bridges). The 1st Pontieri Regiment was based in Verona and received the II Pontieri Battalion in Verona, the IV Pontieri Battalion in Rome, and the V Lagunari Battalion in Venice. The 1st Pontieri Regiment formed these units into two Pontieri battalions, with each battalion also fielding two Lagunari companies. On 1 October 1938, the Lagunari companies were disbanded and their personnel merged into the regiment's bridge companies.

=== Cold War ===
On 15 January 1951, the Italian Armed Forces began with the formation of the Lagoonal Forces Sector Command (Italian: Comando Settore Forze Lagunari) in Venice Lido. The command was a mixed Italian Army-Italian Navy formation under the command of a navy Counter admiral and assigned to the army's V Territorial Military Command for training and operational use and dependent to the navy's Upper Adriatic Autonomous Maritime Military Command for the disciplinary issues. The command was tasked with the defense of the coastal lagoons in the northern Adriatic Sea: the Venetian Lagoon, the Marano Lagoon, and the Grado Lagoon. On 1 July 1951, the command formed a command platoon, which included navy and army personnel. On 30 August of the same year, the Coastal Lagoon Battalion "Marghera" was formed in Malcontenta. The battalion consisted of a command company with personnel from the army and navy, a truck-transported company with army personnel, an amphibious company with navy personnel. On 15 October 1951, the Italian Navy's Battalion "San Marco" in Villa Vicentina, which was manned by navy personnel and organized as an army infantry battalion, was assigned, in regards to training and disciplinary issues, to the Lagoonal Forces Sector Command, while the Infantry Division "Folgore" retained operational control of the battalion. On 1 December 1951, the Lagoonal Forces Sector Command and the Coastal Lagoon Battalion "Marghera" reached full operational capability.

On 1 December 1952, the Upper Adriatic Autonomous Maritime Military transferred its disciplinary oversight of the Lagoonal Forces Sector Command to V Territorial Military Command. On 15 July 1952, the Coastal Lagoon Battalion "Marghera" formed the Lagoonal Support Unit. On 1 September 1952, the Coastal Lagoon Battalion "Piave" was formed in Mestre with the same organization as the "Marghera" battalion. On 1 January 1953, the Lagoonal Forces Sector Command was transferred from the V Territorial Military Command to the V Army Corps.

On 1 January 1954, the landing crafts and boats of the Lagoonal Forces Sector Command were merged into the Landing Craft Group, which, on 15 January 1956, was renamed Naval Vehicles Group. On 1 March 1956, the command of the Lagoonal Forces Sector was assigned to a colonel of the Italian Army and the process of detaching the navy component began. On 1 July 1957, the Battalion "San Marco" was renamed Coastal Lagoon Battalion "Isonzo" and its navy personnel and materiel replaced by army personnel and materiel. By 1 September 1957, the Lagoonal Forces Sector Command, which now consisted almost entirely of army personnel, was renamed Lagoonal Grouping (Italian: Raggruppamento Lagunare). On 1 February 1958, the grouping formed the Motorized Battalion "Adria", which consisted of one active truck-transported company and two reserve truck-transported companies. On 1 May 1958, the lagoonal support units of the "Marghera", "Piave", and "Isonzo" battalions were merged into a single Lagoonal Support Unit. Afterwards the Lagoonal Grouping consisted of the following units:

- Lagoonal Grouping, in Venice Lido
  - Command Company
  - Amphibious Battalion "Marghera", in Malcontenta
  - Amphibious Battalion "Piave", in Mestre
  - Amphibious Battalion "Isonzo", in Villa Vicentina
  - Lagoonal Support Unit, in Mestre
  - Motorized Battalion "Adria", in Mestre
  - Signal Company
  - Training Company
  - Light Aircraft Section
  - Naval Vehicles Group (with Italian Navy personnel and materiel)
  - Light Maintenance Workshop

On 25 October 1959, the Lagoonal Grouping received its flag in a ceremony on Piazza San Marco in Venice. In 1963, the grouping's three amphibious battalions were mechanized and equipped with M113 armored personnel carriers. In 1964, the Lagoonal Support Unit was equipped with M4 Sherman tanks and renamed XXII Tank Battalion. On 24 May 1964, the Lagoonal Grouping was elevated to regiment and renamed Lagunari Regiment "Serenissima". The regiment was assigned the traditions of the Venetian Fanti da Mar and the Royal Italian Army's Lagunari. At the same time the regiment's Naval Vehicles Group was disbanded. In October 1964, the XXII Tank Battalion moved from Mestre to San Vito al Tagliamento, while the amphibious battalion's watercraft platoons and amphibious vehicles platoons were merged and formed the Amphibious Transports Company. Afterwards the regiment consisted of the following units:

- Lagunari Regiment "Serenissima", in Venice Lido
  - Command Company
  - Amphibious Battalion "Marghera", in Malcontenta
  - Amphibious Battalion "Piave", in Mestre
  - Amphibious Battalion "Isonzo", in Villa Vicentina
  - XXII Tank Battalion, in San Vito al Tagliamento (initially equipped with M4 Sherman tanks, which were then replaced by M47 Patton tanks)
  - Amphibious Transports Company, on Sant'Andrea island and in Cà Vio
  - Signal Company

During the 1975 army reform the army disbanded the regimental level and newly independent battalions were granted for the first time their own flags. On 1 September 1975, the Amphibious Battalion "Marghera" in Malcontenta was disbanded. On 19 October 1975, the Lagunari Regiment "Serenissima" was disbanded. The next day the personnel of the regiment's command formed the Amphibious Troops Command and the regiment's remaining battalions became autonomous units. On the same day, 20 October 1975, the Amphibious Battalion "Isonzo" was renamed 41st Mechanized Infantry Battalion "Modena", while the XXII Tank Battalion was renamed 22nd Tank Battalion "M.O. Piccinini". The two battalions were assigned to the Mechanized Brigade "Gorizia", when that brigade was activated on 1 November 1975. Furthermore on the same day, the Amphibious Battalion "Piave" was renamed 1st Lagunari Battalion "Serenissima", the Lagunari regiment's Command Company and Signal Company merged to form the Command and Signal Company of the Amphibious Troops Command, and the Amphibious Transports Company was reorganized as Amphibious Vehicles Battalion "Sile".

After its formation the Amphibious Troops Command was assigned to the Mechanized Division "Folgore". The 1st Lagunari Battalion "Serenissima" consisted of a command, a command and services company, three mechanized companies with M113 armored personnel carriers, and a heavy mortar company with M106 mortar carriers with 120mm Mod. 63 mortars. At the time the battalion fielded 896 men (45 officers, 100 non-commissioned officers, and 751 soldiers).

On 25 October 1975, the 1st Lagunari Battalion "Serenissima" received the flag of the Lagunari Regiment "Serenissima" in a ceremony on Piazza San Marco in Venice. On 12 November 1976, the President of the Italian Republic Giovanni Leone assigned with decree 846 the flag and traditions of the Lagunari Regiment "Serenissima" and the traditions of the Fanti di Mar to the 1st Lagunari Battalion "Serenissima".

On 25 June 1984, the Lagunari became a speciality within the Italian Army's infantry arm and, on 26 August 1984, the Italian Armed Forces' Military Vicar Gaetano Bonicelli assigned Saint Mark the Evangelist as patron saint of the new speciality.

On 31 October 1986, the Mechanized Division "Folgore" was disbanded and the next day the Amphibious Troops Command was assigned to the 5th Army Corps.

=== Recent times ===
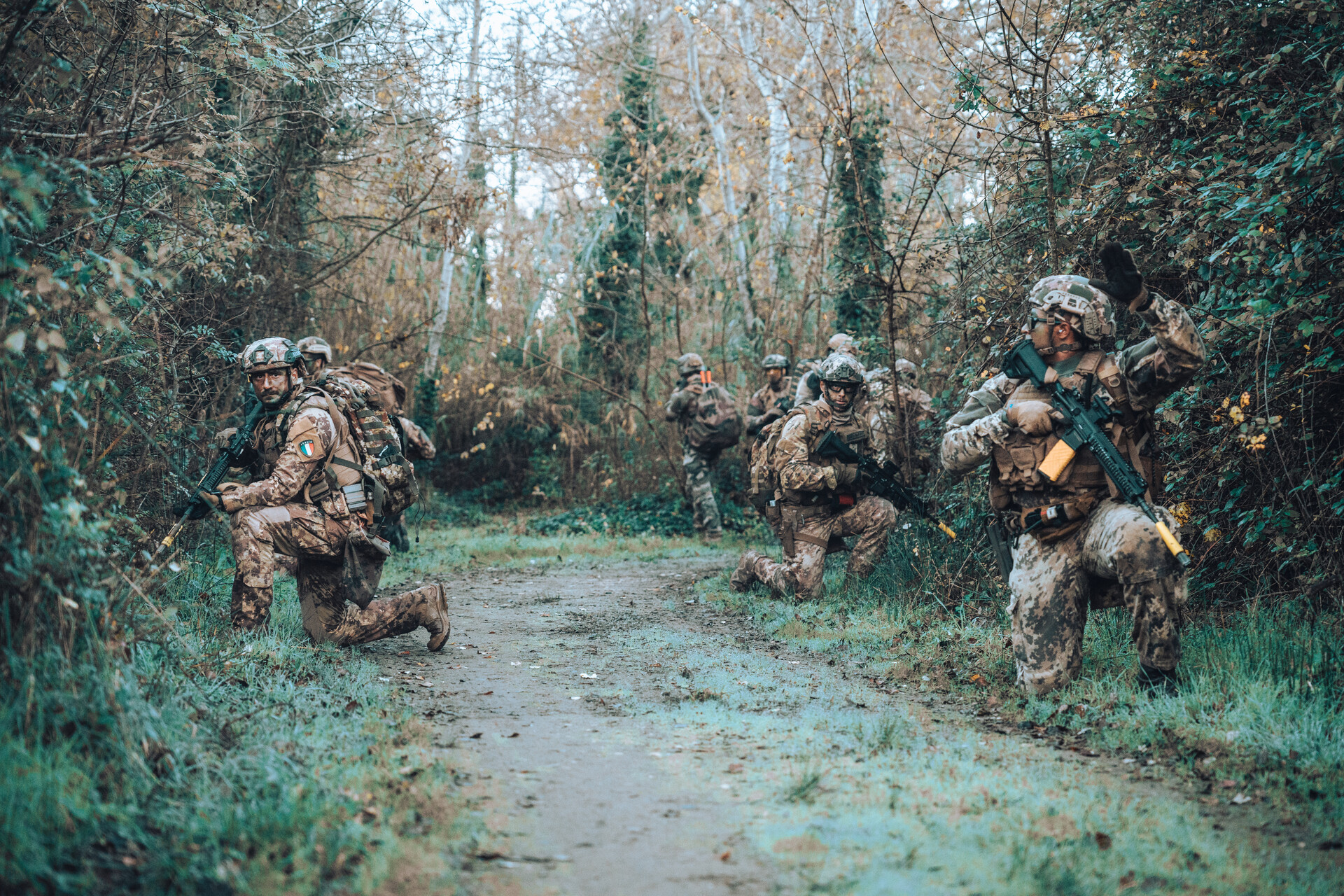
Lagunari Regiment "Serenissima" and French Army 21^{e} Régiment d'Infanterie de Marine troops during an exercise in France

On 13 October 1992, the 1st Lagunari Battalion "Serenissima" lost its autonomy and the next day the battalion entered the reformed Lagunari Regiment "Serenissima" as 1st Lagunari Battalion. The reformed regiment also incorporated the Nautical Vehicles Company of the disbanded Amphibious Battalion "Sile". Afterwards the regiment consisted of a command, a command and services company, a nautical vehicles company, and the 1st Lagunari Battalion. On 16 September 1996, the regiment was transferred from the 5th Army Corps to the Support Units Command "Legnano". On 31 December 1997, the Support Units Command "Legnano" was disbanded and regiment was transferred to the Projection Forces Command. On 1 December 2000, the Lagunari Regiment "Serenissima" joined the Cavalry Brigade "Pozzuolo del Friuli". The regiment repeatedly deployed to Bosnia and Herzegovina and Kosovo as part of NATO's peacekeeping missions. For its conduct in the Balkans the regiment was awarded a Silver Medal of Army Valor, which was affixed to the regiment's flag and added to the regiment's coat of arms.

In 2004, the Lagunari Regiment "Serenissima" deployed to Iraq as part of the Multi-National Force – Iraq. On 5 and 6 August 2004, forces of Muqtada al-Sadr's Mahdi Army fought units of the Cavalry Brigade "Pozzuolo del Friuli" for control of the three main bridges over the Euphrates river in Nasiriyah. The Lagunari Regiment "Serenissima", together with troops of the 3rd Engineer Regiment, defeated the insurgents' attacks. For its conduct in the two day battle the regiment was awarded a Gold Medal of Army Valor, which was affixed to the regiment's flag and added to the regiment's coat of arms. From 9 November 2006 to 13 April 2007, the regiment deployed to Lebanon as part of the UN's United Nations Interim Force in Lebanon. For its service in Lebanon the regiment was awarded a Silver Cross of Army Merit, which was affixed to the regiment's flag.

In 2007, the Lagunari Regiment "Serenissima" and the navy's Regiment "San Marco" became part of the Italian Armed Forces' Sea Projection Force. In 2010-11, the regiment deployed to Farah in Afghanistan as part of NATO's International Security Assistance Force. In 2011, the regiment replaced the infantry's black beret with a "lagoon green"-colored beret. In 2019, the regiment deployed to Herat in Afghanistan as part of NATO's Resolute Support Mission. For its conduct in Afghanistan the regiment was awarded a Military Order of Italy, which was affixed to the regiment's flag and added to the regiment's coat of arms. For its conduct and work during the COVID-19 pandemic the regiment was awarded in 2022 a Silver Cross of Army Merit, which was affixed to the regiment's flag.

== Organization ==
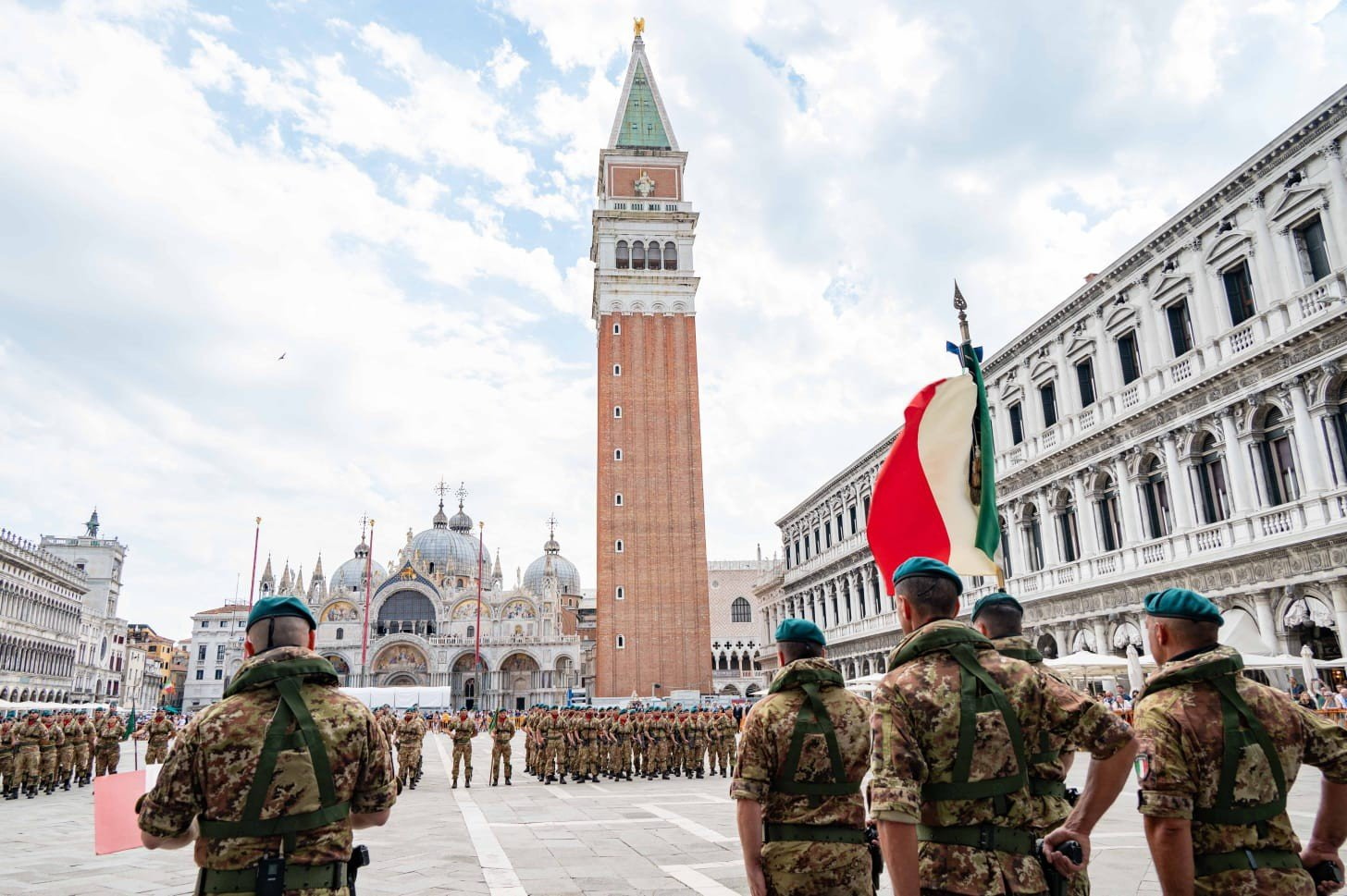
Lagunari Regiment "Serenissima" on parade on Piazza San Marco in Venice for the 40th anniversary of the Lagunari speciality

As of 2025 the Lagunari Regiment "Serenissima" is organized as follows:

- Lagunari Regiment "Serenissima", in Mestre
  - Command and Logistic Support Company, in Mestre
  - Amphibious Tactical Support Company, on Sant'Andrea island
  - Training Company, in Mestre
  - 1st Lagunari Battalion, in Malcontenta
    - 1st Lagunari Company "Marghera"
    - 2nd Lagunari Company "Piave"
    - 3rd Lagunari Company "Isonzo"
    - Maneuver Support Company, in Mestre

The Command and Logistic Support Company consists of a command platoon, a medical platoon, a quartermaster platoon, and a transport and materiel platoon. The Amphibious Tactical Support Company consists of an Amphibious Reconnaissance Platoon, an Amphibious Vehicles Platoon, which is equipped with AAV7-A1 amphibious assault vehicles (which are slated to be replaced by 64 Amphibious Armored Vehicles), and a Watercraft Platoon, which operates the regiment's landing craft and speedboats. Each of the three Lagunari companies consists of three fusilier platoons, one maneuver support platoon, and a logistic squad. Each fusilier platoon consists of three fusilier squads and a maneuver support squad, with each fusilier squad fielding two fire teams of four Lagunari and a driver. Each fusilier squad is equipped with one Minimi machine gun, one ARX200 battle rifle, and two ARX160 assault rifles, one of which includes an underslung GLX160 grenade launcher. The fusilier platoons' maneuver support squads include the platoon's commander and deputy commander, two drivers, a radio operator, and a fire support squad, which is equipped with a Minimi machine gun, a Panzerfaust 3 anti-tank rocket launcher, and a M6C-210 60mm mortar. Each fusilier squad rides in two VTLM Lince vehicles. The Lagunari companies' maneuver support platoons consist of a command team, a surveillance and target acquisition team, a fire direction squad, three mortar squads, equipped with MX2 81mm mortars, and two anti-tank squads with Spike MR anti-tank guided missiles. The 1st Lagunari Battalion's Maneuver Support Company fields a heavy mortar platoon, an anti-tank platoon, and a sniper squad. The Heavy Mortar Platoon consists of four mortar squads, each of which is equipped with a MO-120 RT 120mm mortar. The Anti-tank Platoon consists of four anti-tank squads equipped with Spike LR anti-tank guided missiles. The Sniper Squad, consists of three sniper teams, which field one sniper, one spotter, and a driver.

== See also ==
- Italian Navy: San Marco Marine Brigade
