= Bassa Friulana =

Coordinates: 45°43′28″N 13°4′18″E

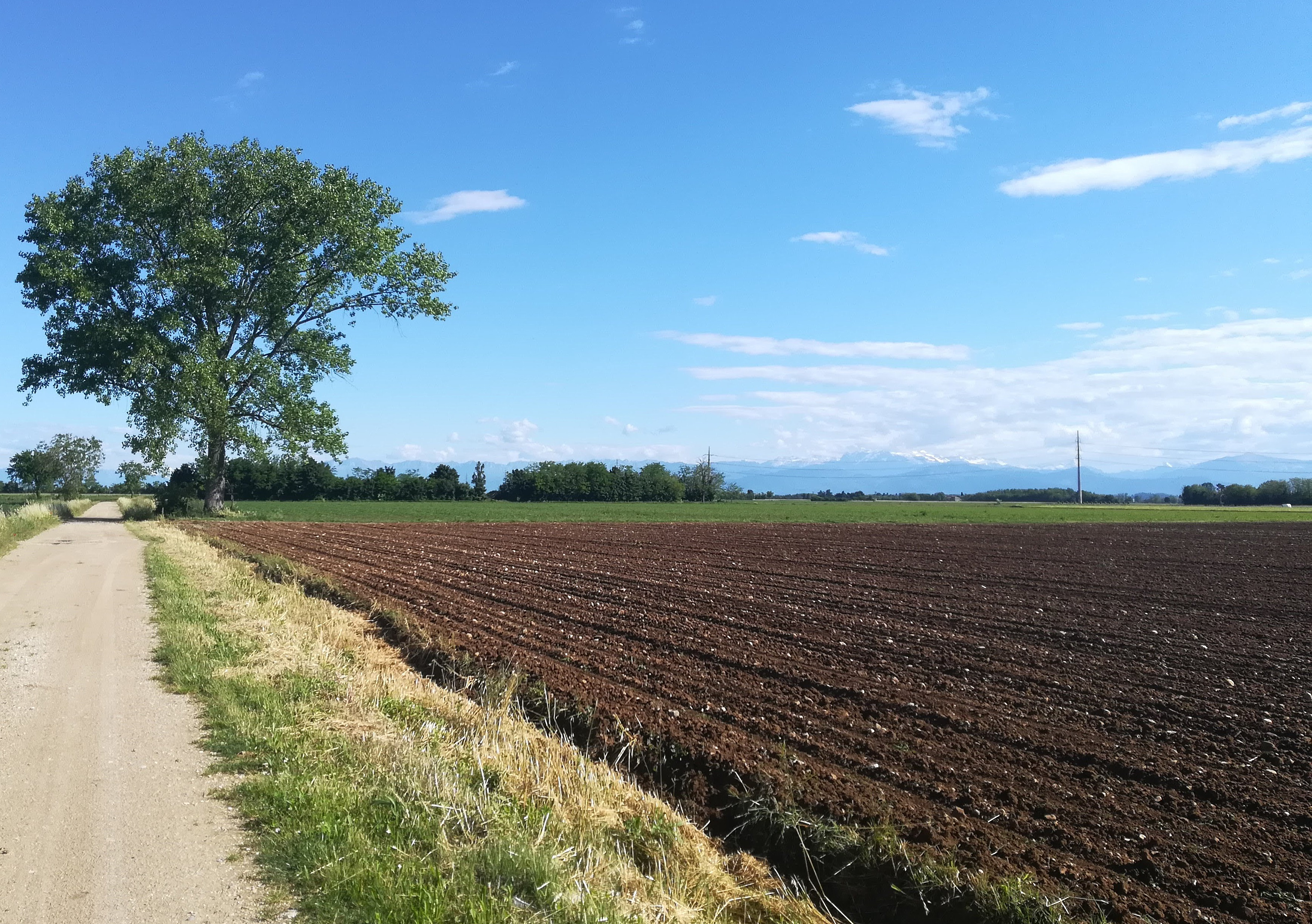
Image of the plain.

The Bassa Friulana is a low-lying and level area of Friuli, specifically the very southern part of the provinces of Pordenone, Udine and Gorizia in the north-eastern Italian region of Friuli-Venezia Giulia.

It is well known for its beaches (such as those of Grado, Grado Pineta, Lignano Sabbiadoro, Lignano Pineta and Lignano Riviera), and for its lagoons (such as those of Grado and Marano Lagunare). There is a unique example of industrial archaeology at Torviscosa. Palmanova is a small Renaissance town shaped as a star. Monfalcone has important shipyards.

The Roman and medieval town of Aquileia is of great historical importance. In both Roman and present times, the Bassa Friulana was a highly productive farmland, but during the twelve centuries between the two periods, this land was depopulated.
