= Lignano (disambiguation) =

Lignano Sabbiadoro is a town and comune in Udine, Friuli-Venezia Giulia, Italy.

Lignano may also refer to:

- Lignano Pineta, a frazione of Lignano Sabbiadoro
- Lignano Riviera, a frazione of Lignano Sabbiadoro
- Ferdinando Lignano (born 1948), Italian water polo player
- Giuseppe Lignano (born 1963), Italian architect
- Macrostomum lignano, the free living flatworm
