= Masters W85 400 metres world record progression =

This is the progression of world record improvements of the 400 metres W85 division of Masters athletics.

Key

Incomplete information Pending

Hand	Auto	Athlete	Nationality	Birthdate	Age	Location	Date	Ref
	1:37.34	Kathleen Stewart	Great Britain	7 August 1939	85 years, 318 days	Jarrow	21 June 2025	
	1:41.63	Emiko Saito	Japan	13 March 1931	86 years, 47 days	Chiba	29 April 2017	
	1:49.46	Nina Naumenko	Russia	15 June 1925	86 years, 93 days	Lignano	16 September 2011	
	2:07.79	Patricia Peterson	United States	14 April 1926	85 years, 83 days	Sacramento	6 July 2011	
	2:11.31	Josephine Gregg	United States	1912		Tucson	1997	
2:11.2 h		Matsue Nishiyama	Japan	7 March 1907		Kyoto	1992	
