= Claudio Granzotto =

Italian sculptor (1900–1947)

Blessed Claudio Granzotto O.F.M.
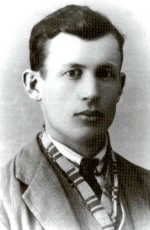
- Granzotto in c. 1920.

Religious
- Born: 23 August 1900; Santa Lucia di Piave, Treviso, Kingdom of Italy
- Died: 15 August 1947 (aged 46); Padua, Italy
- Venerated in: Roman Catholic Church
- Beatified: 20 November 1994, Saint Peter's Basilica, Vatican City by Pope John Paul II
- Feast: 15 August
- Attributes: Franciscan habit
- Patronage: Sculptors; Artists

Claudio Granzotto (23 August 1900 – 15 August 1947, born Riccardo Granzotto) was an Italian professed religious from the Order of Friars Minor and a noted sculptor. Granzotto's works were a conduit for his religious expression and are reflective of his dedication to use sculpting to evangelize to others.

The fame for his personal holiness prompted the commencement for the sainthood process which opened under Pope John Paul I on 22 September 1978 before Pope John Paul II named him as Venerable on 7 September 1989 and later beatified him on 20 November 1994.

== Biography ==
Riccardo Granzotto was born on 23 August 1900 in the commune of Santa Lucia di Piave in the Province of Treviso as the last of nine children to Antonio Granzotto and Giovanna Scottò. The infant was baptized on 2 September in the names of "Riccardo Vittorio". His older brother Giovanni worked as a tradesman.

His parents were peasants who required his help in working in the fields in his childhood in order for them to survive and this increased all the more after the death of his father in 1909. His poor parents were devout and instilled into their children a strong knowledge of their faith. The outbreak of World War I soon saw him drafted into the Italian armed forces in 1915 where he served until 1918 when the war concluded.

Once he was discharged from service he was able to commence his studies and developed his talents as an artist with a particular liking for sculpture. He enrolled in the Accademia di Belle Arti di Venezia in Venice and graduated there with honors in 1929; he entered at the encouragement of his older brother Giovanni and his parish priest Vittorio Morando. One of the major themes of his works was religious art. He soon felt a religious vocation after meeting the Franciscan priest Amadio Oliviero in 1932 (the two became good friends) and decided to become a professed religious – he later entered the Order of Friars Minor on 7 December 1933. In his letter of recommendation his pastor wrote to the friars that "the order is receiving not only an artist but a saint". His novitiate commenced in 1935 and he assumed the religious name of "Claudio" while later making his religious vows in 1936 and being sent to the convent of San Francesco in Vittorio Veneto. In 1930 he won a competition to have a statue he made put up but this turned into a failure as he was denied this because he did not support nor would he want to support fascism.

Granzotto chose not to pursue ordination and lived his life as a professed religious at the Franciscan convent of Santa Maria della Pieve in Padua. He dedicated his life to contemplation on the Gospel as well as to the service of the poor and his art through which he hoped to express his faith. Most of his works are depictions of Jesus Christ and the saints. One example of it can be found in the parish church of his hometown which is a sculpted figure of the Devil which supports the baptismal font of the parish; its pastor commissioned this particular work. Another version was later sculpted for the ancient shrine of the Madonna in the care of the Franciscan friars on the island of Barbana. He spent his time performing his duties while continuing to pursue his passion for sculpture. He would often spend whole nights in silent meditation before the Blessed Sacrament for which he fostered an ardent devotion.

In 1945, Granzotto developed a brain tumor which resulted in his death not too long later. He embraced the sufferings he endured from this disorder as an imitation of the Passion of Christ and died on the Feast of the Assumption on 15 August. His remains were buried in Chiampo.

== Beatification ==
The beatification process commenced in the Diocese of Vittorio Veneto in an informative process that Bishop Albino Luciani - the future Pope John Paul I - inaugurated on 16 December 1959 and later closed on 6 March 1961 while theologians later collated his writings in order to examine them if such writings were in line with doctrine. The decree for the approval of his writings was issued on 30 March 1967. Granzotto became titled as a Servant of God under John Paul I on 22 September 1978 with the formal commencement of the cause; Bishop Antonio Cunial oversaw the apostolic process that was held from 20 April 1980 until 8 December 1981 at which point the Congregation for the Causes of Saints validated both diocesan processes on 7 January 1983 in Rome.

The submission of the Positio to the C.C.S. in 1986 meant that theologians could meet and approve the contents of the dossier in their meeting on 9 February 1988 while the C.C.S. met later on 6 June 1989 and also approved the cause. Granzotto became titled as Venerable on 7 September 1989 after Pope John Paul II confirmed that the late religious had lived a life of heroic virtue. The process for investigating a miracle occurred in the place it originated in and later received C.C.S. validation on 19 September 1986 before receiving the approval of a medical board on 1 April 1992. Theologians approved it on 9 October 1992 as did the C.C.S. on 22 June 1993 before John Paul II granted the final approval needed for it on 6 July 1993. John Paul II beatified Granzotto on 20 November 1994 in Saint Peter's Basilica.

The sudden and inexplicable healing of a child suffering from peridacriocistitis was declared as the miracle attributed to his intercession. The liturgical feast was affixed for 2 September instead of the date of his death as is the norm. The current postulator for this cause is Giovangiuseppe Califano.
