= Barbana, Italy =

Island of Italy

Coordinates: 45.7032°N 13.4230°E

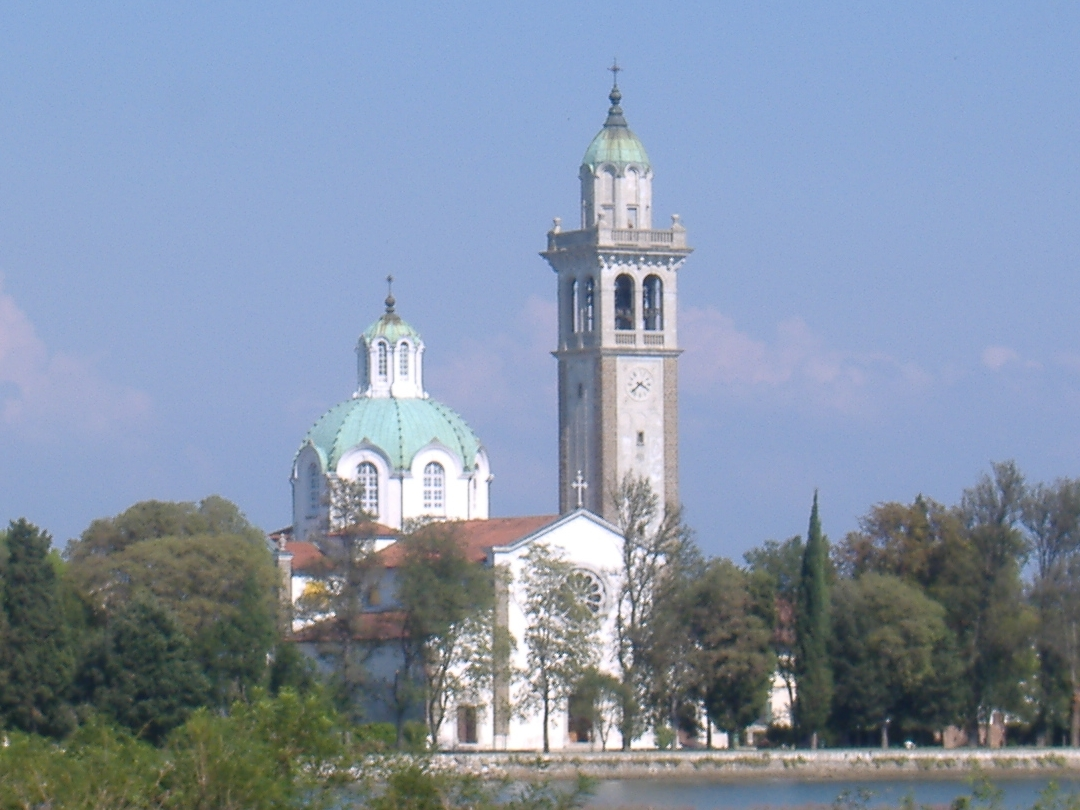
Barbana, the Marian sanctuary

Barbana is a small island located at the northern end of the Grado Lagoon, near Trieste in north-east Italy. It is the site of the Santuario di Barbana, an ancient Marian shrine, whose origins date back to 582 when Elia, the Patriarch of Aquileia, built a church near the hut of a hermit from Treviso named Barbanus. The island, which can be easily reached by ferry from nearby Grado, is populated by community of Benedictine friars.

== History of the shrine ==
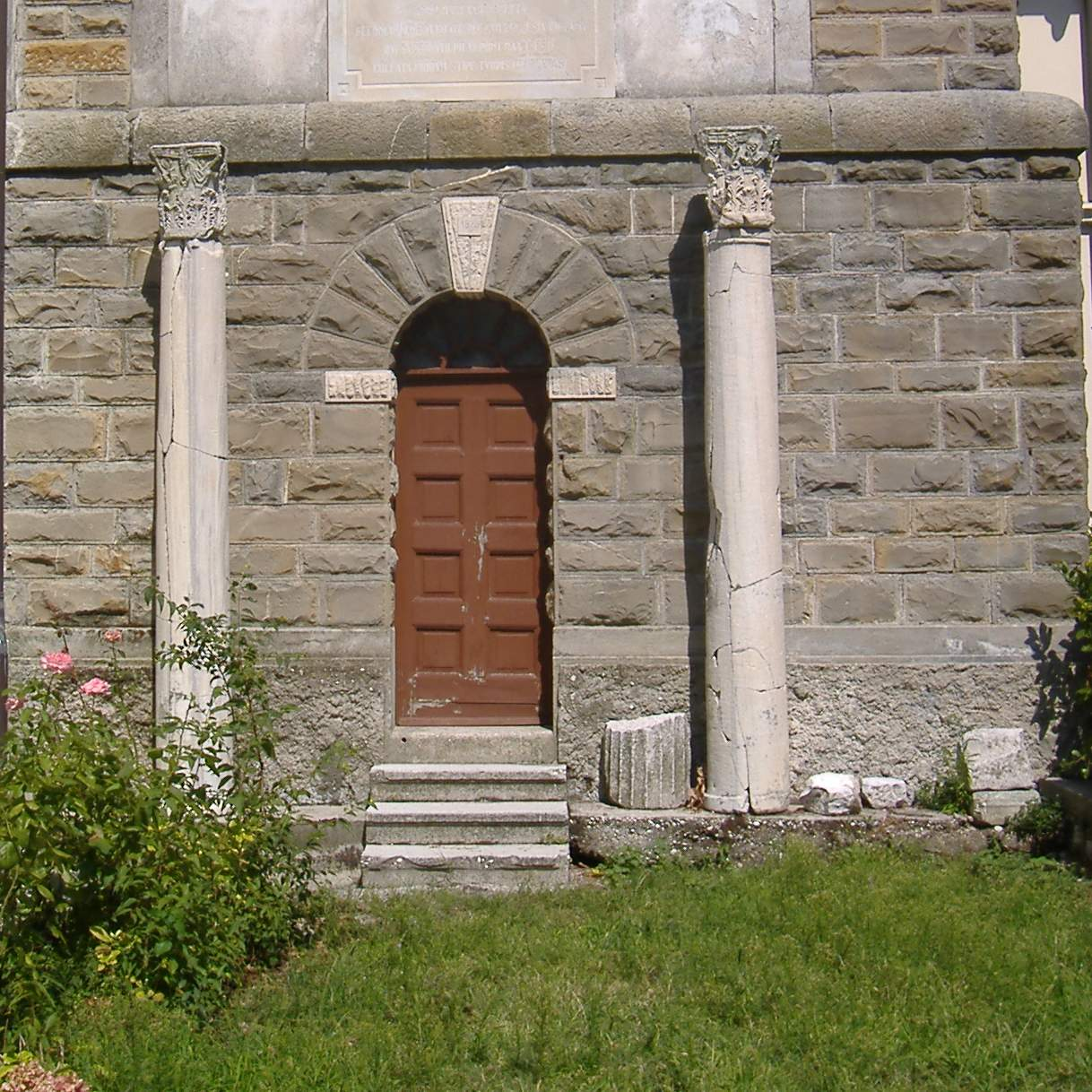
Columns from the original 6th-century church

The foundation of the shrine originates from an image of the Virgin Mary carried in by the sea and found at the foot of an elm after a fierce storm. At that time the site was part of the mainland; the Grado Lagoon was formed between the 5th and 7th centuries.

From the foundation to around 1000, Barbana became an island and the shrine was served by a community of monks unique to the island, called the Barbitani. The original church was destroyed by floods and rebuilt. The image of Mary, too, was lost and in the 11th century was replaced by a wooden statue known as the Madonna mora. This Black Madonna is now housed in the Domus Mariae (House of Mary), a chapel near the main church.

In the 11th century, the care of the shrine was entrusted to Benedictine monks, who served there until the 15th century. They were succeeded by a Franciscan community who built a new church in the 18th century.

Since 2020, the shrine has been entrusted to a Benedictine congregation of Brazilian foundation.

== Art and architecture ==
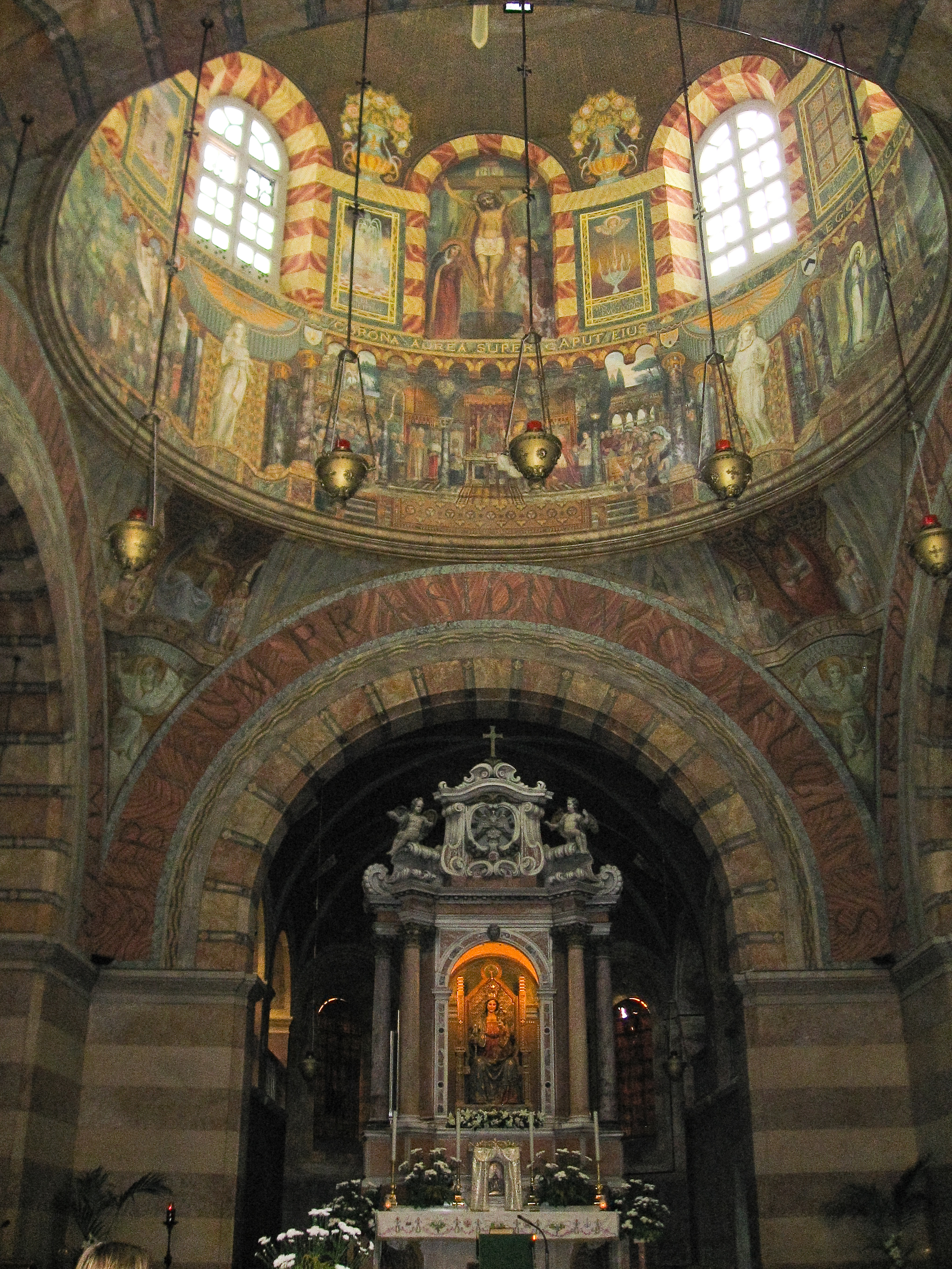
Interior of Barbana Church.

The modern church was built in the Romanesque style at the beginning of the 20th century. Ancient remains include two Roman columns from the first church, and a 10th-century relief portraying Jesus. The crowned statue of Mary dates from the 15th century, while the 17th century is represented by several altars and paintings, including one from the school of Tintoretto.

In the wood near the church a small chapel (the Cappella dell'apparizione) was built in 1854 in the place where the original image of Mary was found.

The baptismal font of the church is supported by a figure of the Devil, sculpted in red marble. It is the work of Claudio Granzotto, a Franciscan friar and noted religious artist of the mid-20th century. He has been beatified by the Catholic Church and is being considered for canonization.

== Pilgrimages ==
Barbana is the destination of many pilgrimages, the most famous being the Perdon de Barbana which is held each July to celebrate the end of a visitation of the plague in Grado in 1237.

== See also ==
- List of islands of Italy
- Grado
- Shrines to the Virgin Mary
