= Valle Cavanata Nature Reserve =

Protected area in Italy

- Riserva Naturale della Valle Cavanata
- IUCN category IV (habitat/species management area)
- Location within Italy
- Location: Grado, Italy
- Coordinates: 45.7103°N 13.4709°E
- Area: 327 ha (810 acres)
- Established: 1996

The Valle Cavanata Nature Reserve (Italian: Riserva Naturale della Valle Cavanata) is a 327-hectare (810-acre) protected area situated in the easternmost part of the Grado Lagoon in Grado, Italy.

== History ==
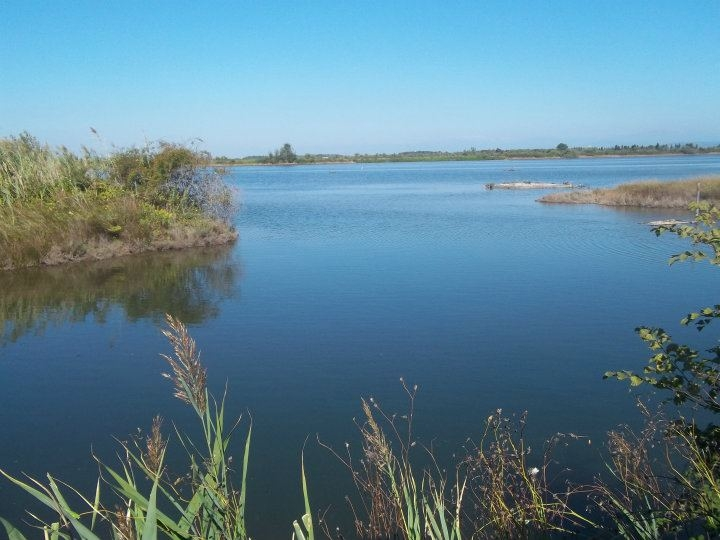
View of the lagoon

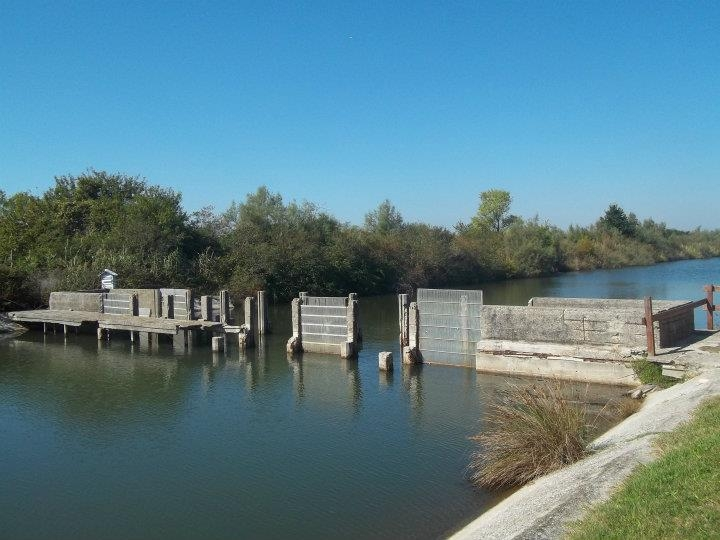
Sluice gates in Valle Cavanata

Valle Cavanata was historically a fish farming area created in the 1920s, in the eastern part of the lagoon of Grado, that was embanked and provided with adjustable floodgates and thus transformed into a brackish area for fish farming. The water level in Valle Cavanata can be modified by the sluice gates; they allow the water to flood the area at high tide or let it out at low tide.

The 'lavoriere' was used for fishing—a metallic grid where the fishes were trapped. An extensive type of fish rearing has always been practised in Valle Cavanata. The fish farming activities were maintained until 1995; after which, the management of the water levels in the Valle Cavanata has been oriented to favor the bird fauna especially.

The Valle Cavanata Regional Nature Reserve is under the management of the Authority for Parks and Regional Forests of the Autonomous Region of Friuli-Venezia Giulia. The presence of several environments between the sea and the mainland (lagoon, beach, wood, meadow, fishing valley, pond) makes it an ideal place for the permanent habitat of several species of birds, while others spend only the winter here. 260 bird species have been identified. Valle Cavanata Reserve has been declared a wetland of international value by the Ramsar Convention, it is a Site of Community Importance (SCI) and a Special Protection Area (SPA).
