= Grado, Friuli Venezia Giulia =

Grado
- Comune
- Comune di Grado
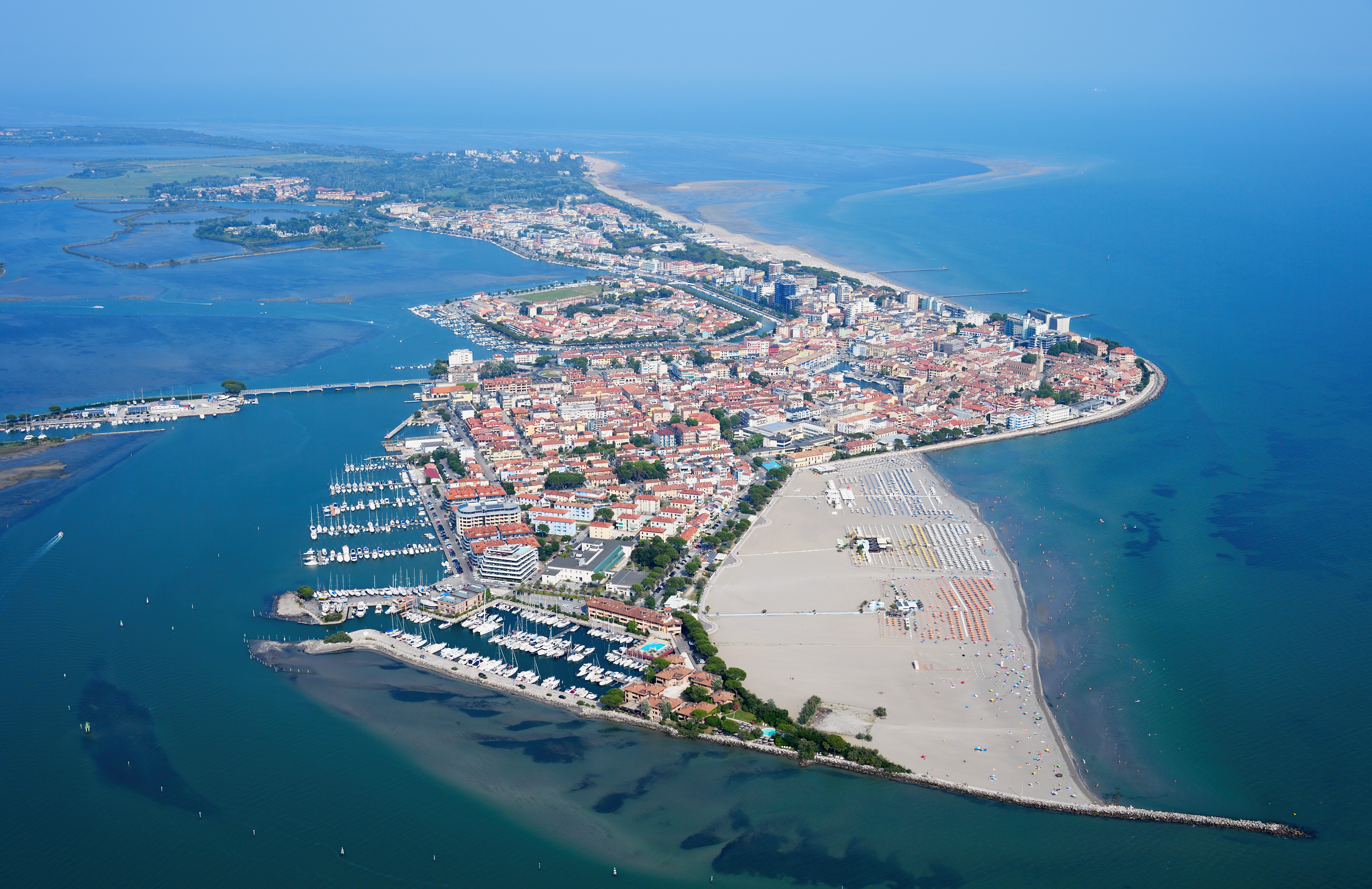

- Coat of arms

- Location within Italy Location within Friuli-Venezia Giulia
- Coordinates: 45°40′40″N 13°23′41″E
- Country: Italy
- Region: Friuli-Venezia Giulia
- Province: Gorizia (GO)
- Frazioni: Boscat, Fossalon, Pineta, Primero, Val Cavarera

Government
  - Mayor: Claudio Kovatsch

Area
  - Total: 114 km^{2} (44 sq mi)
- Elevation: 2 m (6.6 ft)

Population (31-12-2019)
  - Total: 8,064
  - Density: 70.7/km^{2} (183/sq mi)
- Demonym: Gradesi
- Time zone: UTC+1 (CET)
  - Summer (DST): UTC+2 (CEST)
- Postal code: 34073
- Dialing code: 0431
- ISTAT code: 031009
- Patron saint: St. Hermagoras and Fortunatus
- Saint day: July 12
- Website: Official website

Grado (Venetian: Gravo; Friulian: Grau; Slovene: Gradež; Latin: Gradus) is a town and comune (municipality) of 8,064 residents in the Regional decentralization entity of Gorizia in the north-eastern Italian region of Friuli-Venezia Giulia, located on an island and adjacent peninsula of the Adriatic Sea between Venice and Trieste.

The territory of the municipality of Grado extends between the mouth of the Isonzo and the Adriatic Sea and the Grado Lagoon, and covers an area of about 90 square kilometers between Porto Buso and Fossalon. Characteristic of the lagoon is the presence of the casoni, which are simple houses with thatched roofs used in the past by the fishermen of Grado, who remained in the lagoon for a long time, returning to the island of Grado only during the colder period of the year.

Once mainly a fishing centre, today it is a popular tourist destination, known commonly as L'Isola del Sole ("The Island of the Sun"). It is also famous because it is a spa town; from 1873 a maritime hospice for children called Ospizio Marino wanted by the doctor Giuseppe Barellai was established on the island, because the climate and the environment of the island are a good place for the treatment of some childhood diseases. Subsequently, Grado was the chosen destination for marine thermal treatments, especially by the Austrian population. Together with Marano Lagunare, it is the centre of the Marano-Grado Lagoon, which is famous for its uncontaminated nature.

Grado is the birthplace of Biagio Marin, a poet who sang about the island in the local Venetian dialect.

== History ==
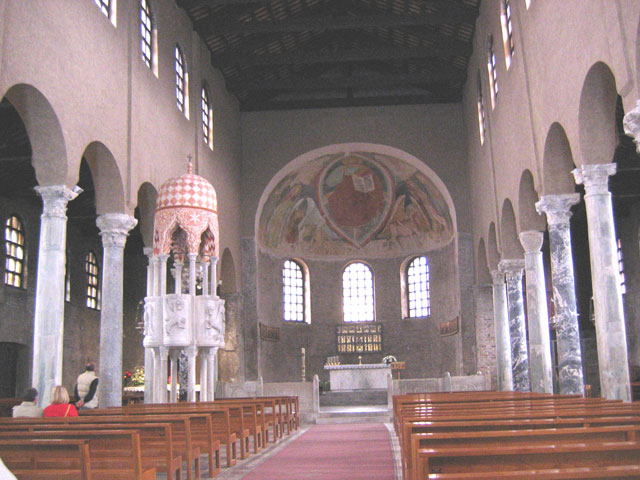
Interior of the Basilica of Sant'Eufemia, Grado

In Roman times the city, known as ad Aquae Gradatae, was the first port for ships entering the Natissa (Natisone), headed upstream to Aquileia.

During the late years of the Western Roman Empire many people fled from Aquileia to Grado in order to find a safer place, more protected from the invasions coming from the east.

In 452, Nicetas, Bishop of Aquileia, took refuge briefly at Grado; of the same period is the earliest construction of Grado's first cathedral, the first church of Santa Maria delle Grazie, and the baptistery. Grado was the home base of the patriarchate's fleet.

In 568, after the invasion of the Lombards who captured neighboring Aquileia, metropolitan Paulinus I of Aquileia found refuge in Grado that remained under Byzantine rule. Since Aquileia remained in Lombard hands, Grado became permanent residence of Aquileian metropolitans-patriarchs, and the transfer of Aquileian see to Grado was formalized in 579. Thus Grado became also known as the New Aquileia. At the beginning of the 7th century, a rival patriarch was elected in the old Aquileia, and since that time two lines of Aquileian patriarchs continued throughout the middle ages, one in New Aquileia (Grado) with jurisdiction over the Byzantine-controlled coastal regions (including the Venetian Lagoon), and the other in old Aquileia (later moved to Cormons, and then to Cividale), with jurisdiction over the Lombard-held interior.

A long-lasting dispute over the authority of the two patriarchs ensued. In 993, the patriarch Popo of the old Aquileia conquered Grado but was unable to keep possession of it. The matter was settled only in 1027 when the pope confirmed jurisdiction of the See of new Aquileia over Grado and the Venetian province. The seat of the patriarchate was transferred from Grado to Venice in 1451 by Pope Nicholas V. Reduced to a minor hamlet, Grado was sacked by the English, who burned the city archives in 1810 and by the French in 1812.

Grado was acquired by Austria in 1815, to which it belonged until 1918 when it was ceded to Italy after its victory in World War I.

In the Belvedere area where the land is interrupted and gives way to the lagoon, it was possible to embark to reach the island of Grado. Subsequently, there was a tourist and urban development and in 1905 a road was built in the middle of the lagoon to connect the two parts of the territory. In 1936 Grado was definitively connected to the mainland through the construction of a swing bridge which put an end to the isolation of the island.

== Main sights ==
Today there are frequent finds of inscriptions, sarcophagi, marble sculpture and small bronzes that once furnished its villas. The remains of one of these villas have been excavated on the islet of Gorgo in the lagoon.

Modern landmarks include:

- The Basilica of Sant'Eufemia (Cathedral), with the octagonal Baptistry (late 5th century). The church was once preceded by a quadri-portico, one of the columns of which is now in the centre of the Patriarch's Square. The current appearance of the church dates from the reconstruction by Fra Elia (579), with a simple hut façade and a bell tower (15th century) on the right side, which is surmounted by a statue portraying St. Michael and known as the Anzolo (1462). The interior has a nave and two aisles. The main point of interest is the mosaic pavement from the 6th century, restored in 1946–48.
- The basilica of Santa Maria delle Grazie. Begun in the 4th to 5th centuries, it was renovated in the 6th century and restored in Baroque in 1640.
- The Barbana Sanctuary. It is located in a small island in the Grado Lagoon called Barbana, which can be reached in 25 minutes by motorboat, the service is offered by the boat "Nuova Cristina" from Riva Zaccaria Gregori, Grado. The original church was erected in 582 and was since rebuilt and enlarged. The current sanctuary was built in Neo-Romantic style and houses numerous vestiges of the buildings that have succeeded each other over the centuries, including two columns that probably date back to the original church. Inside there are very different works: the main altar has a relief with the lagoon surmounted by a wooden statue guarded by an aedicule of the Madonna, a large canvas representing the union of Venetians in a brotherhood, two Venetian altars dedicated to St. Anthony of Padua (on the right) and St. Francis of Assisi (on the left). Furthermore, near the entrance to the bell tower, it is possible to see capitals and marble from the early Middle Ages.

Of the ancient fortress only a tower, turned into a private residence, and parts of the walls can still be seen. Under the Town Hall are remains of the Palaeo-Christian basilica of Piazza Vittoria.

The Valle Cavanata Nature Reserve is a 327-hectare (810-acre) protected area situated in the easternmost part of the Grado Lagoon.

== Resort town ==
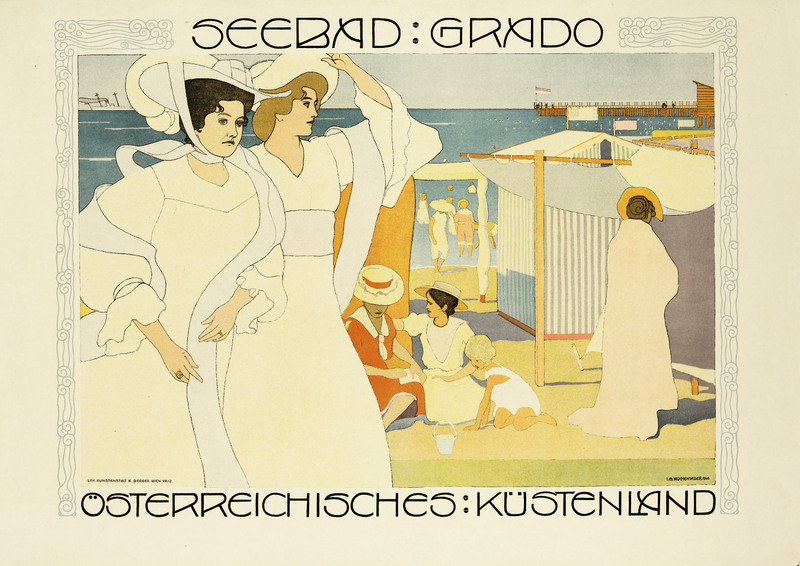
Josef Maria Auchentaller's famous 1906 Art Nouveau advertisement poster Seebad Grado

Today, Grado attracts scores of tourists each year to its hotels and campgrounds. The main attractions are its two large and sandy beaches, as well as its well-preserved pedestrian-only centre, in which many shops, bars, and restaurants are located.

Grado also offers facilities for many sporting activities, including tennis, wind-surfing, and golf. Excursions by boat to the Grado Lagoon are available, where one can visit the many dozen islands inside it (like Barbana).

== Twin towns ==
- Sankt Lorenzen bei Knittelfeld, Austria
- Sankt Marein-Feistritz, Austria

== Image gallery ==
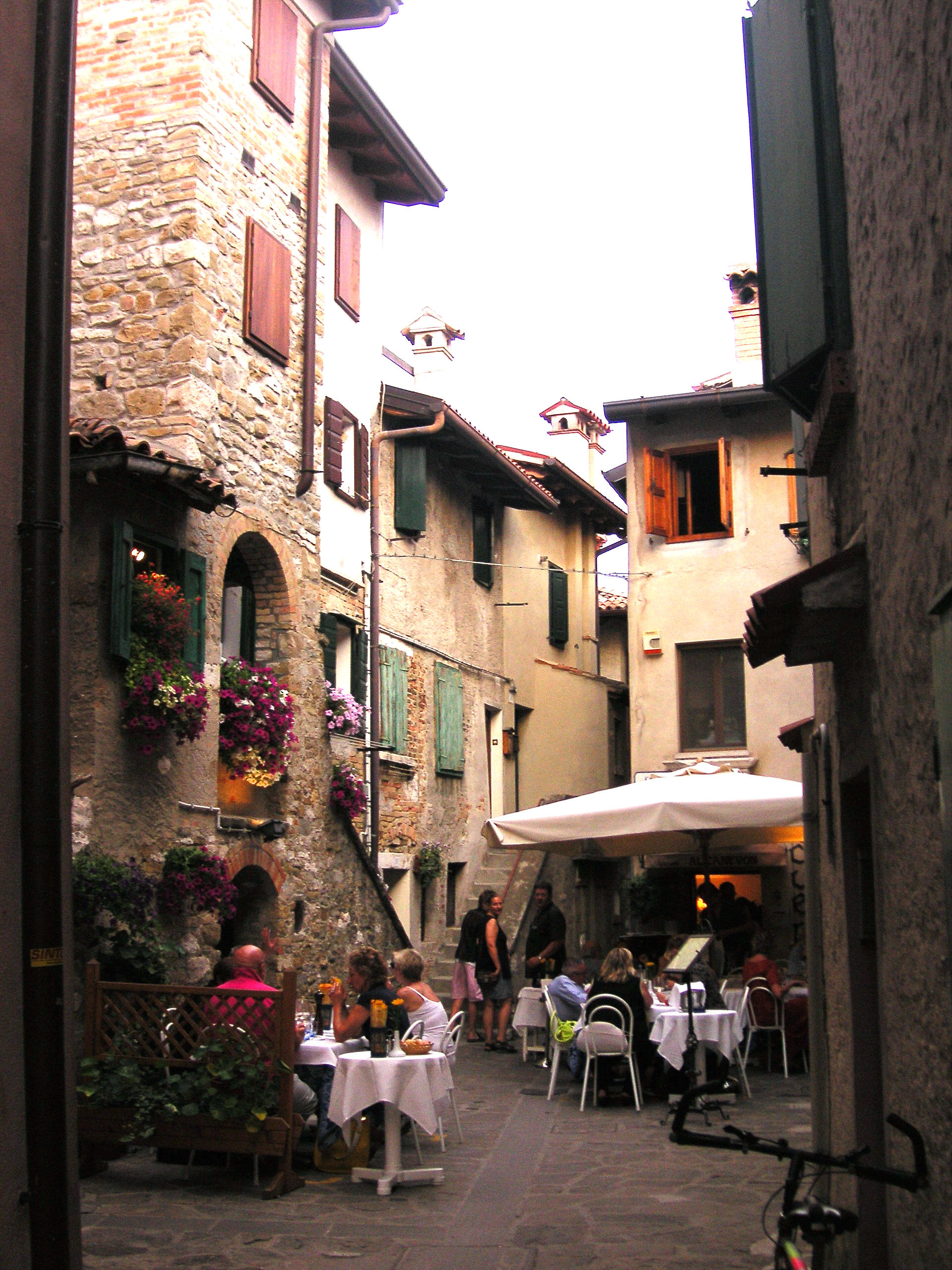
Many restaurants can be found in the oldest part of the town.

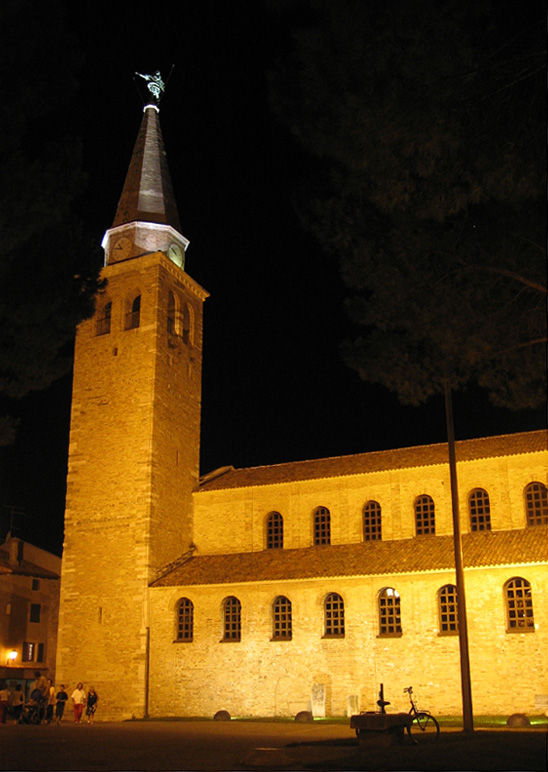
Basilica di Sant'Eufemia by night

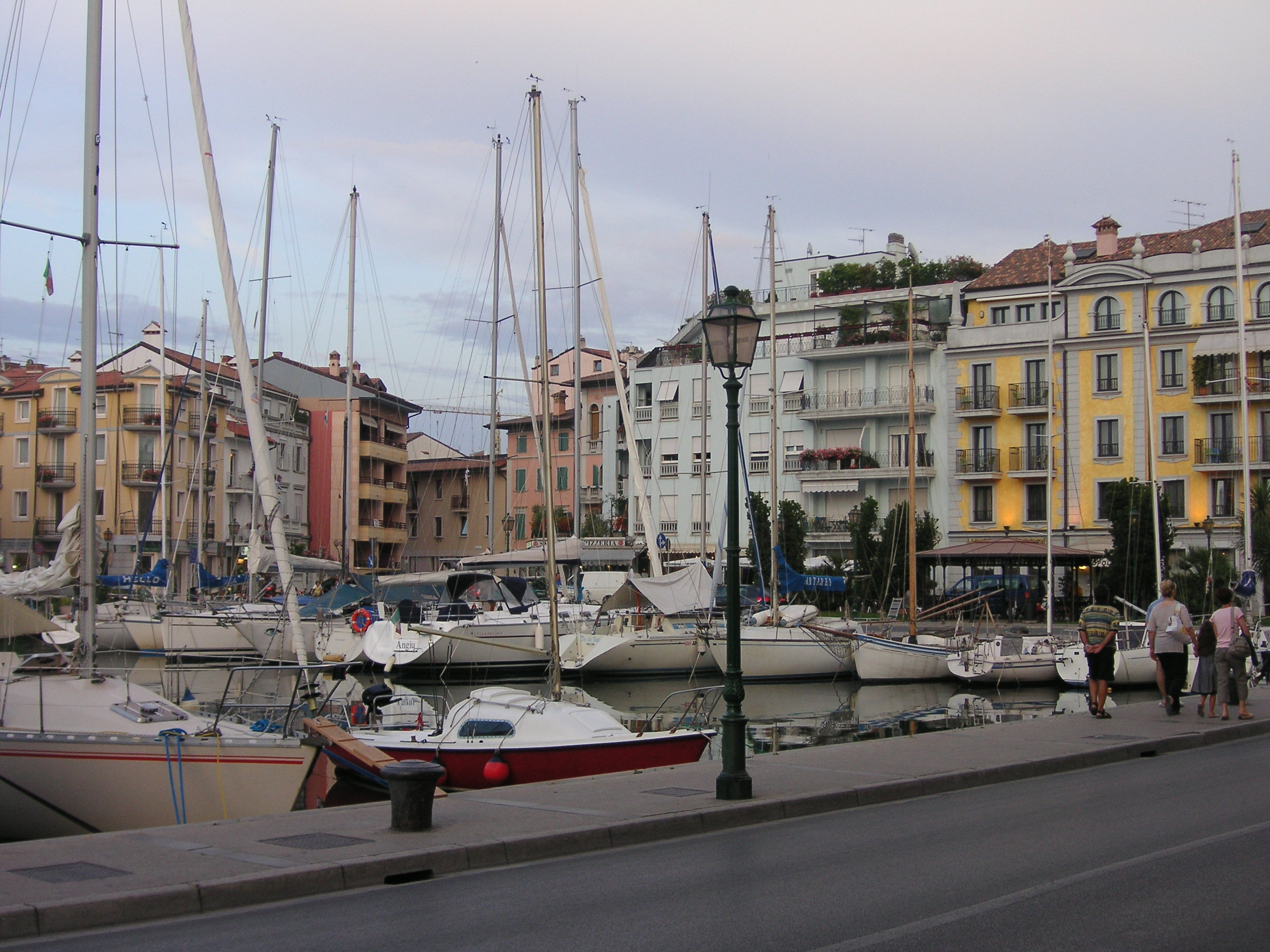
The harbour

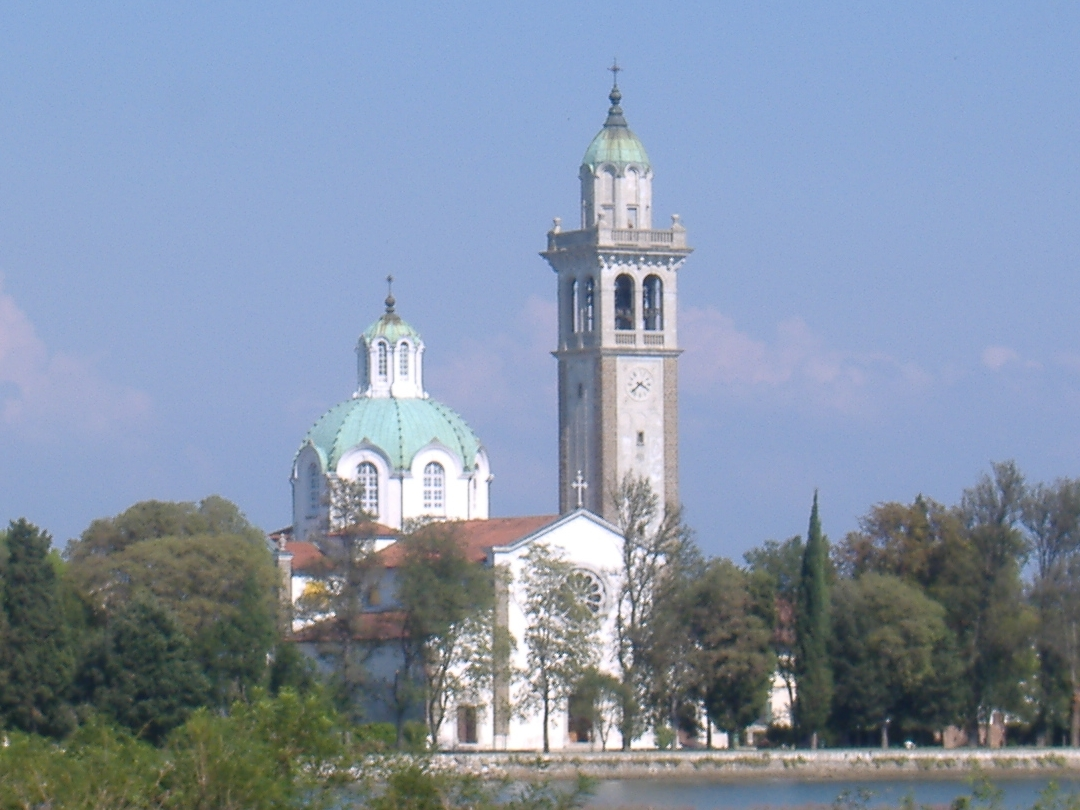
Barbana island, the Marian sanctuary

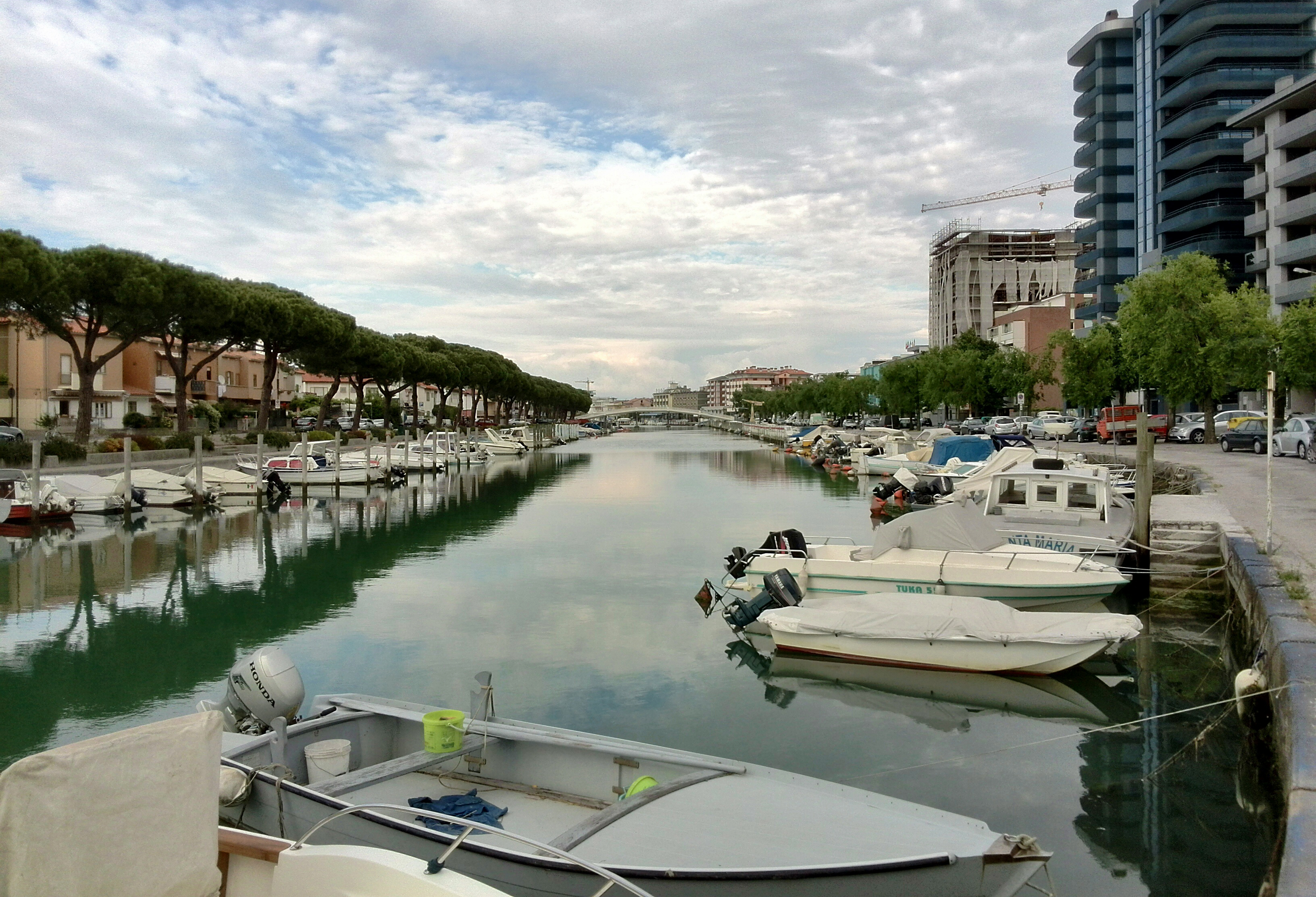
Channel in Grado

== See also ==
- List of islands of Italy
- Battle of Grado

== Bibliography ==
- Krahwinkler, Harald (2005). "Patriarch Fortunatus of Grado and the Placitum of Riziano" (PDF). Acta Histriae. 13 (1): 63–78.
- Meyendorff, John (1989). Imperial Unity and Christian Divisions: The Church 450-680 A.D. Crestwood, New York: St. Vladimir's Seminary Press.
- Nicovich, John Mark (2009). "The poverty of the Patriarchate of Grado and the Byzantine-Venetian Treaty of 1082". Mediterranean Historical Review. 24 (1): 1–16.
- Benedetti, Graziano. "Lagune del Friuli-Venezia Giulia: itinerari, tradizioni & antichi sapori. Alla scoperta di una natura affascinante.", in LEGUIDE MAGNUS, 1994.
- Bisconti F., Temi di iconografia paleocristiana, Vatican City, 2000.
- Bovini G., "Grado paleocristiana", in Archeologia Cristiana, Bologna 1973.
- Farioli R., "Mosaici pavimentali dell'alto Adriatico e dell'Africa settentrionale in età bizantina", in Antichità Altoadriatiche, vo. V.paleocristiana, Ravenna 1975.
- Farioli R., Pavimenti musivi di Ravenna, Ravenna 1975.
- Marocco, Ezio. "Grado: guida storico artistica", Bruno Fachin Editore – Trieste.
- Rentetzi, Efthalia. "Un'inedita figura di pesce. Parentele stilistiche tra i mosaici pavimentali di s. Maria delle Grazie e s. Eufemia a Grado", in Artonweb. Punti di visa sull'arte.
- Rentetzi, Efthalia. "Un frammento inedito di S. Eufemia a Grado. Il pavimento musivo del Salutatorium", in Arte Cristiana Archived 2010-04-04 at the Wayback Machine, fasc.. 850 (Gennaio – Febbraio 2009), Volume XCVI, p. 51-52.
