= LOT-EK =

Architecture practice

LOT-EK is an architectural practice based in Naples, Italy and New York. Founded in 1993 by Ada Tolla and Giuseppe Lignano, the firm has received recognition for its exhibition designs and site-specific installations for cultural institutions and museums, including the Whitney Museum of American Art, the Museum of Modern Art (MoMA), and the Walker Art Center.

LOT-EK's work explores the adaptive reuse (upcycling) of infrastructural and industrial objects, most notably the standard 40-foot shipping container. The studio has developed a number of projects using shipping containers as architectural building elements.

In addition to shipping containers, LOT-EK has incorporated other reused industrial elements in its projects, including truck bodies, airplane fuselages, and reclaimed wood or steel doors.

== Books ==
- MDU Mobile Dwelling Unit, DAP, 2003. ISBN 1-891024-68-X
- Urbanscan, Princeton Architectural Press, 2002. ISBN 1-56898-300-X
- LOT-EK Mixer, Edizioni Press, 2000. ISBN 0-9662230-9-8

== Selected works ==
- Whitney Studio (Whitney Museum of American Art, New York City)
- APAP OpenSchool (Anyang, Korea)
- Puma City (Multiple global ports; planned installation in Boston, MA)
- Sanlitun North (Beijing, China)
- Sanlitun South (Beijing, China)
- Weiner Residence (New York City)
- Russell-Fontanez Residence (New York City)
