= Sankt Margarethen bei Knittelfeld =

- Municipality
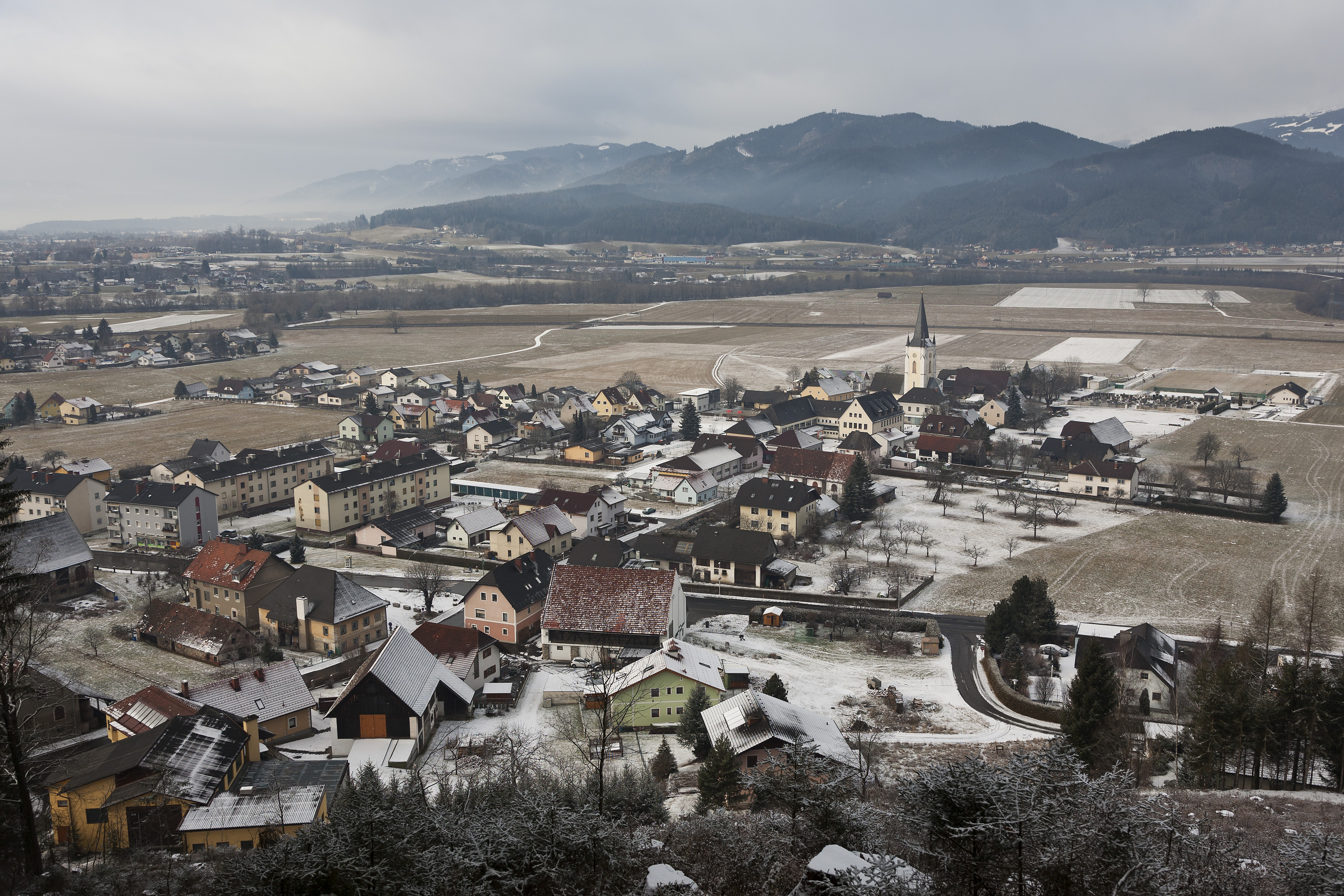
- View of Sankt Margarethen

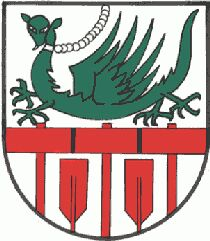
- Coat of arms

- Location within Austria
- Coordinates: 47°13′36″N 14°51′32″E
- Country: Austria
- State: Styria
- District: Murtal

Government
  - Mayor: Erwin Hinterdorfer (SPÖ)

Area
  - Total: 148.2 km^{2} (57.2 sq mi)
- Elevation: 623 m (2,044 ft)

Population (2018-01-01)
  - Total: 2,750
  - Density: 18.6/km^{2} (48.1/sq mi)
- Time zone: UTC+1 (CET)
  - Summer (DST): UTC+2 (CEST)
- Postal code: 8720
- Area code: +43 3512
- Vehicle registration: MT
- Website: st-margarethen-knittelfeld.gv.at

Sankt Margarethen bei Knittelfeld is a municipality in the Murtal District of Styria, Austria. It is located in Upper Styria, south of the Mur and southeast of Knittelfeld, at the foot of the Gleinalpe.

The municipality covers 148.2 km^{2} (57.2 sq mi) and had 2,666 inhabitants on 1 January 2025. The municipal office lies at an elevation of 633 m (2,077 ft), and the municipality has the official municipal number 62046.

The present municipality was enlarged on 1 January 2015 as part of the Styria municipal structural reform. The former municipalities of Sankt Lorenzen bei Knittelfeld and Rachau were merged into Sankt Margarethen bei Knittelfeld. Since then, the municipality has consisted of the main areas of Sankt Margarethen, Sankt Lorenzen and Rachau. Its cadastral communities include St. Margarethen, Pichl, Preg, St. Lorenzen, Glein, Mitterbach, Rachau I and Rachau II.

Sankt Margarethen bei Knittelfeld is a rural residential municipality with agricultural land, forested slopes and scattered settlements between the Mur valley and the Gleinalpe. It is promoted as part of the Murtal tourism region and is known locally for hiking, cycling and mountain-bike routes. The municipality also lies near the Murradweg, a long-distance cycle route along the Mur.

Among the municipality’s historic sites is the church of St. Benedikten, located on a terrace at the southern edge of the Aichfeld. The church was documented in 1147, although an earlier chapel may have stood on the site. Its later development produced a twin-church layout with two chancels, and the interior includes a late Gothic winged altar from the early 16th century.
