= Rachau =

- Former municipality
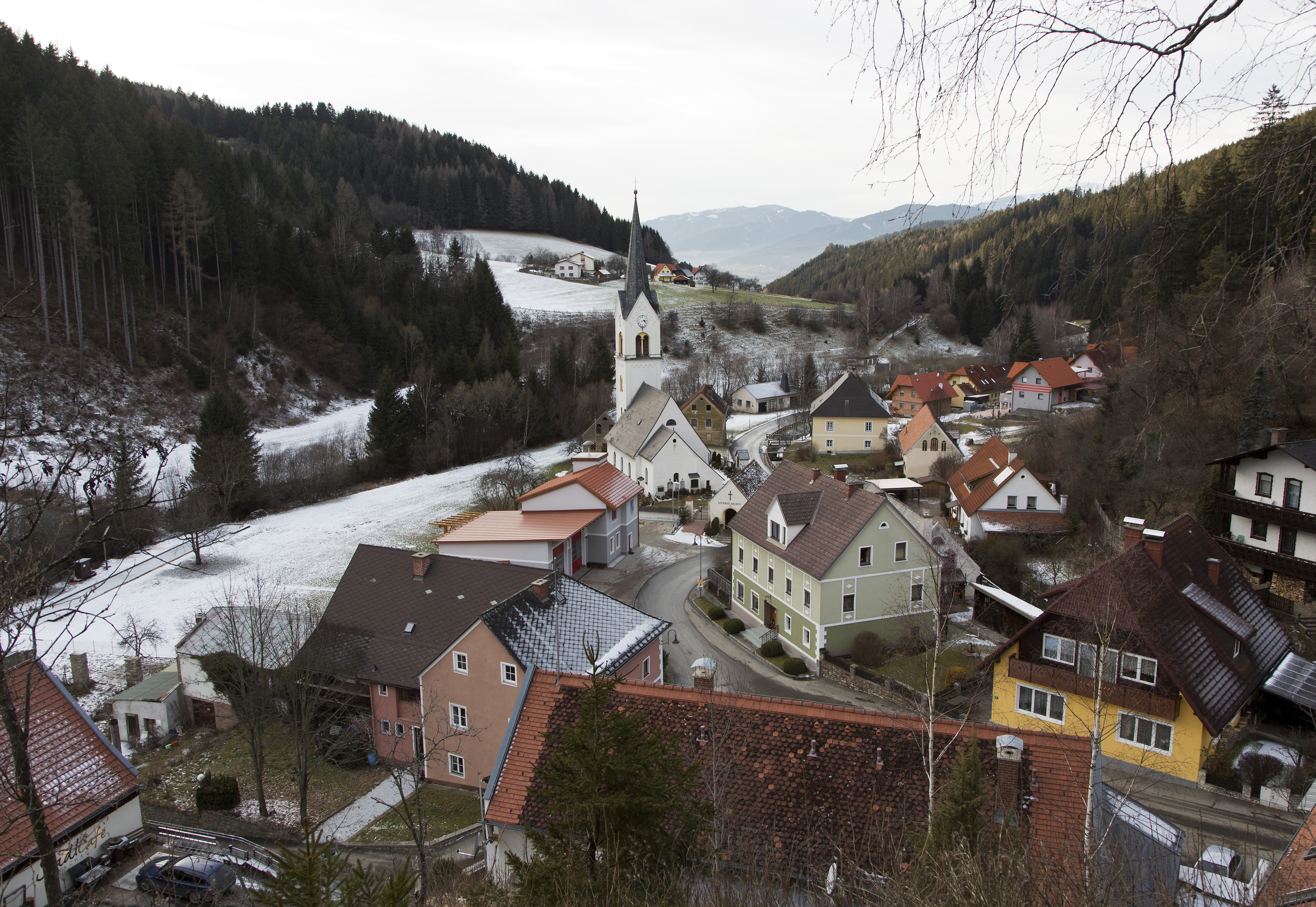
- View of Rachau

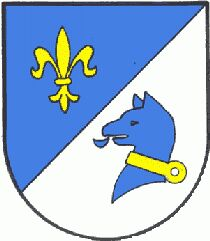
- Coat of arms

- Location within Austria
- Coordinates: 47°13′02″N 14°54′54″E
- Country: Austria
- State: Styria
- District: Murtal

Area
  - Total: 104.93 km^{2} (40.51 sq mi)

Population (1 January 2016)
  - Total: 613
  - Density: 5.84/km^{2} (15.1/sq mi)
- Time zone: UTC+1 (CET)
  - Summer (DST): UTC+2 (CEST)
- Postal code: 8720
- Area code: 03512
- Vehicle registration: KF
- Website: Gemeinde Rachau

Rachau is a former municipality in the district of Murtal in Styria, Austria with 626 inhabitants. Since the 2015 Styria municipal structural reform, it is part of the municipality Sankt Margarethen bei Knittelfeld. It is divided into three districts: Mitterbach, Glein Rachau, and the village of Rachau itself. Neighbouring settlements include Apfelberg, St. Margarethen, St. Lorenzen, Kleinlobming, St. Stefan ob Leoben, Salla, Übelbach, Kainach bei Voitsberg und Gallmannsegg.

The Mayor of Rachau was Karl Hirtler of the ÖVP; Bernadette Hartleb (ÖVP) was vice mayor. There is a primary school and two volunteer firefighters in the village.

== Rachau hillclimb ==
From 1995 to 2004 Rachau hosted a hillclimbing event. Riders of motorbikes and also quadbikes and even the occasional car or converted jetski/snowmobile would attempt to ride as far up the hillside as possible without falling off. Whoever attained the greatest distance won the event. This was televised across Europe on Eurosport and attracted a trackside audience of 10,000 to 30,000 people. It also had sponsorship from the drink Red Bull.

== Witches' trail ==
Rachau has a trail known as the Witches' Trail (German: Hexenpfad). It starts at a church and it contains signs that children enjoy.
