= Ada Tolla =

Italian architect (born 1964)

- Born: 29 February 1964 (age 62); Potenza, Italy
- Education: University of Naples Federico II
- Occupation: Architect

Ada Tolla (born 29 February 1964) is an Italian architect and co-founder with Giuseppe Lignano of the architectural practice LOT-EK, known for its sustainable design approach and for projects based on the adaptive reuse (or upcycling) of industrial objects.

== Life and career ==
Tolla was born in Potenza but raised in Naples. She graduated in Architecture and Urban planning from the University of Naples Federico II in 1989, and later attended postgraduate studies at Columbia University, in New York City. In 1993, she co-founded with Giuseppe Lignano the LOT-EK practice, based in Naples. They opened a second studio in New York in 1995. She is adjunct assistant professor at Columbia University Graduate School of Architecture, Planning and Preservation.

In December 2011, Tolla was recognized as a United States Artists (USA) Booth Fellow of Architecture and Design.

She has designed exhibitions and site-specific installations for major cultural institutions and museums, including the Museum of Modern Art, the Whitney Museum of American Art, and the MAXXI.

Tolla is a member of the Board of Administration of the Fondazione Architetti Napoli.
