= Giuseppe Lignano =

Italian architect (born 1963)

- Born: 5 September 1963 (age 63); Naples, Italy
- Education: University of Naples Federico II
- Occupation: Architect

Giuseppe Lignano (born 5 September 1963) is an Italian architect and co-founder, with Ada Tolla, of the architectural practice LOT-EK. The studio is known for its sustainable design approach and for projects based on the adaptive reuse (or upcycling) of industrial objects and systems not originally intended for architecture.

== Life and career ==
Lignano graduated in Architecture and Urban planning from the University of Naples Federico II in 1989, and later attended postgraduate studies at Columbia University, in New York City. In 1993, he co-founded with Ada Tolla the LOT-EK practice, based in Naples and New York. He is adjunct assistant professor at Columbia University Graduate School of Architecture, Planning and Preservation.

A container-based project, the Mobile Dwelling Unit (MDU), was exhibited at the Whitney Museum of American Art in 2004.

In December 2011, Lignano was recognized as a United States Artists Booth Fellow of Architecture and Design.
