= Marano Lagoon =

Lagoon in northeastern Italy

Designations

Ramsar Wetland
- Official name: Laguna di Marano: Foci dello Stella
- Designated: 14 May 1979
- Reference no.: 190

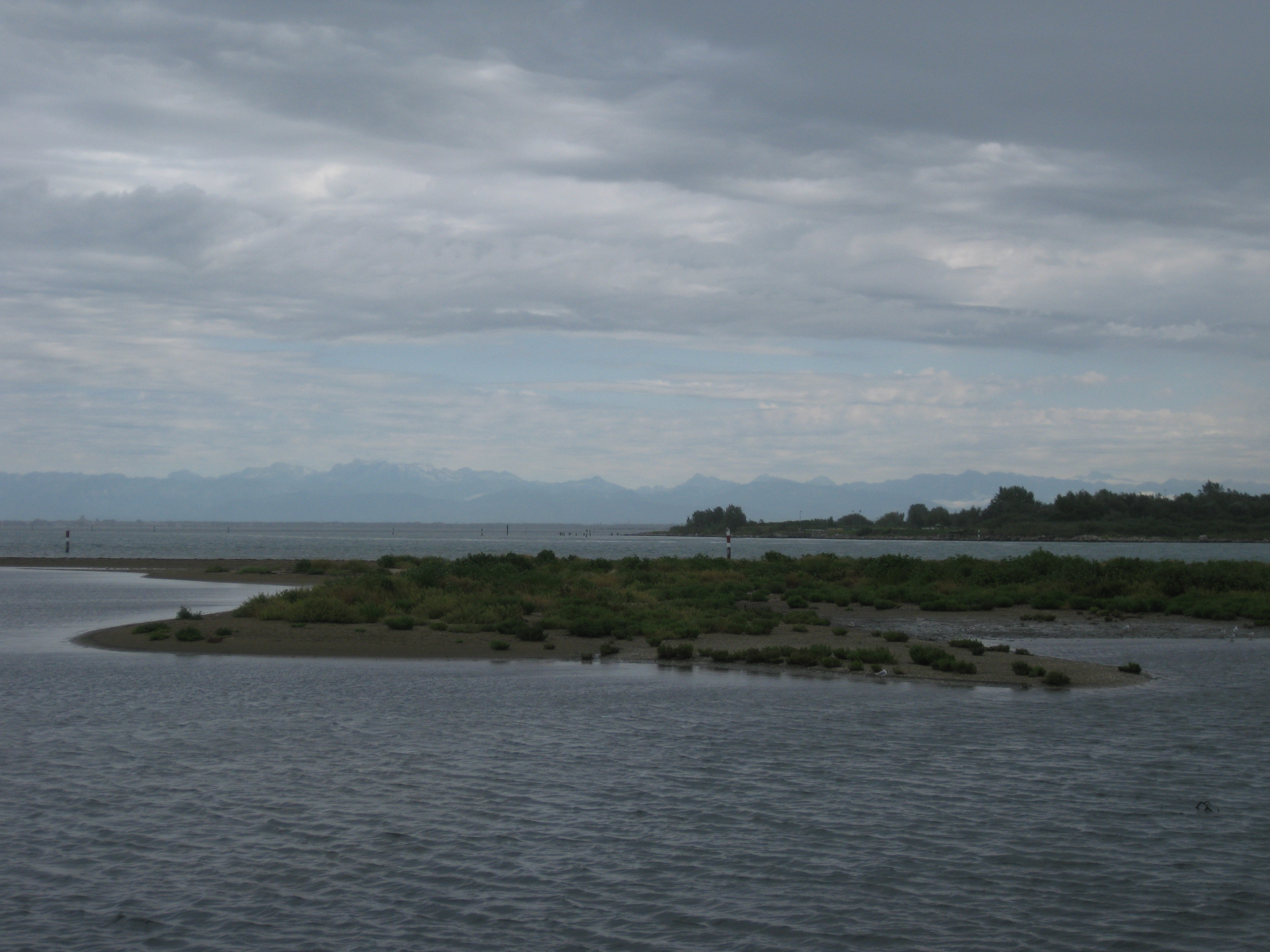
Marano lagoon near Lignano Sabbiadoro

Marano Lagoon is a huge lagoon in northeastern Italy. It has a surface area of around 160 square kilometres (62 sq mi).

== Description ==
Marano Lagoon stretches from Lignano Sabbiadoro to the east for about 30 kilometres (19 mi). It is considered the twin of the Venice Lagoon, that is located a few kilometers to the west. Sometimes it is called Marano-Grado Lagoon, but geographically it is divided in two sections: Marano Lagoon and Grado Lagoon.

=== Grado ===
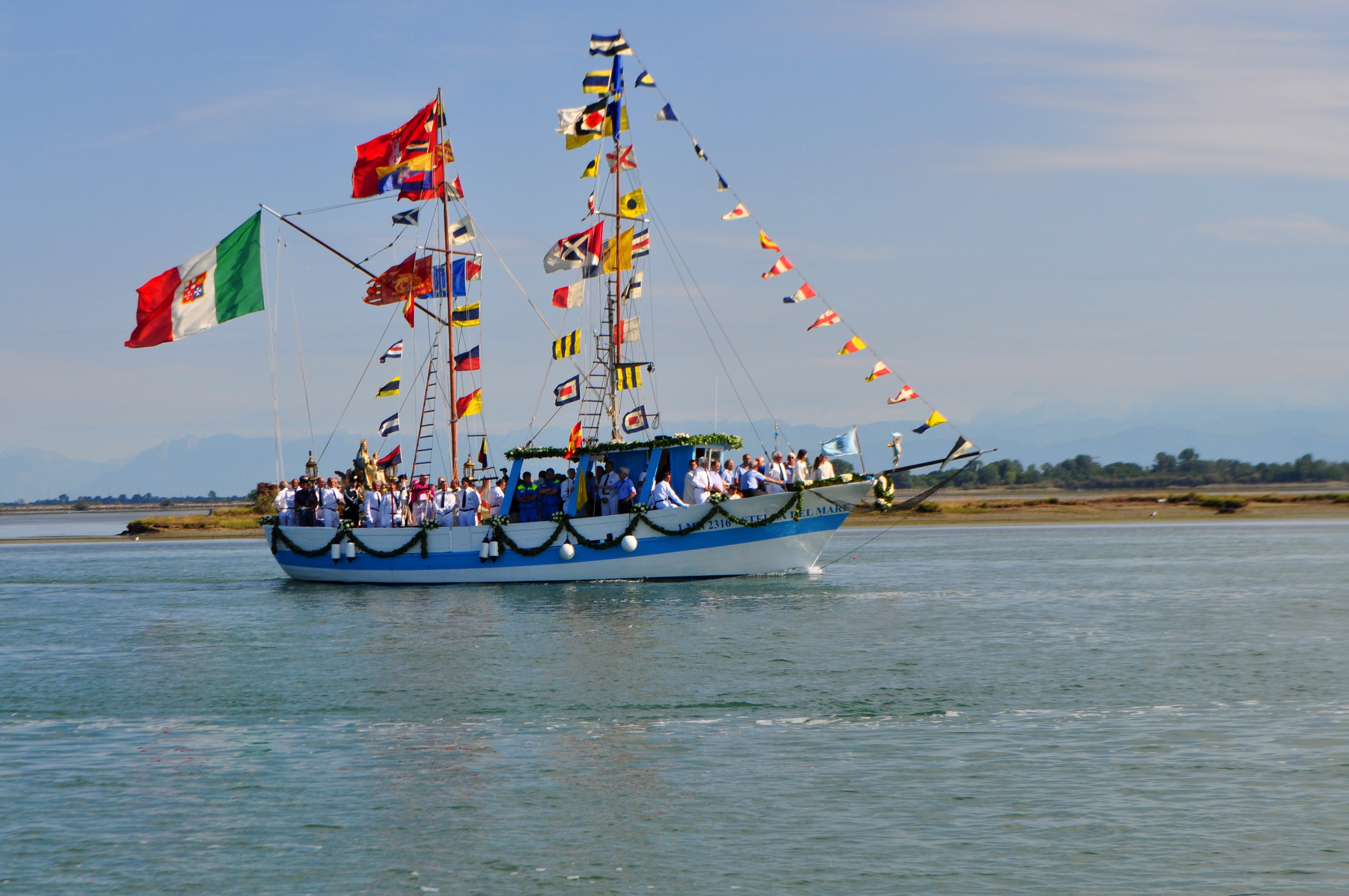
Boat Procession "Perdòn di Barban" near the Barbana island, inside the Marano-Grado Lagoon

The section usually called "Grado Lagoon" is an Italian lagoon located in the northern Adriatic Sea which extends from the island of Fossalon (near Grado) to the island of Anfora, next to the mouth of the small river Aussa.

The lagoon, which covers an area of about 90 square kilometres (35 sq mi) and has nearly 120 islands, is divided into an eastern sector (called in Italian "Palud de sopra") and a western sector ("Palud de soto").

The origins of the lagoon are relatively recent. Until the fifth century the land covered all the area, as evidenced by several archaeological findings, including a Roman road, now entirely covered by water, which connected Aquileia to its port of Grado.

Characteristic of the Grado lagoon is the presence of houses called casoni, simple homes with roofs of straw used by the fishermen of Grado.

The typical boat of the inhabitants of the lagoon is the batèla, which has a flat bottom and is operated by rowing. A batèla is usually 5 to 10 metres (16 to 33 ft) long, is guided by an oarsman standing in the stern, and may be equipped with a sail.

The lagoon, which is bordered to the west by the section called Marano Lagoon, is crossed longitudinally by the Venetian Coastal Waterway, which connects Venice with the mouth of the Isonzo river.

==== West Lagoon (Palud de soto) ====
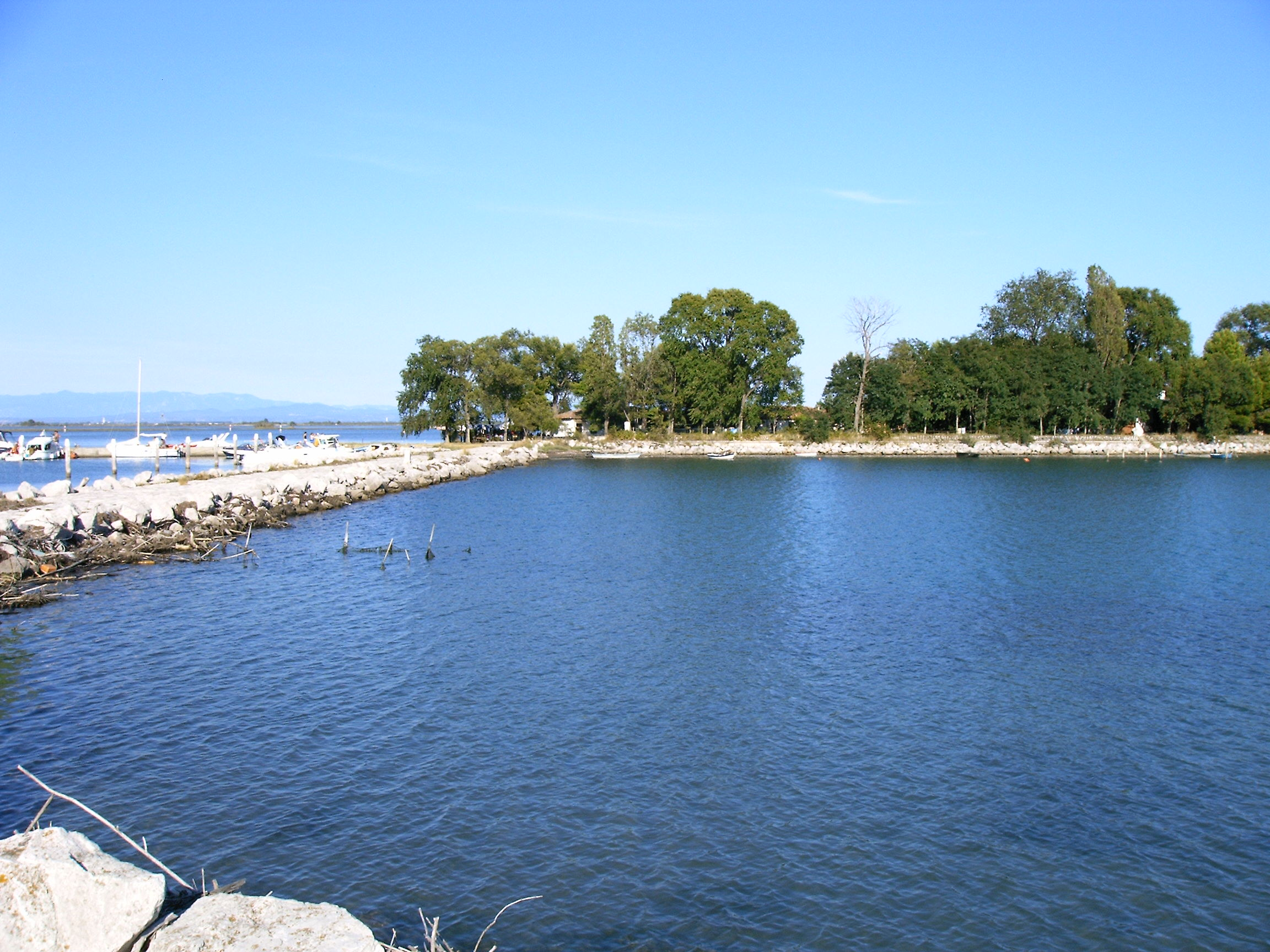
The island of "Porto Buso" inside the Marano-Grado Lagoon

The West Lagoon (Palud de soto) is the larger lagoon and includes nearly 100 islands, like the beautiful island of Martignano. It is crossed by numerous canals, which are arranged along the main islands. Among the islands, near Grado, is the small island of San Pietro d'Orio, which for centuries was the seat of a monastery; the island of Ravaiarina, which is now the site of fishing ponds and facilities, and the island of Gorgo, formerly called Saints Cosimo and Damiano, which previously housed a church and, during World War II, an Italian military base.

Farther west of Grado in the direction of Marano Lagoon are, among other small islands, the island of Morgo, which has widespread vegetation and was well known in the past for its agricultural production, and the island of Beli, which owes its name to the legendary witch Bela who confused sailors. The westernmost island is Anfora, which acquired strategic importance in 1866 when it became the boundary between Italy and the Austrian Empire, which became Austria-Hungary in 1867. Today it houses the small island town of Porto Buso.

==== East Lagoon (Palud de sora) ====
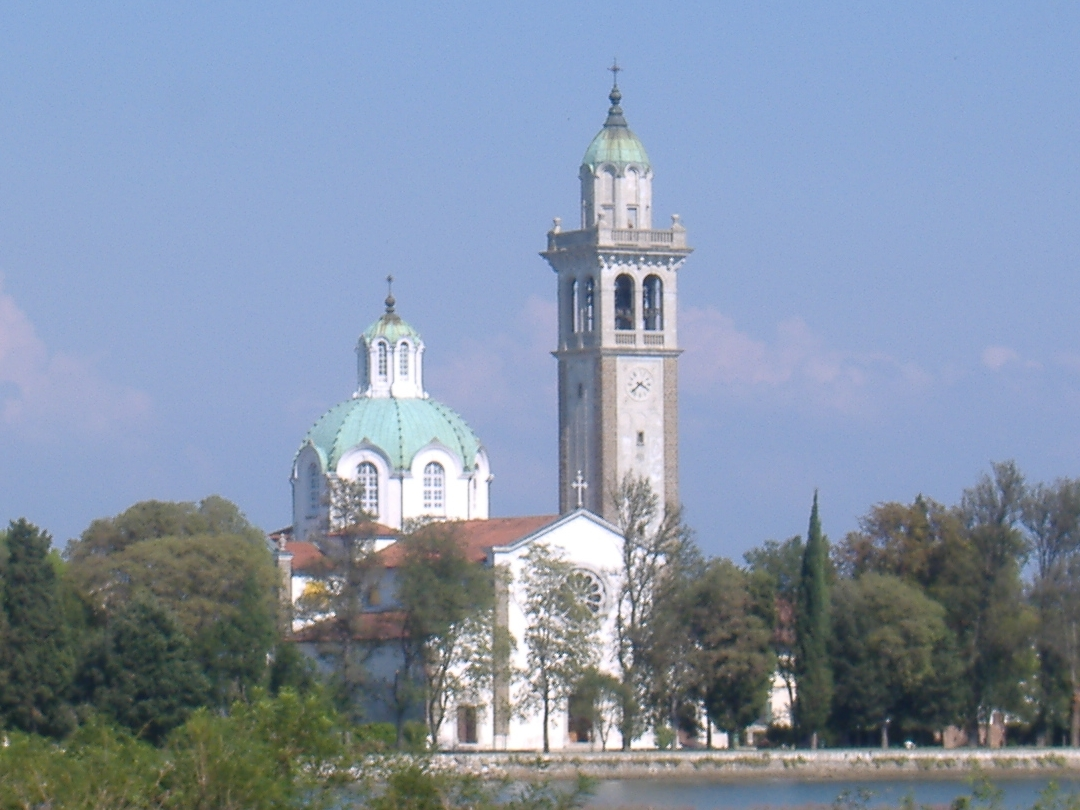
Barbana island, with the Marian sanctuary

The East Lagoon (Palud de sora) is more recent and shallower. After a land reclamation project at the island of Fossalon which took place in the first half of the 20th century, the East Lagoon's water area is substantially halved. The Valle Cavanata Nature Reserve lies in the reclaimed land.

Compared to the Western Lagoon, the East Lagoon has fewer islands, but they have a large number of huge trees, notably on the easternmost island of Panera. Between the islands stands Barbana, which is home to the 1,500-year-old Sanctuary of Mary, Mother of Jesus and is permanently inhabited by a community of Franciscan friars. The island is visited each year during the celebration of the Perdòn di Barban, a pilgrimage which on the first Sunday in July which includes a procession in the lagoon from Grado to Barbana of boats decorated with flags .

The island of Schiusa, recently created with fill material and now entirely urbanized and integrated with Grado, lies in the East Lagoon.

The island-town of Grado, which, like Venice, historically consisted of small islands, is the largest of the Grado Lagoon and is located just 20 kilometres (12 mi) from the mouth of the river Isonzo.

=== Marano ===
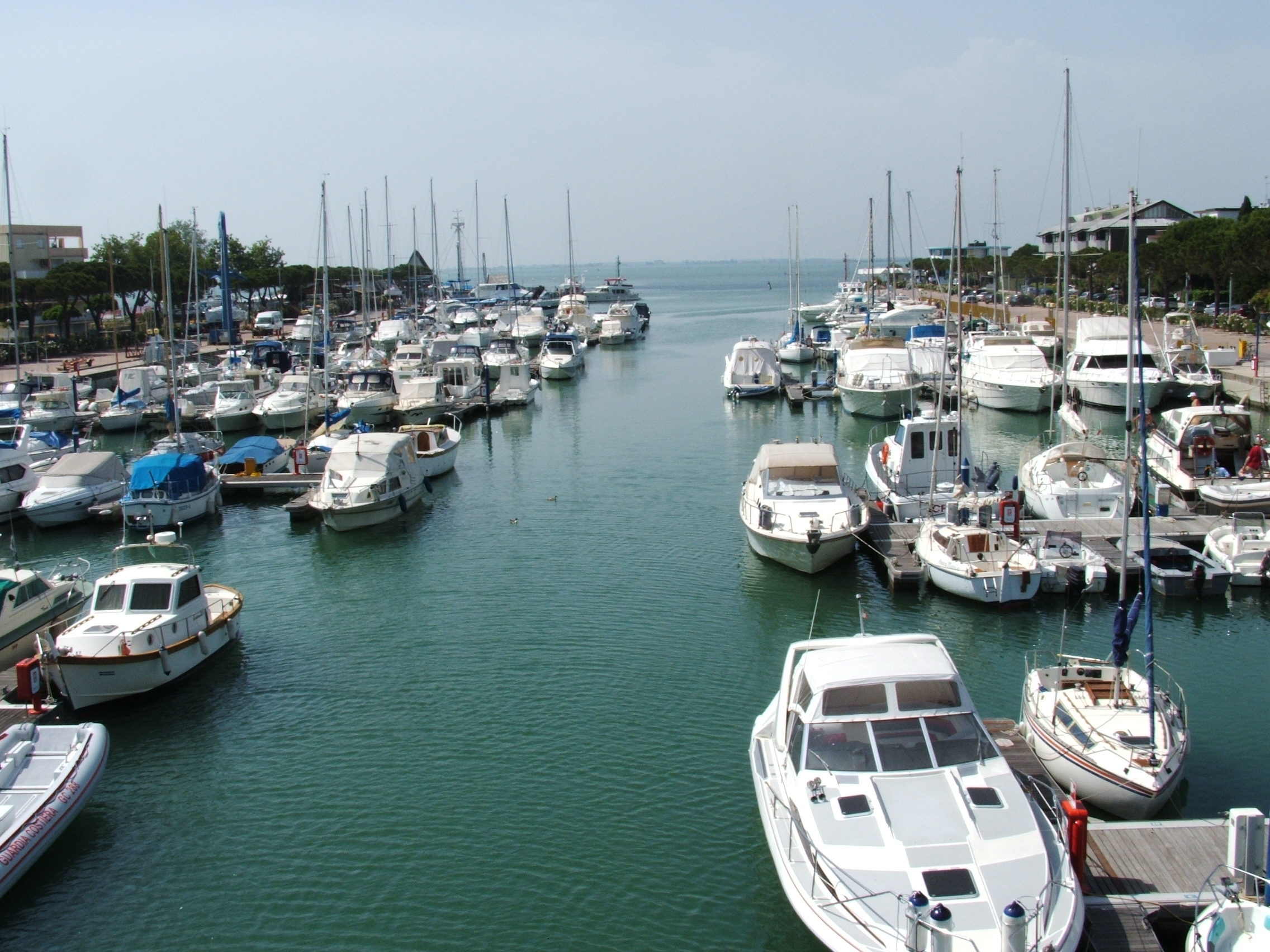
The Lignano "Porto Vecchio" overlooking the Marano lagoon

The Marano Lagoon section covers an area of 70 square kilometres (27 sq mi) and has fewer islands than the Grado Lagoon section. Sometimes the Grado and the Marano lagoons are considered a single huge lagoon called in Italian "Grado-Marano Laguna" or "Laguna di Grado, stretching from Grado to Lignano Sabbiadoro and called "the twin sister of the Venice Lagoon (Laguna di Venezia). However the Marano Lagoon is under the administration of the "Comune di Marano Lagunare" while the eastern Grado Lagoon section is administered mainly by the Comune di Grado.

The Marano section of the lagoon is crossed longitudinally by the "Venetian coast waterway", a waterway that connects Venice with the mouth of the Isonzo. This section starts on the southern side with Lignano Sabbiadoro, a resort city developed mainly after World War II. The Marano section stretches to the Palud de Soto near Porto Buso and the island of Anfora, next to the mouth of the small river Aussa.

The mooring complex (marina) of Lignano Sabbiadoro is the largest in Italy and among the largest in Europe, having more than 5,000 berths. The various structures of Aprilia Marittima, the harbour Marina Punta Faro, and the docks Porto Vecchio are strategically positioned around and near the southern areas of the Marano Lagoon.

The Nature Reserve of the Marano Lagoon stretches over more than 1,400 hectares (3,459 acres), and it actually consists of two smaller reserves, the Reserve of the Stella River Mouth (Riserva Foci dello Stella) and the Reserve of the Nuovo Valley Canal (Riserva Valle Canal Novo). The environment consists mainly of reed thickets, water, and sandbanks. What is specific to the Marano Lagoon is the variety of water salinity levels. This variety has enabled the development of an impressive biodiversity, both on land and in water. However, bird life is the most prominent in the lagoon, which is why birders are highly likely to get a special satisfaction while visiting the lagoon.

== Main islands in the Marano-Grado Lagoon ==
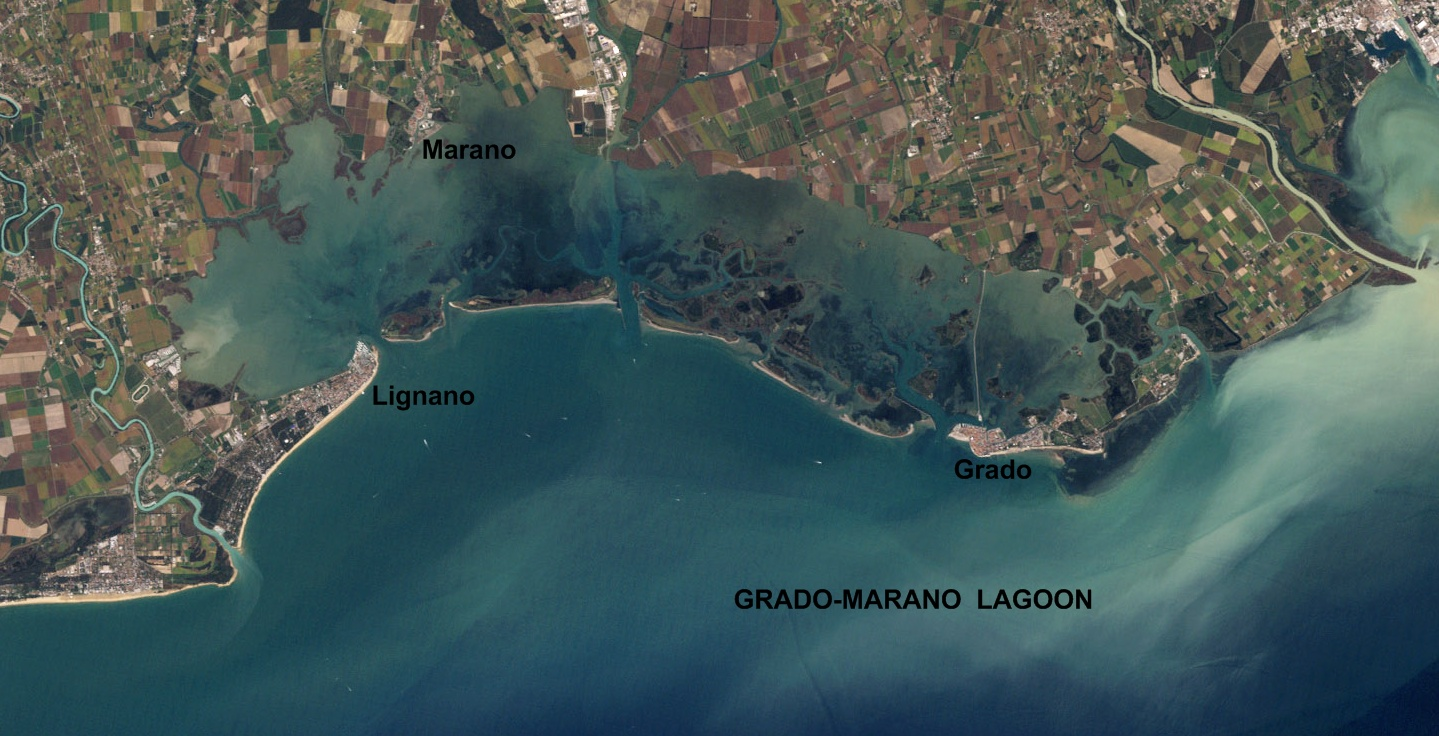
Marano-Grado lagoon satellite image

The most important of the nearly 120 islands in the Marano-Grado Lagoon are:

- Anfora (canal), 45°45′14″N 13°16′19″E
- Barbana island, 45°42′12″N 13°25′23″E
- Beli
- Fossalon
- Gorgo
- Grado, 45°40′40″N 13°23′41″E
- Martignano
- Isola Morgo, 45°42′24″N 13°19′01″E
- Panera
- Porto Buso (harbor), 45°43′24″N 13°14′50″E
- Isola Ravaiarina, 45°41′37″N 13°21′46″E
- San Pietro d'Orio
- Schiusa (canal), 45°41′00″N 13°24′00″E

== See also ==
- List of islands of Italy
- Venice Lagoon
- Valle Cavanata Nature Reserve

== Bibliography ==
- Guida d'Italia. Friuli-Venezia Giulia. Touring Editore S.r.l. and Arnaldo Mondadori Editore. Milano, 2005
