= Sankt Lorenzen bei Knittelfeld =

- Former municipality
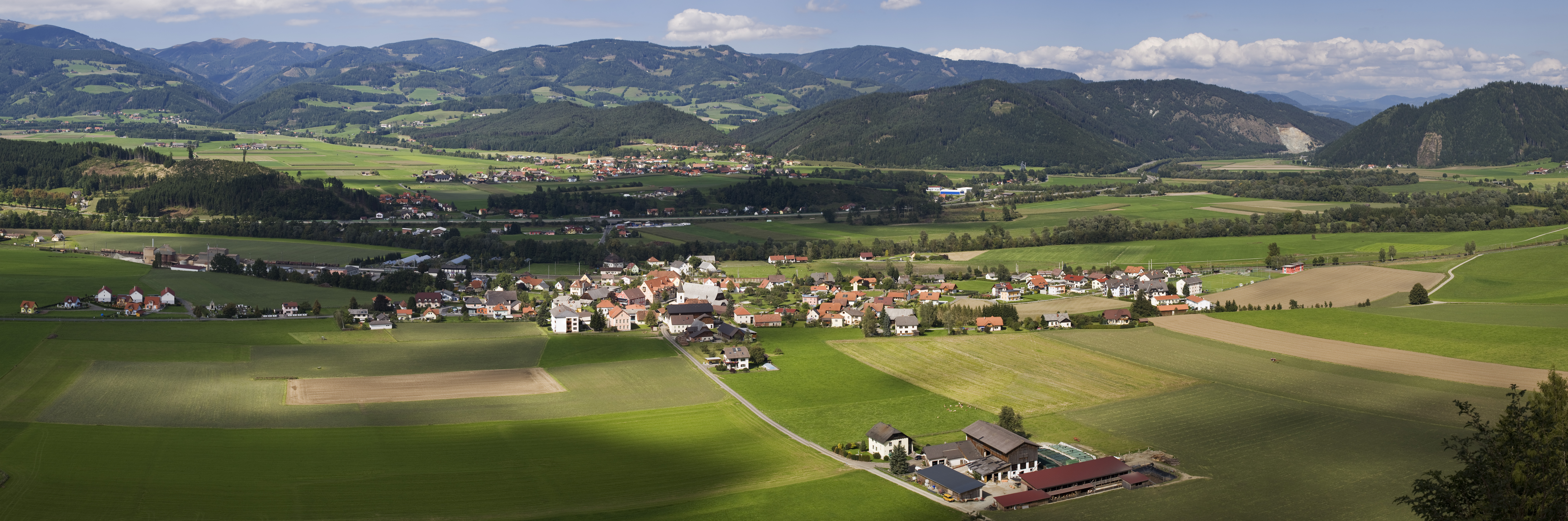
- Sankt Lorenzen bei Knittelfeld seen from the south

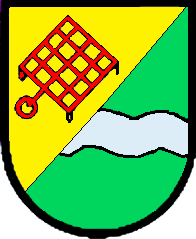
- Coat of arms

- Location within Austria
- Coordinates: 47°15′00″N 14°53′00″E
- Country: Austria
- State: Styria
- District: Murtal

Area
  - Total: 35.88 km^{2} (13.85 sq mi)
- Elevation: 610 m (2,000 ft)

Population (1 January 2016)
  - Total: 804
  - Density: 22.4/km^{2} (58.0/sq mi)
- Time zone: UTC+1 (CET)
  - Summer (DST): UTC+2 (CEST)
- Postal code: 8715
- Area code: 03515
- Vehicle registration: KF
- Website: www.st-lorenzen-knittelfeld.at

Sankt Lorenzen bei Knittelfeld is a former municipality in the district of Murtal in Styria, Austria. Since the 2015 Styria municipal structural reform, it is part of the municipality Sankt Margarethen bei Knittelfeld.
