= Lignano Riviera =

- Frazione
- Location of Lignano Riviera in Italy
- Coordinates: 45°41′N 13°07′E
- Country: Italy
- Region: Friuli-Venezia Giulia
- Province: Udine (UD)
- Comune: Lignano Sabbiadoro
- Elevation: 2 m (6.6 ft)
- Demonym: Lignanesi
- Time zone: UTC+1 (CET)
  - Summer (DST): UTC+2 (CEST)
- Postal code: 33054
- Dialing code: +39 0431
- Patron saint: St. John Bosco
- Saint day: 31 January
- Website: Official website

Lignano Riviera is a frazione of the city of Lignano Sabbiadoro, comune in the province of Udine, in the Friuli-Venezia Giulia region of north-eastern Italy. It is one of the main summer resorts in northern Italy.

== See also ==
- Lignano Sabbiadoro
- Lignano Pineta
