= Lignano Pineta =

- Frazione
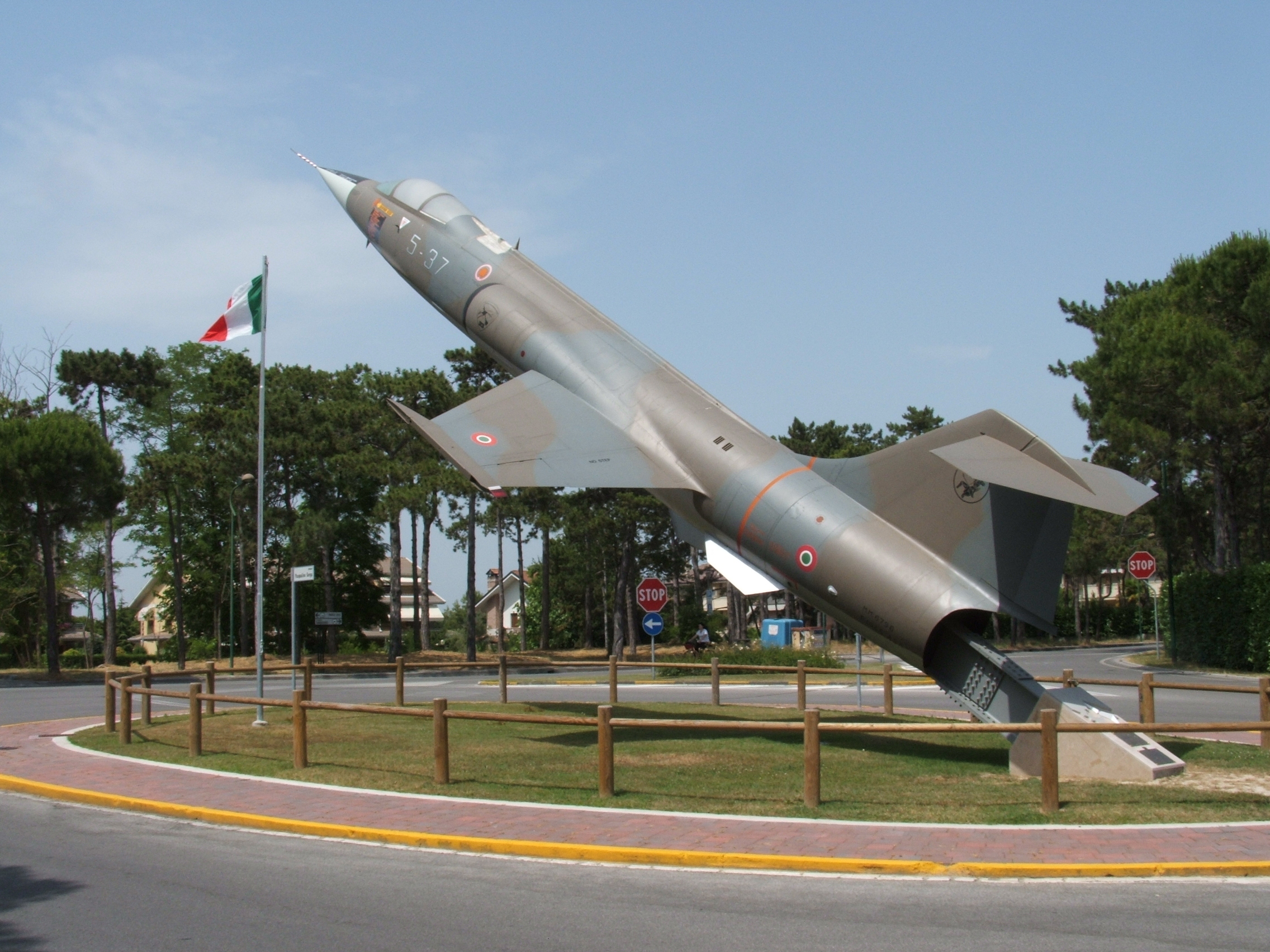
- The Aeritalia F-104S at Pineta

- Location of Lignano Pineta in Italy
- Coordinates: 45°41′N 13°07′E
- Country: Italy
- Region: Friuli-Venezia Giulia
- Province: Udine (UD)
- Comune: Lignano Sabbiadoro
- Elevation: 2 m (6.6 ft)
- Demonym: Lignanesi
- Time zone: UTC+1 (CET)
  - Summer (DST): UTC+2 (CEST)
- Postal code: 33054
- Dialing code: +39 0431
- Patron saint: St. John Bosco
- Saint day: 31 January
- Website: Official website

Lignano Pineta is a frazione of the city of Lignano Sabbiadoro, comune in the province of Udine, in the Friuli-Venezia Giulia region of north-eastern Italy, one of the major summer resorts in northern Italy.

== History ==
The idea of developing a new town at this site was initialized by a group of local entrepreneurs. On 5 June 1953, the first tractor began to plough through the dunes of the local pine forest, marking the first streets of Lignano Pineta.

At the time the project was widely reported on in magazines, on the one hand for its originality and functionality, and on the other for scarring the landscape and destroying the pine forest.

== Spiral ==
The innovative street plan, with its "main road" in a spiral shape, was designed by the architect Marcello D'Olivo.

The coat of arms of the mother comune Lignano Sabbiadoro carries a green spiral in reminiscence of the streets of Lignano Pineta.

== Images ==
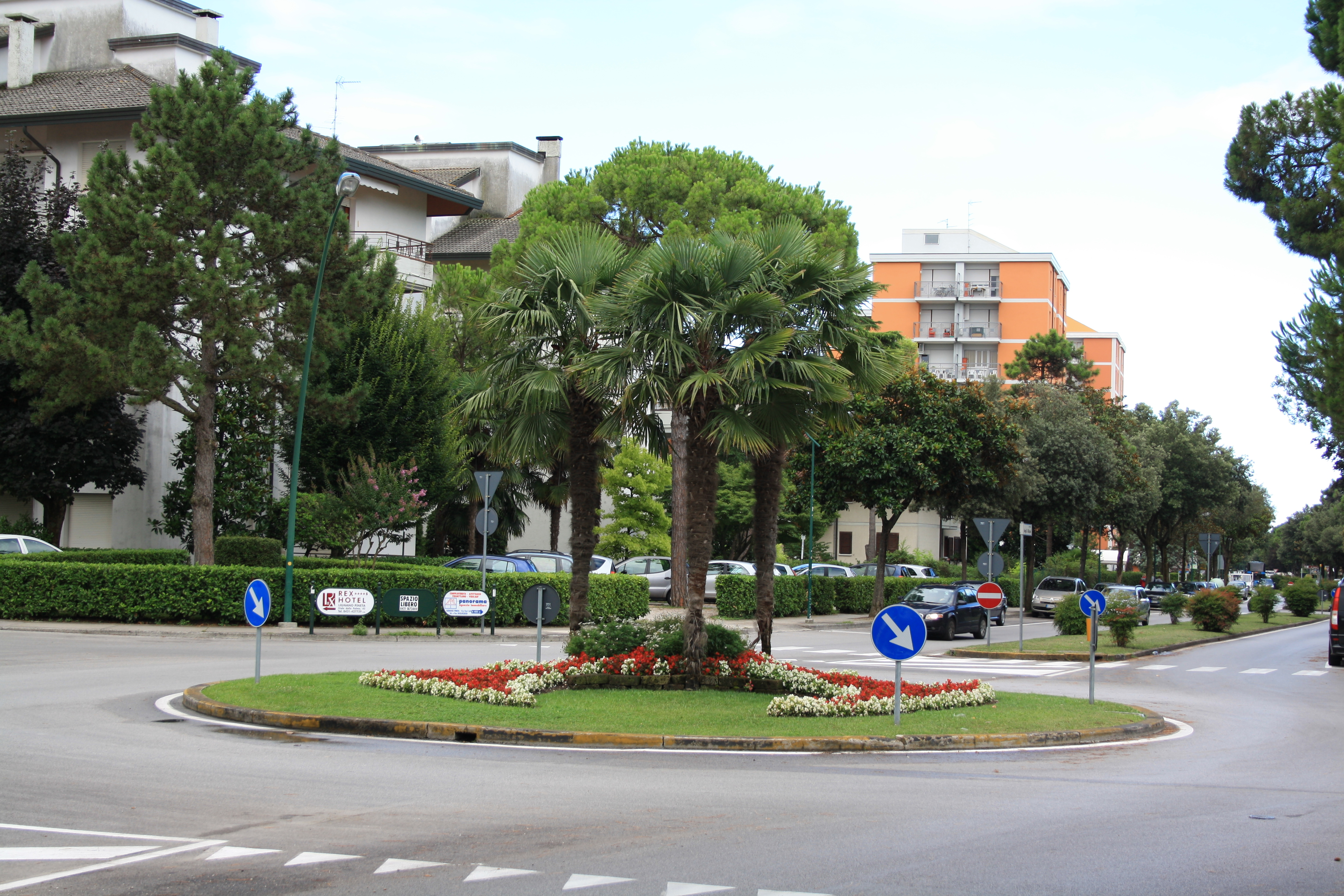
Square in Pineta

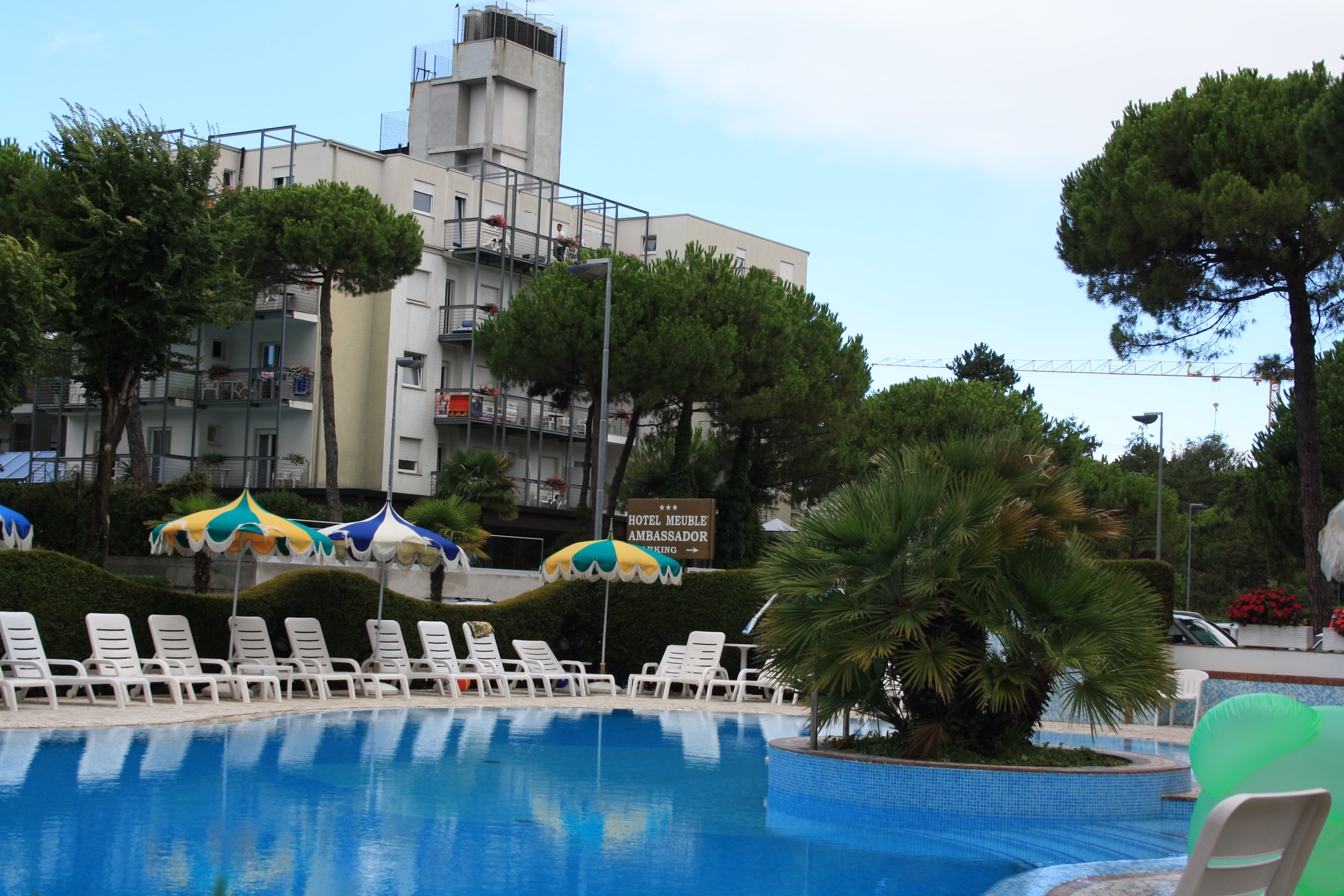
Resort in Pineta

Coat of arms of the comune of Lignano Sabbiadoro

== See also ==
- Palmanova
