= Lignano Sabbiadoro =

Town in Friuli-Venezia Giulia, Italy

Lignano Sabbiadoro Lignan (Friulian)
- Comune
- Città di Lignano Sabbiadoro
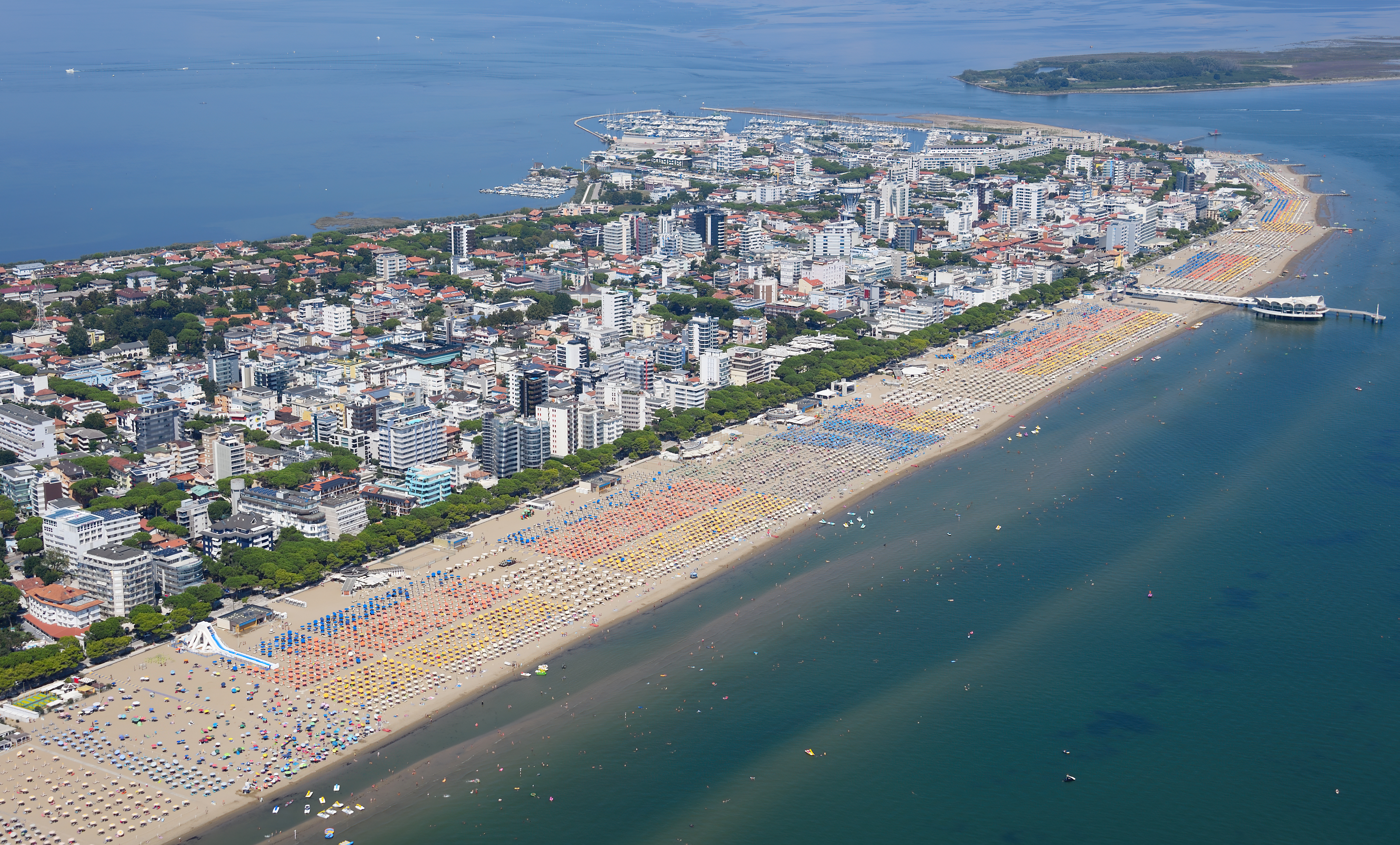

- Coat of arms

- Location within Italy Location within Friuli-Venezia Giulia
- Coordinates: 45°41′N 13°07′E
- Country: Italy
- Region: Friuli-Venezia Giulia
- Province: Udine (UD)

Government
  - Mayor: Laura Giorgi (Forza Italia)

Area
  - Total: 16.21 km^{2} (6.26 sq mi)
- Elevation: 2 m (6.6 ft)

Population (30 September 2019)
  - Total: 6,837
  - Density: 421.8/km^{2} (1,092/sq mi)
- Demonym: Lignanesi
- Time zone: UTC+1 (CET)
  - Summer (DST): UTC+2 (CEST)
- Postal code: 33054
- Dialing code: 0431
- ISTAT code: 030049
- Patron saint: St. John Bosco
- Saint day: 31 January
- Website: Official website

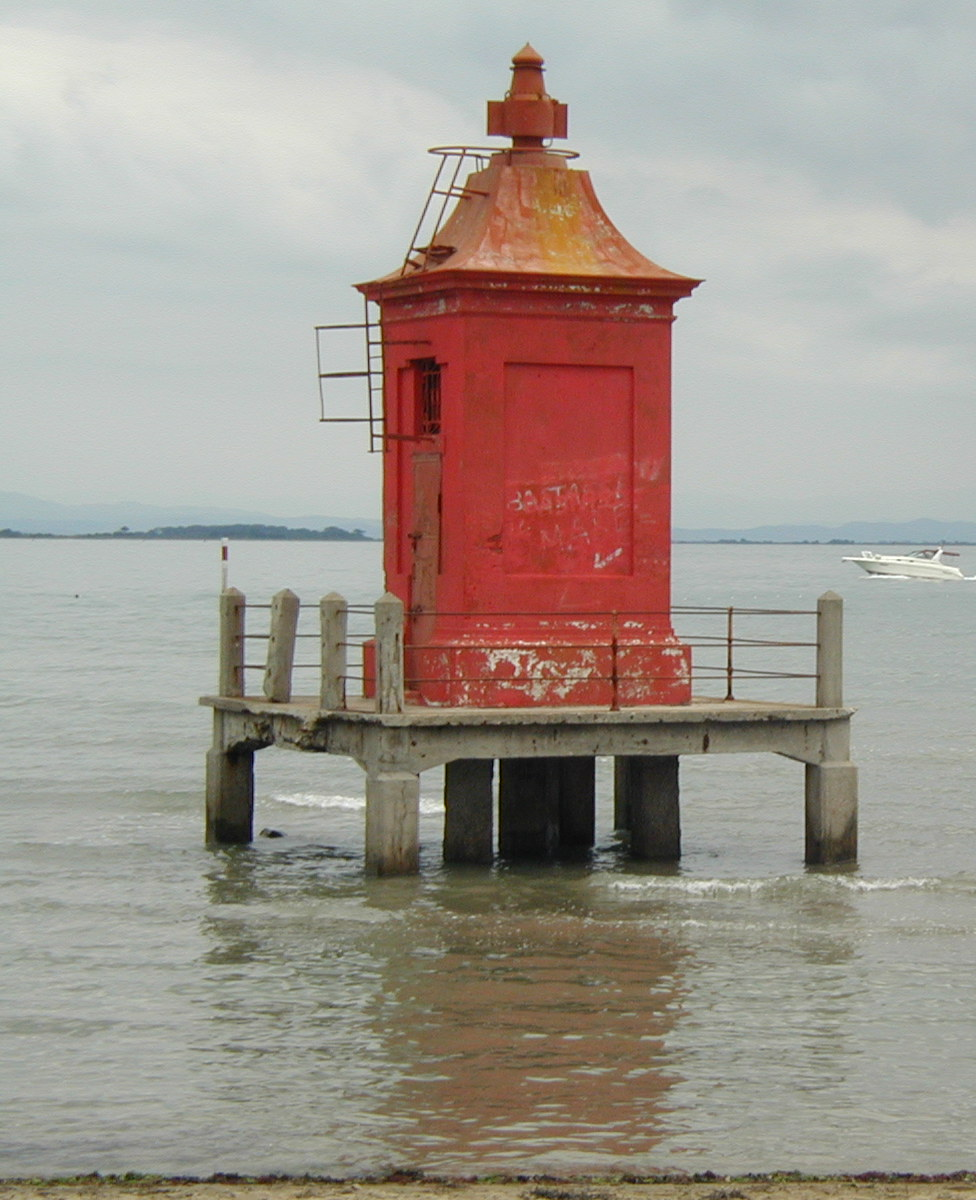
Lighthouse in Lignano Sabbiadoro.

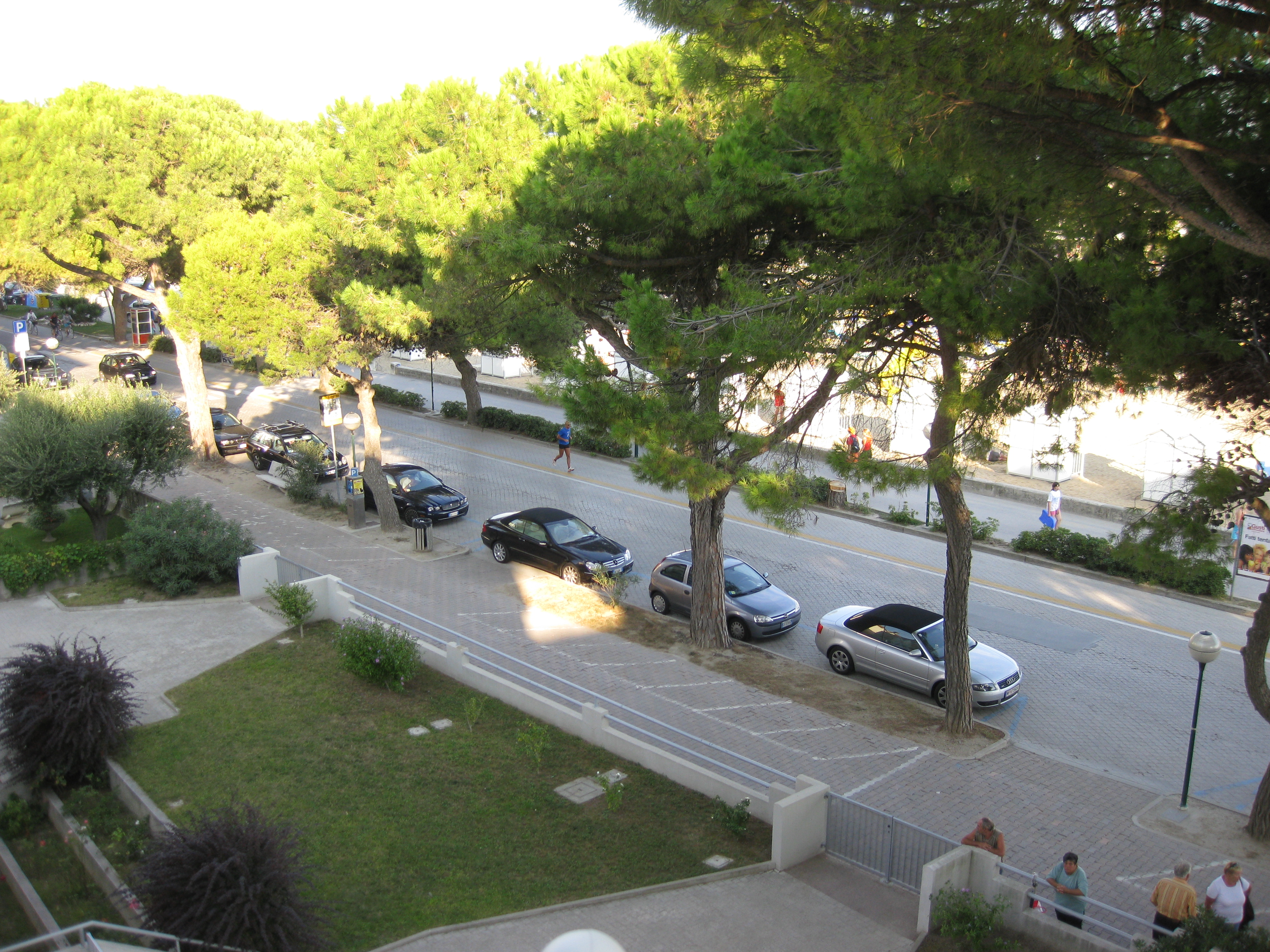
Lungomare Trieste.

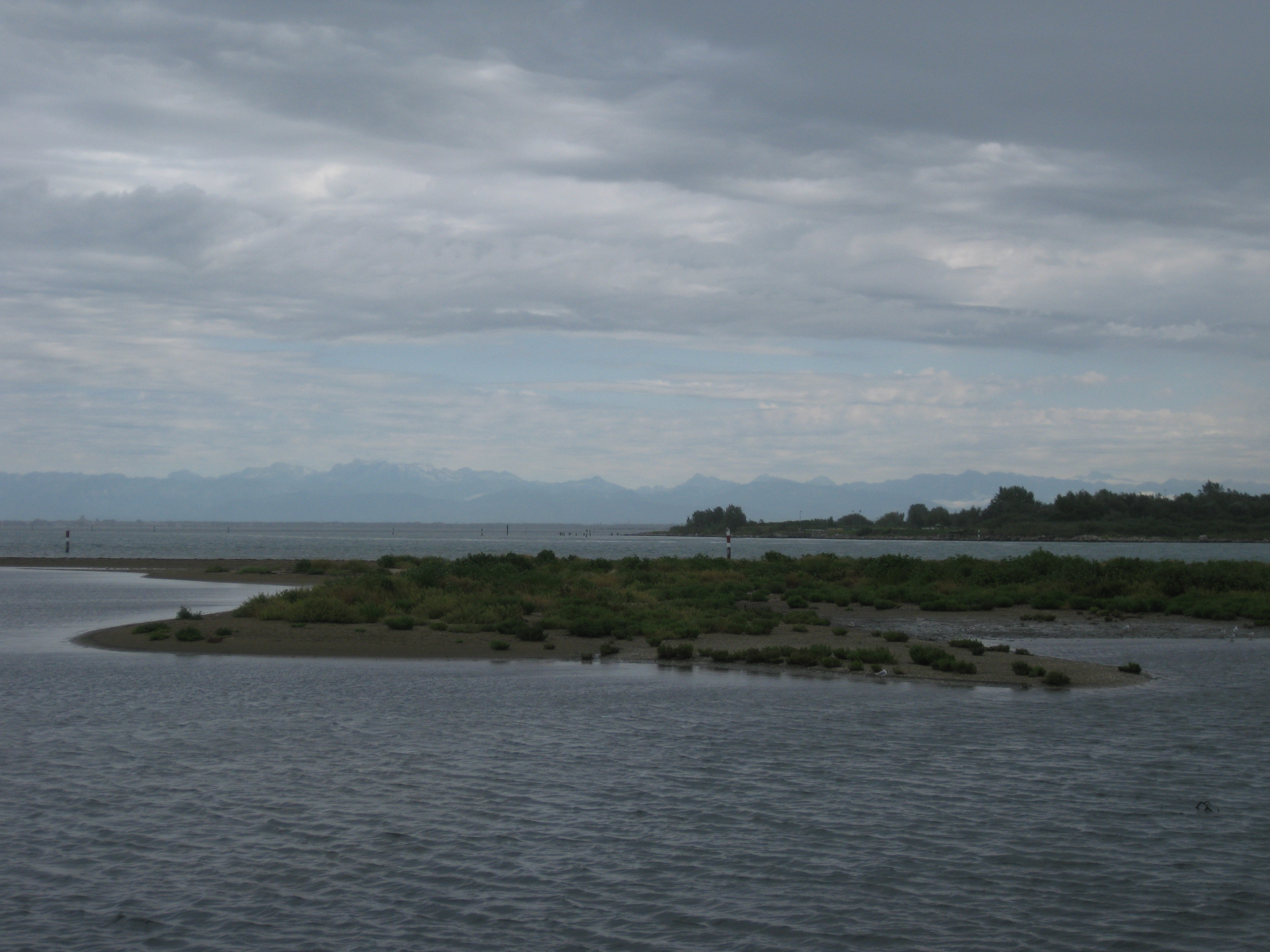
Marano Lagoon.

Lignano Sabbiadoro (Italian: [liɲˈɲaːno ˌsabbjaˈdɔːro]; Friulian: Lignan) is a town and comune (municipality) in the Regional decentralization entity of Udine, in the Friuli-Venezia Giulia region of north-eastern Italy. It is one of the main summer resorts in northern Italy and on the Adriatic Sea coast.

== History ==
Lignano Sabbiadoro developed in the early 20th century starting from some private hospitality resorts, which at the beginning could be reached only by sea. The first permanent inhabitants settled in the area in 1931, after the draining of the nearby marshes. The first road connecting Lignano with the nearby comune of Latisana was built in 1926.

Formerly known as simply Lignano, the name Sabbiadoro (from sabbia d'oro "golden sand") was added in 1935 for promotional reasons.

It is divided into three zones, each with its own particular traits: the historic centre, rife with shops and restaurants (Lignano Sabbiadoro itself); the greener area of Lignano Pineta, with lovely gardens and lanes for strolling; and Lignano Riviera, the waterfront, rich in salty sea air and coastal pines.

During World War II, the final operations of the German navy – involving the evacuation of troops and personnel from Istria and Trieste ahead the advancing Yugoslavs – took place here in May 1945. An estimated enemy force of 4000 landed from 26 ships of all types at the mouth of the Tagliamento River. Germans equipment included E-boats, LSTs, a small hospital ship, all types of transport, and a variety of weapons. The 21st Battalion of the New Zealand 2nd Division was outnumbered by 20 to one, but at the end, on 4 May 1945, the Germans surrendered. Lignano became an autonomous commune in 1959. Lignano lives on summertime tourism, and is home to Austrian, German, and Slovenian citizens. The latest administrative town elections were held in June 2022 and saw the Center-Right Coalition victorious over the Center-Left civic list.

In the late 2010s to early 2020s the town gained popularity on the Internet because of the satirical YouTube channel Cartoni Morti starring the recurring character of "il Sindaco di Lignano" ("the Mayor of Lignano").

== Terrazza a Mare ==
The Terrazza a Mare ("terrace on the sea" in English) of Lignano Sabbiadoro was designed by the architect Aldo Bernardis in 1969 and opened in 1972. It replaced the previous building designed by the architect Provino Valle. It is considered to be one of the most important monuments of the city housing shops, bars, and a solarium.

== Marina and dock ==
The mooring complex (marina) of Lignano is the largest in Italy and among the largest in Europe, having more than 5,000 berths. The various structures of Aprilia Marittima, the harbour Marina Punta Faro, and the docks Porto Vecchio, Marina Uno, and Marina Punta Verde, are strategically positioned around the peninsula of Lignano, from the Marano lagoon to the river Tagliamento.

== People ==
- Giorgio Scerbanenco (1911–1969), crime writer
- Massimiliano Esposito (1972), football player and beach soccer player

== International relations ==
Lignano Sabbiadoro is twinned with:

- Eisenstadt, Austria
- (United States) Ketchum, US

== See also ==
- Lignano Pineta
- Lignano Riviera
- Stadio G. Teghil
