= Ca' Rezzonico =

Palazzo and art museum in Venice, Italy

Ca' Rezzonico – Museum of 18th-century Venice
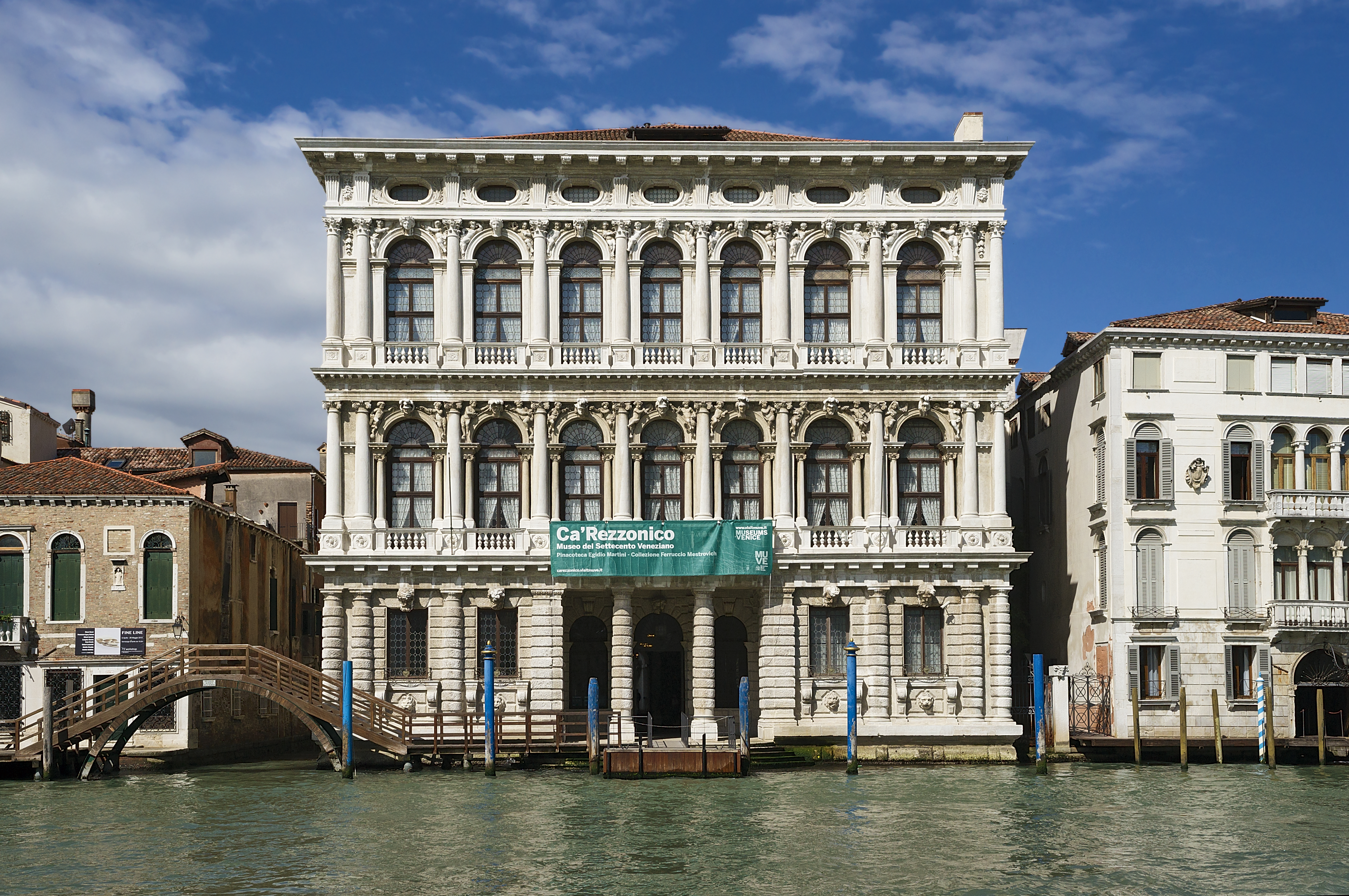
- The white marble façade of Ca' Rezzonico on the Grand Canal
- Click on the map for a fullscreen view
- Established: 25 April 1936
- Location: Dorsoduro 3136, 30123 Venice, Italy
- Coordinates: 45°26′03″N 12°19′28″E
- Type: Art museum, Historic site
- Director: Alberto Craievich
- Website: carezzonico.visitmuve.it

Ca' Rezzonico (Italian pronunciation: [ˈka (r)retˈtsɔːniko]) is a palazzo and art museum on the Grand Canal in the Dorsoduro sestiere of Venice, Italy. It is a particularly notable example of the 18th century Venetian baroque and rococo architecture and interior decoration, and displays paintings by the leading Venetian painters of the period, including Francesco Guardi and Giambattista Tiepolo. It is a public museum dedicated to 18th-century Venice (Museo del Settecento Veneziano) and one of the 11 venues managed by the Fondazione Musei Civici di Venezia. The palazzo was originally designed by the architect Baldassarre Longhena in 1649 for the Bon family.

== History ==
=== Construction (17th-18th centuries) ===
Ca' Rezzonico stands on the right bank of the Grand Canal of Venice, at the point where it is joined by the Rio di San Barnaba. The site was previously occupied by two houses, visible in early paintings of Venice in 1500, which a century and a half later were in a sad state of decay. They belonged to the Bon family, one of Venice's patrician clans. In 1649 the head of the family, Filippo Bon, a Procurator of the city and patron of the arts, decided to transform the two houses into a single large palazzo on the site. For this purpose he employed Baldassarre Longhena (1597-1682), the greatest proponent of Venetian Baroque, a style slowly replacing the Renaissance and Palladian architectural style. Longhena was the designer of the famous dome of the Church of Santa Maria della Salute, a Venice baroque landmark. By 1661 Longhena had combined the two earlier structures, and work had begun on the facade facing the canal, and had reached as high as the first, or Noble, floor. However, neither architect nor client was to see the completion of the Palazzo Bon: Longhena died in 1682, and Filippo Bon saw his finances ruined by the cost of the palazzo. He was forced to halt the work.

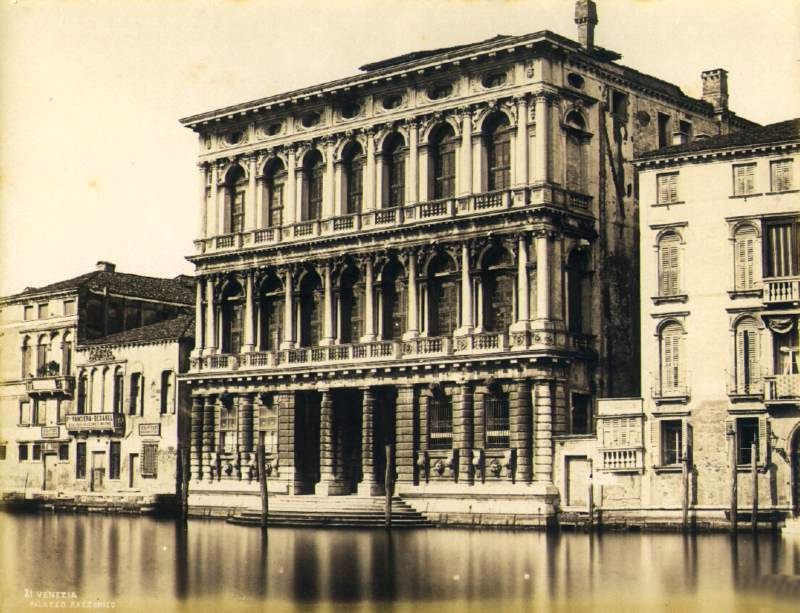
The Palazzo in the mid-19th century, by Carlo Naya

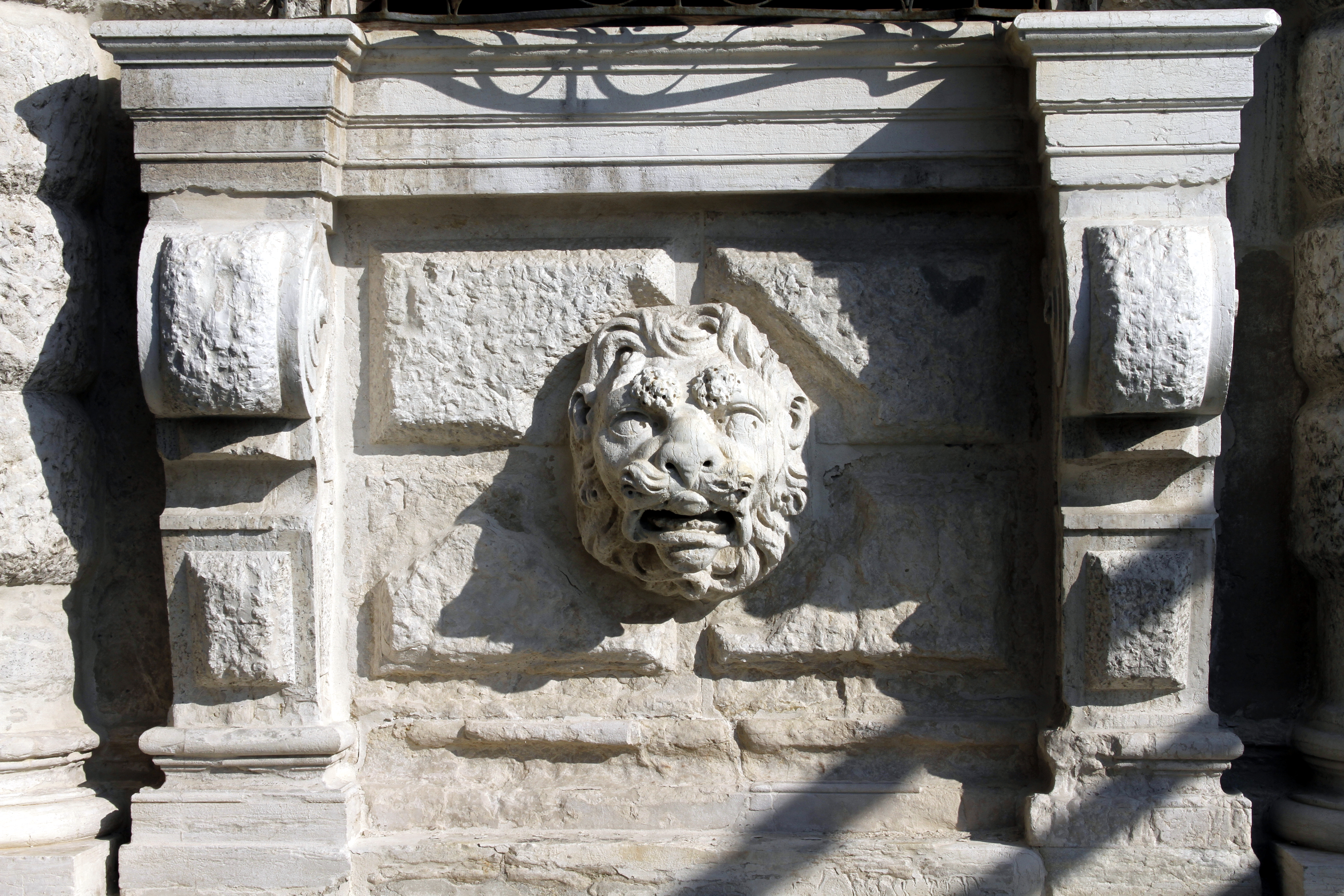
Detail of the facade

Filippo Bon died in 1712, and the unfinished palace, already decaying, was inherited by his sons and then grandsons, but none had the funds to complete the construction. In 1750 The Bons offered the unfinished palazzo to Giambattista Rezzonico, a banker and fabric merchant from Lombardy, whose family had bought a title of Venetian nobility in 1648, during the War of Candia with the Ottoman Empire, when the Venetian state coffers were depleted. Rezzonico paid 60,000 gold ducats for the unfinished building. Municipal inspectors examined the building, and concluded that most of the structure was a ruin, in danger of collapse. Only the rear part of the building, completed up to the second floor, had a roof and could be saved. Rezzonico hired the most prestigious architect of his time, Giorgio Massari (1687-1766), who had built the churches of the Jesuits and the church of the Pietà in Venice, as well as the palazzo of the Grassi family, which faced the Rezzonico palace on the other side of the Grand Canal.

The Rezzonicos rushed the reconstruction along. In 1752, the accidental dropping of a piece of marble caused the scaffolding to collapse, dropping five stonemasons to the ground below. Massari largely followed the original plan of Longhena, but made a number of modifications to suit the lighter rococo tastes. He removed some ponderous double columns on the facade replacing them with more slender pillars, and eliminated a heavy plinth of columns, giving the building a lighter, more graceful appearance. He also installed a row of small oval windows above the larger windows on the second floor, adding light and a rococo touch.

The facade was finished between 1750 and 1752. Turning his attention to the interior, Massari broke with Venetian custom and put the major ceremonial room at the back of the building, not overlooking the canal. He doubled the height of the ceiling in this room and eliminated walls to create a more dramatic space. He laid out a ceremonial route that would take visitors from the dock and gateway on the Grand Canal to a fountain in the interior courtyard, surmounted by the coat of arms of the Rezzonico in marble; then taking a triumphal hallway to the monumental stairway which took them up to the grand salon or ballroom. As soon as the salons were completed, their ceilings were painted with frescoes by Giovanni Battista Crosato and in trompe-l'œil by Girolamo Mengozzi Colonna.

The interior work was nearly finished in 1756. The pinnacle of the Rezzonico's power and the Palazzo's grandeur came in 1758, when Carlo, the younger brother of Giambattista Rezzonico, was elected Pope as Clement XIII, the same year Ludovico Rezzonico married Faustina Savorgnan, uniting the two richest families in Venice. To mark that occasion, Rezzonico commissioned the most celebrated painter of Venice, the aging Giovanni Battista Tiepolo, to paint the ceilings of two salons, along painters with Gaspare Diziani and Jacopo Guarana.

The palace was the site of further celebrations in 1759, when Aurelio Rezzonico was elected Procurator of San Marco, and in 1762, when Ludovico Rezzonico was elected to the same position. For three nights, the facades and interiors of the palace were lit with torches and candles in celebration. Upon his election as Pope, Carlo Rezzonico transferred a large part of the family art collection from Venice to Rome.

=== 19th-20th century- decline and revival ===
Fifty years after the completion of the palace, in 1810, the last member of the Venetian branch of the Rezzonicos, cardinal Abbondio of Pisa, died, bringing an end to the family line. The palace nearly became a Jesuit College, but went instead through several families, and in 1832 to Carlo Pindemonte, the grandson of a Piedomontese poet and political figure, Ippolito Pindemonte. Pindemonte sold all the furnishings and art collections of the palazzo. Only the frescos remained in situ. In 1837, Pindemonte sold the empty building to Count Ladislao Zelinsky, who in turn rented the palazzo to the Baron von Bülow, then to count Zichj Cerner. From 1840 to 1857, it was rented to the Duke of Modena and his family, which included Don Carlo, the Duke of Madrid, the pretender to the Spanish throne.

Beginning in about 1850, the second floor of the palace was rented by the antiquarian and art dealer Jacobo Querci della Rovere, who used it as a gallery to sell paintings by Rubens, Rembrandt, Caravaggio, Canaletto, and other old masters. In the 1880s, it became the home of the painter Robert Barrett Browning, whose father Robert Browning, the poet, died in his apartment on the mezzanine floor in 1889. At this time, the American portrait painter John Singer Sargent also had a studio in the palazzo.

In 1906 Browning received an offer from the German Emperor, Wilhelm II, to buy the building, but sold it instead to Count Lionello von Hierschel de Minerbi, a deputy of the Italian parliament and a collector of modern art. The Palazzo became the setting for spectacular costume balls, celebrations by torchlight and candlelight, and concerts.

American songwriter and composer Cole Porter rented Ca' Rezzonico for $4,000 a month in the 1920s. Porter engaged 50 gondoliers and employed a troupe of high-rope walkers to "perform in a blaze of colored lights".

The global depression of the 1930s brought an end to Minerbi's funds and extravagance, and he sought a buyer for the Palace. After four years of negotiations, in June 1935 the city of Venice purchased the Palazzo and began to transform it into a museum of Venetian art from the 18th century. Works of art of the 18th century, including ceiling frescoes, from other houses and collections owned by the municipality were brought together in the Ca' Rezzonico, to accompany the original frescoes on the ceilings. The city also purchased additional works by Tiepolo, Guardi, Canova, and other artists to augment the collection. The building underwent a major restoration in the late 1970s and was completed in 2001.

== The ground floor and courtyard ==
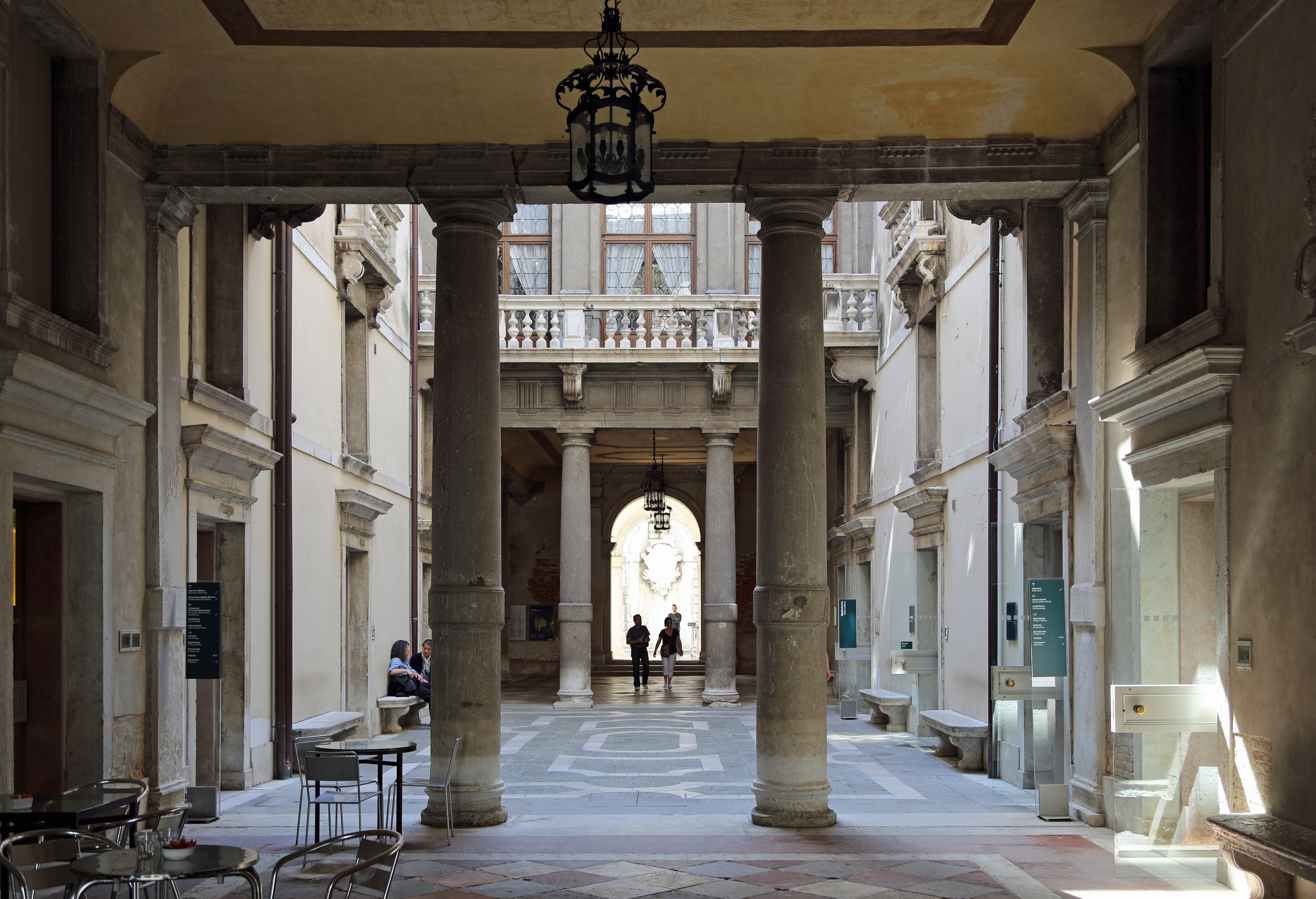
Ground floor passage from the Grand Canal to the inner courtyard and fountain

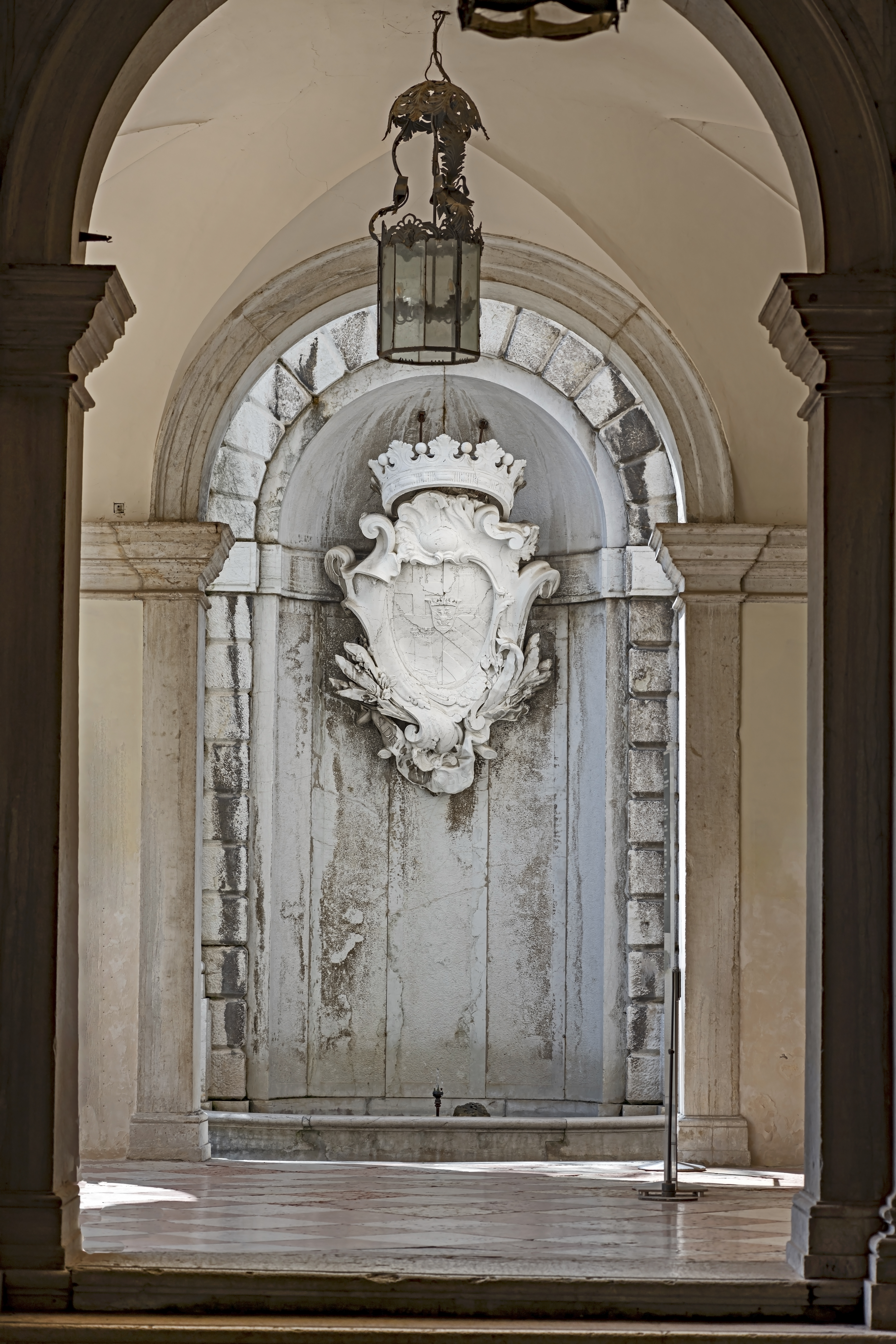
Fountain in courtyard with Rezzonico coat of arms

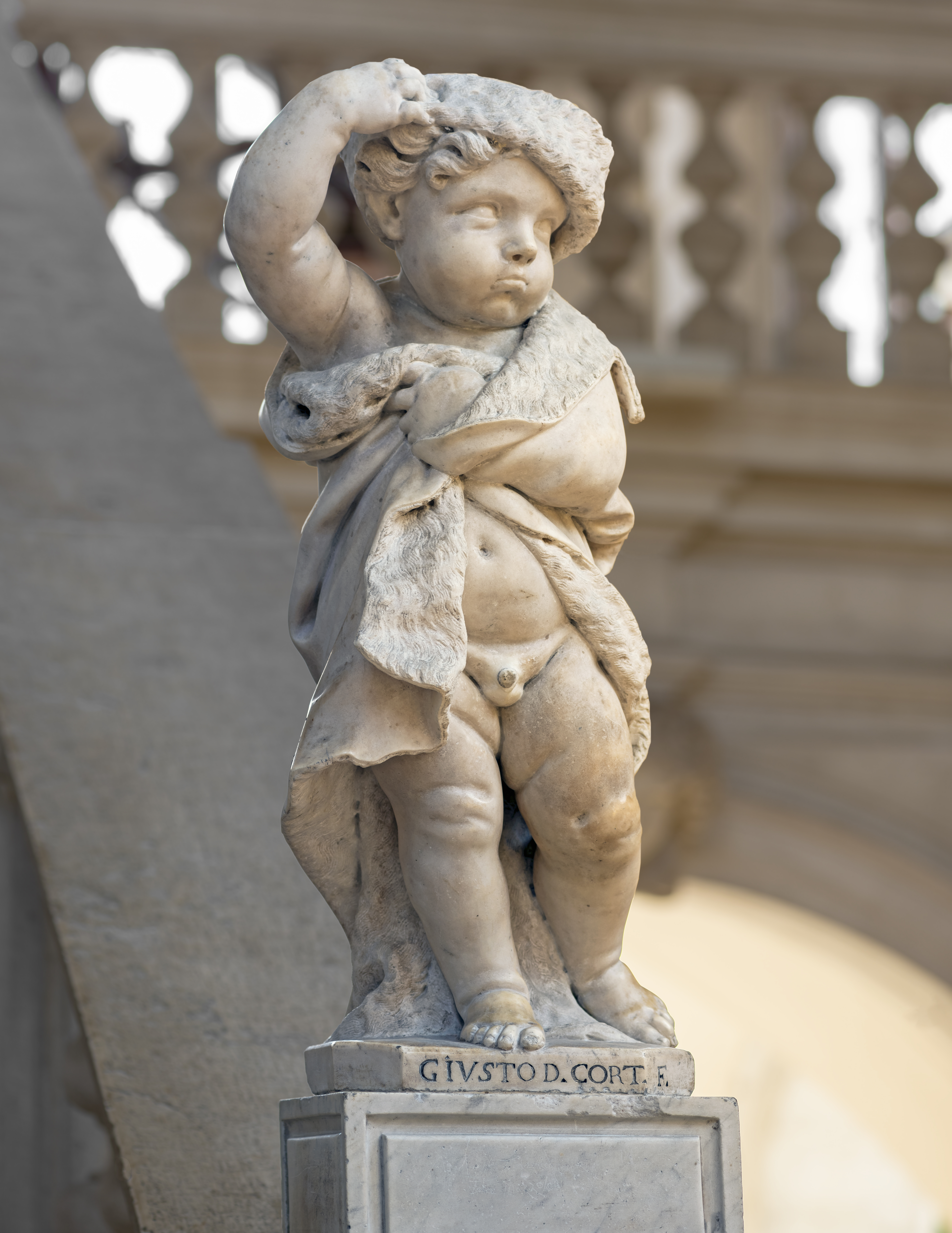
Grand stairway - Winter by Giusto Le Court

Visitors typically arrived by gondola at the main entrance, opening onto the Grand Canal. The building is narrow and deep, with the facade on the canal only three rooms wide. Visitors passed through the entrance, and down a long corridor to the courtyard, where a fountain is placed, with the coat of arms of the Rezzonico family. The entrance to the streets of Venice is behind the fountain. From the ground floor, visitors climb to the Piano Nobile by the staircase of honour, which has marble balustrades decorated with statuary by Giusto Le Court. Le Court was the leading sculptor in Venice in the late 17th century, and worked closely on many projects with the first architect of the building, Longhena.

== Piano Nobile ==
The Palazzo's ceremonial rooms are located on the piano nobile. The largest and most impressive is the grand salon or ballroom, fourteen by twenty-four meters in size, at the rear of the building. This room, created by Massari, is of double height, and appears even higher because of the trompe-l'œil architecture painted on the walls and ceiling by Girolamo Mengozzi Colonna (not by Pietro Visconti, as long believed). The centerpiece of the ceiling, painted by Giovanni Battista Crosato, depicts Apollo riding his carriage between Europe, Asia, Africa and the Americas. The coat of arms of the Rezzonico family, with a double-headed eagle, also is prominently displayed on the wall of the ballroom facing the entry door. The two enormous chandeliers made of wood and gilded metal, from the mid-18th century, are among the few fixtures that date to the original period of the building. The ballroom is now decorated with 18th century statues by Andrea Brustolon, including a statue of an Ethiopian warrior carved of ebony.

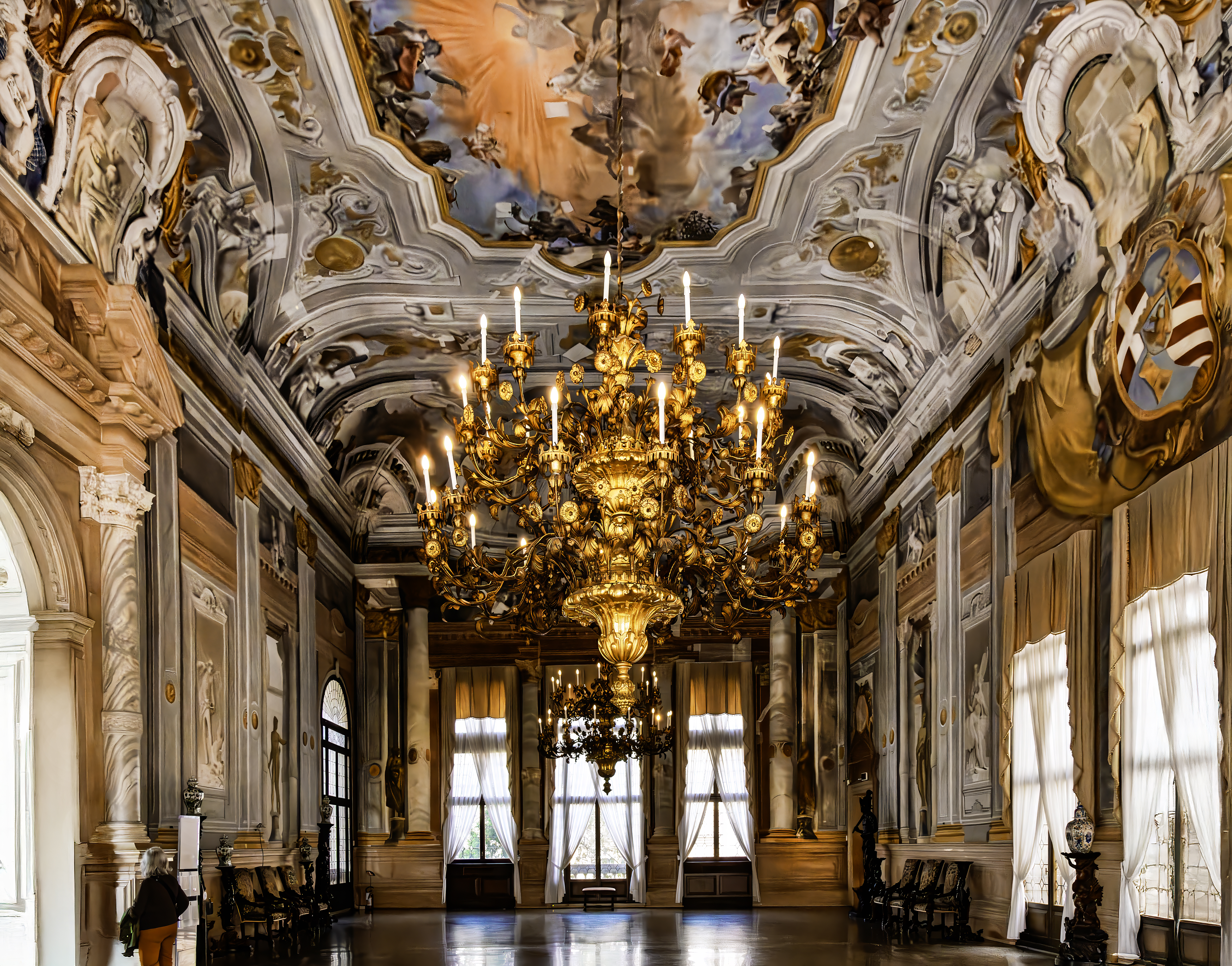
The ballroom, the largest room in the Ca' Rezzonico

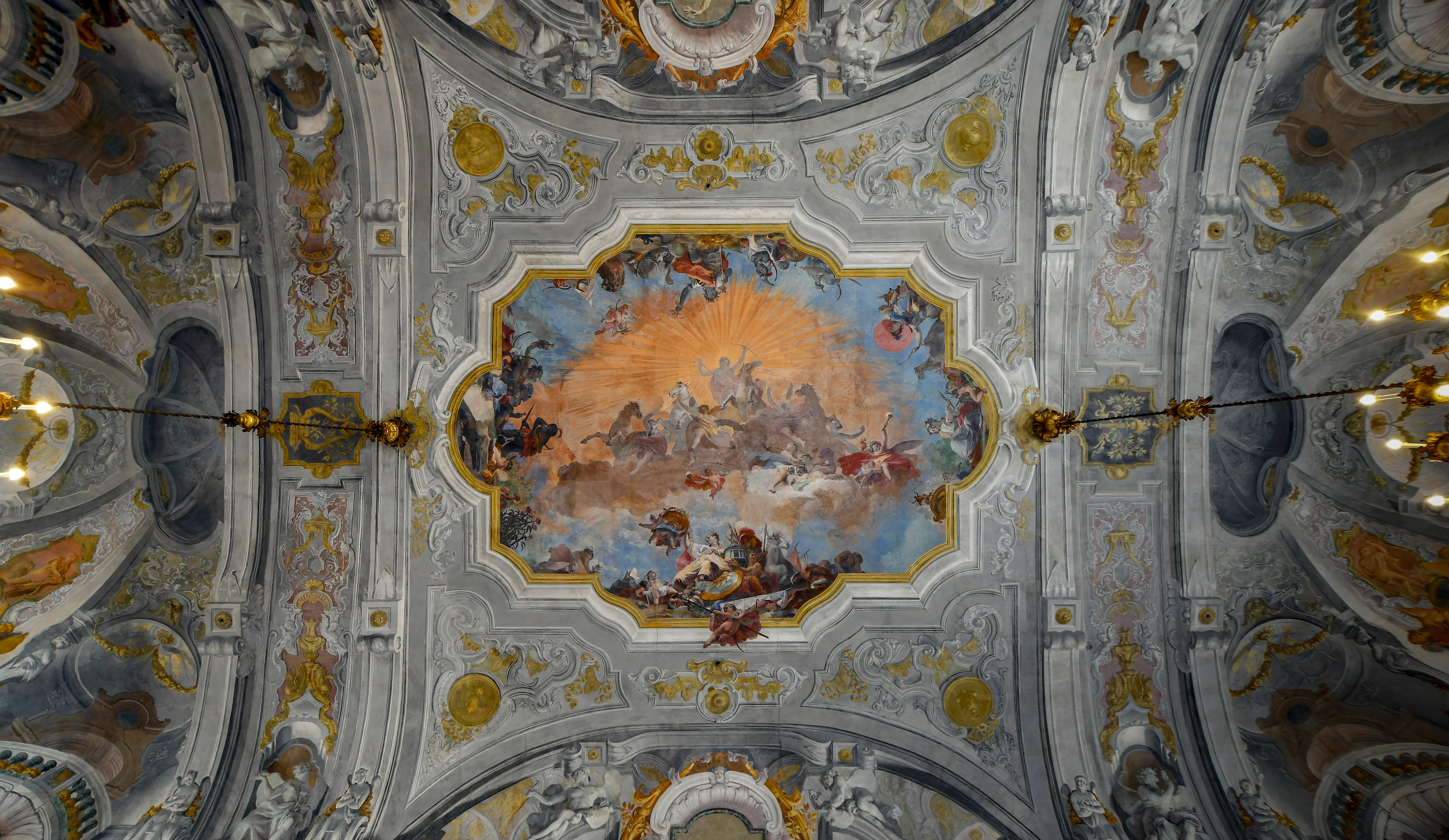
The Chariot of Apollo fresco on the ceiling of the ballroom, by Giovanni Battista Crosato (1753)

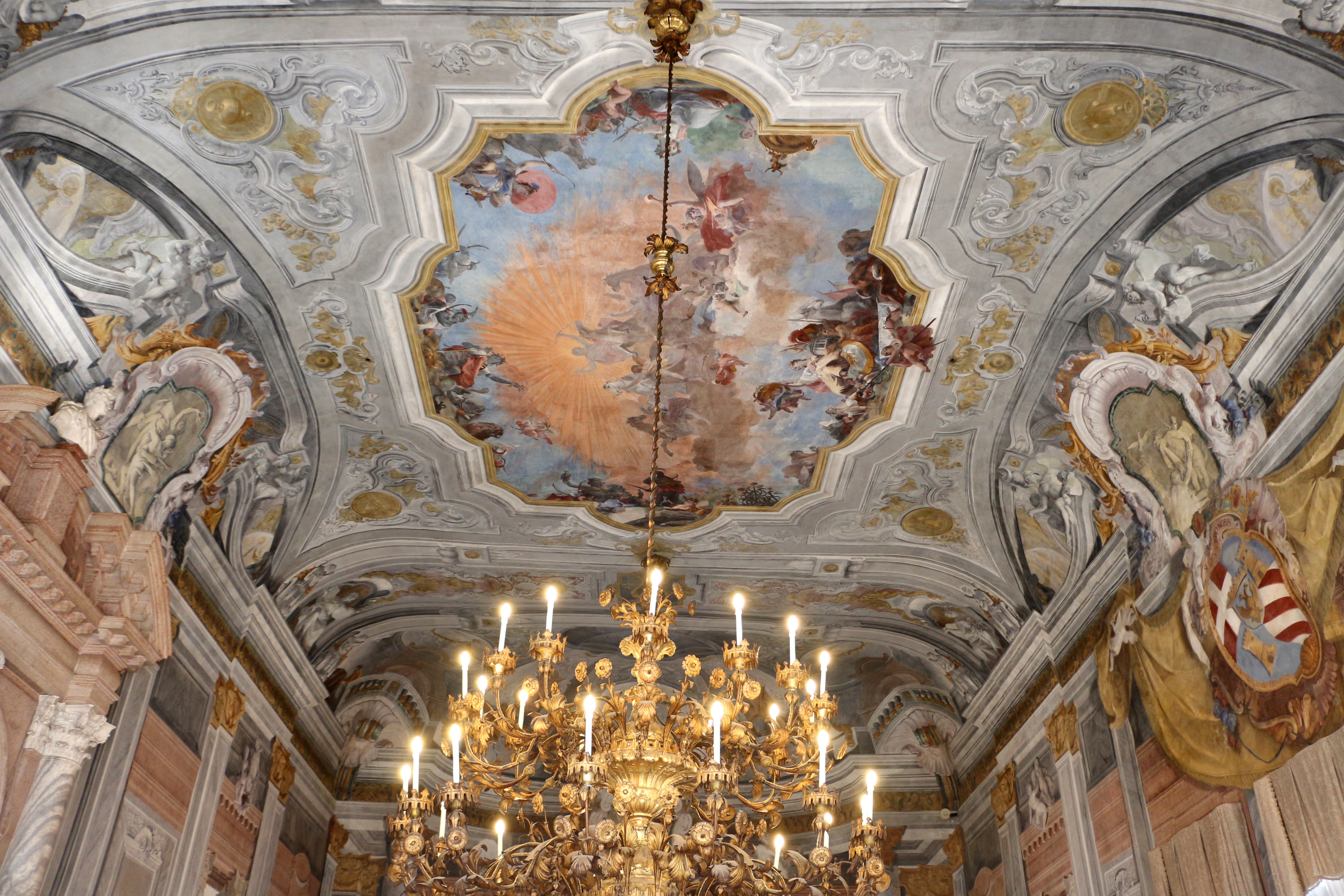
Trompe-l'œil decoration of the ballroom ceiling by Girolamo Mengozzi Colonna

The Salon of the Allegory, a room decorated to commemorate the 1758 marriage of Ludovico Rezzonico, the nephew of Pope Clement XIII Rezzonico, and future procurator of San Marco, to Faustina Savorgnan, is also on the Piano Nobile. The ceiling has a large fresco by Giambattista Tiepolo and his son, Giandomenico Tiepolo, depicting the groom and his bride ferried by Apollo's chariot. It was one of the last works of Tiepolo in Venice, before his departure for Madrid in 1762. Tiepolo completed the work on the ceiling in only twelve days on the scaffolding. The Tiepolo fresco, like the paintings in the Grand salon, is framed by trompe-l'œil paintings of architecture, including a false balustrade, by Girolamo Mengozzi Colonna, who also did the painted frames in the Grand Salon. The painting depicts the bridal couple in a chariot, being led by the sun god, Apollo. Other allegorical figures include cupid blindfold, a flight of putti and doves, the figure of Fame, holding a trumpet; the three graces on a cloud; a bearded old man with a laurel crown symbolizing Merit; and a lion, the symbol of Venice, along with coats of arms of the two families.

The furnishings of the salon included paintings and furnishings by Italian artists of the first half and mid-18th century, including portrait of Pope Clement XIII Rezzonico by Anton Raphael Mengs, a retable by Francesco Zugno, a pupil of Tiepolo, and a prie-dieu of carved walnut illustrating the fantasy of the Italian rococo style.

A passage from the Salon leads to a small chapel, suspended over the Rio San Barnaba. The chapel was built by either Aurelio Rezzonico or Cardinal Rezzonico, the nephew of Pope Clement XIII, in the second half of the 18th century. Some of the original decoration remains, including the sculpted and gilded rococo stucco sculpture on the white walls, and a retable, The Virgin and Saints, by a pupil of Tiepolo, Francesco Zugno, and prie-dieu, or seat for kneeling and praying, in the twisting and turning Venetian rococo style.

Wedding couple in chariot on the ceiling of the Salon of the Allegory, by Giambattista Tiepolo (1758)

Francesco Falier by Bernardino Castelli

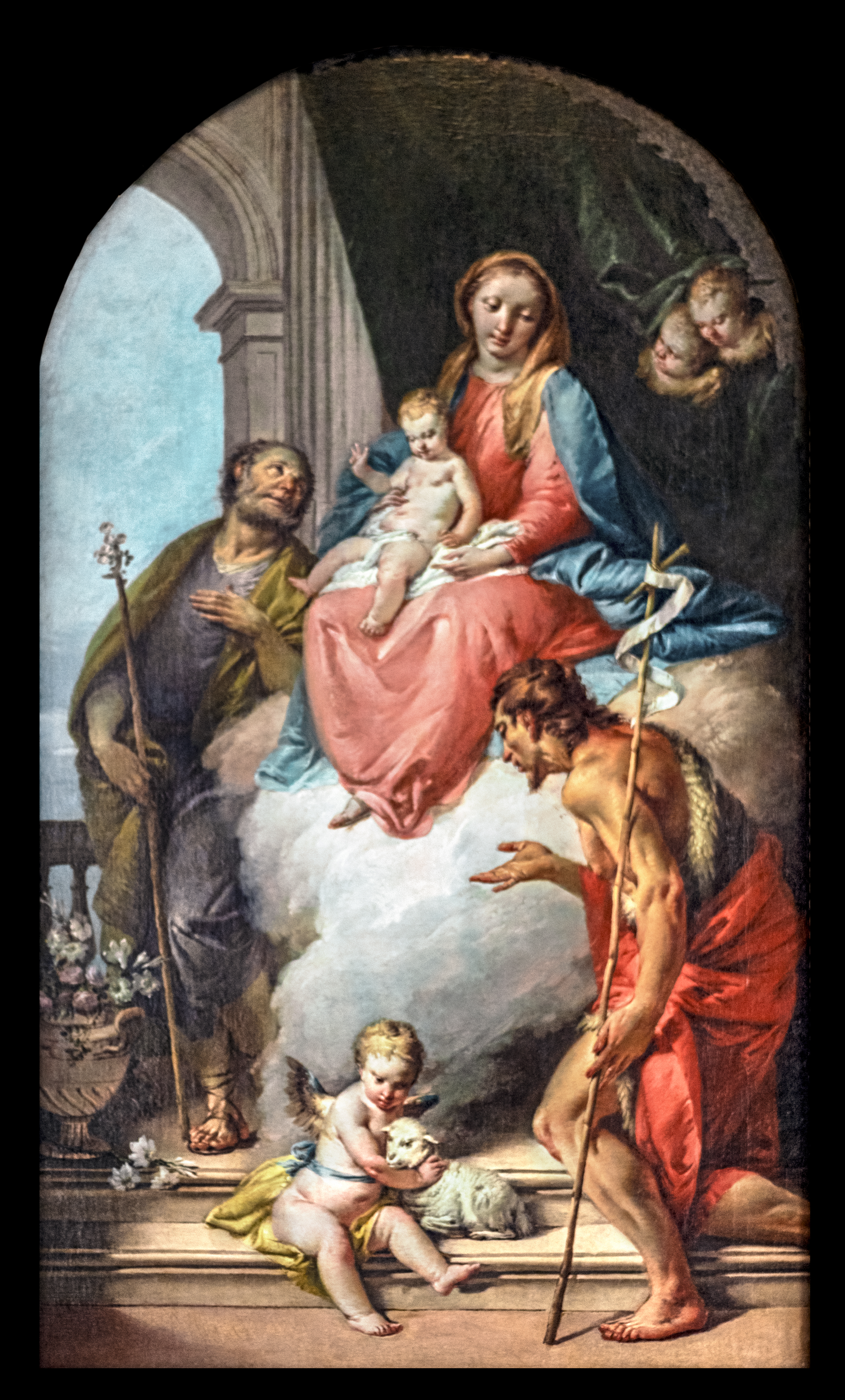
The holy family and St. John the Baptist, by Francesco Zugno

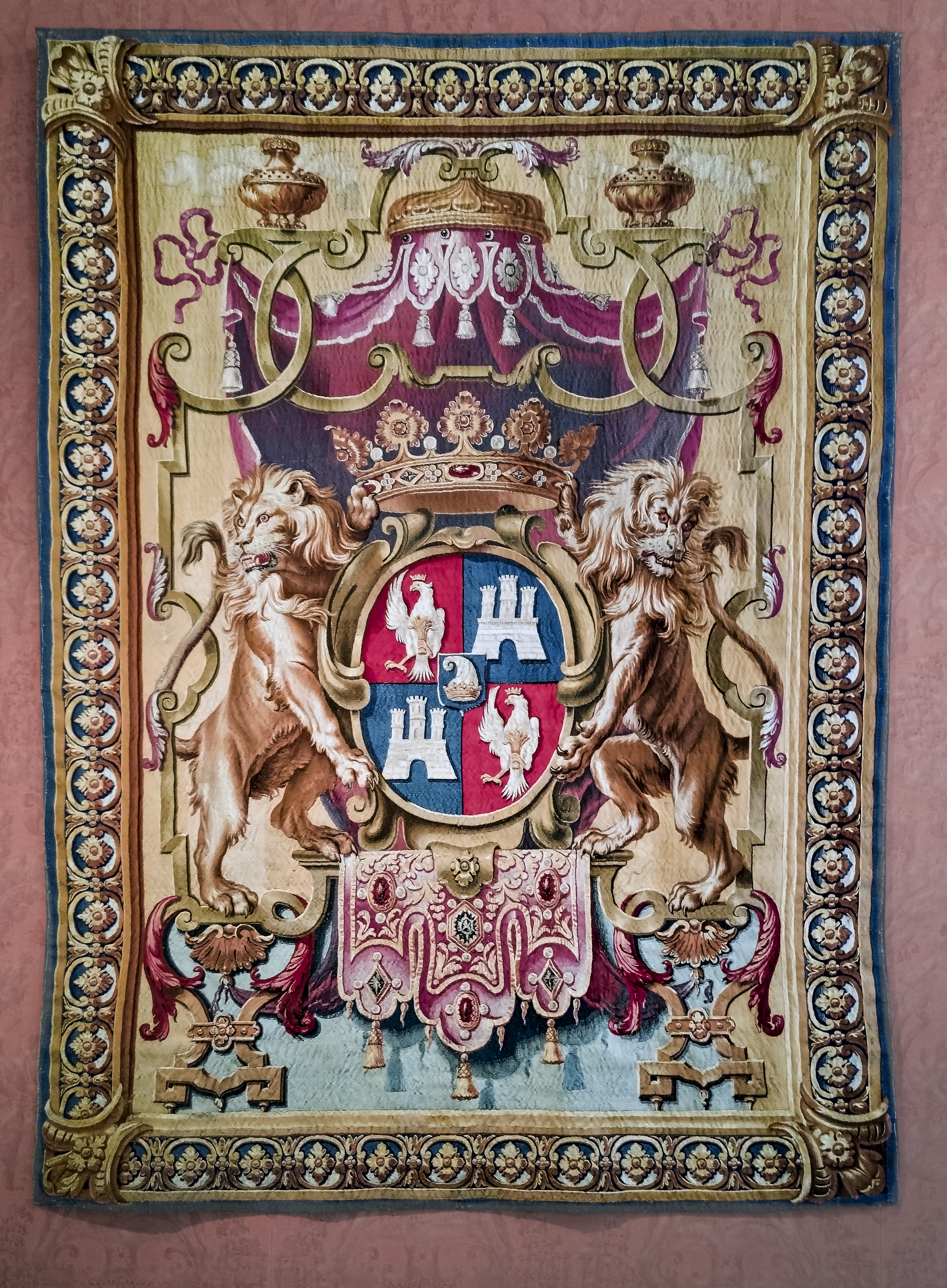
Tapestry with arms of the Tiepolo family

=== The Salon of Pastels ===
was originally a room for holding audiences; in that room the Papal Legate informed Cardinal Rezzonico that he had been elected Pope the day before. The ceiling is decorated with frescos depicting the Triumph of the Arts over Ignorance, presented in a trompe-l'œil painted frame, with allegorical scenes painted in the corners. The paintings, particularly The Triumph of Poetry, date from the time when Tiepolo was working in the main salon, and are usually attributed to either Giambattista Crosato or Gaspare Diziani of Belluno. The room takes its name from the number of pastel portraits by Rosalba Carriera and other notable Venetian artists. They include a fine pastel portrait of the opera singer Faustina Bordoni by Carriera. Another notable pastel portrait is that of Cecilia Guardi Tiepolo, wife of the painter Tiepolo, painted by her son Lorenzo. It was painted in 1757.

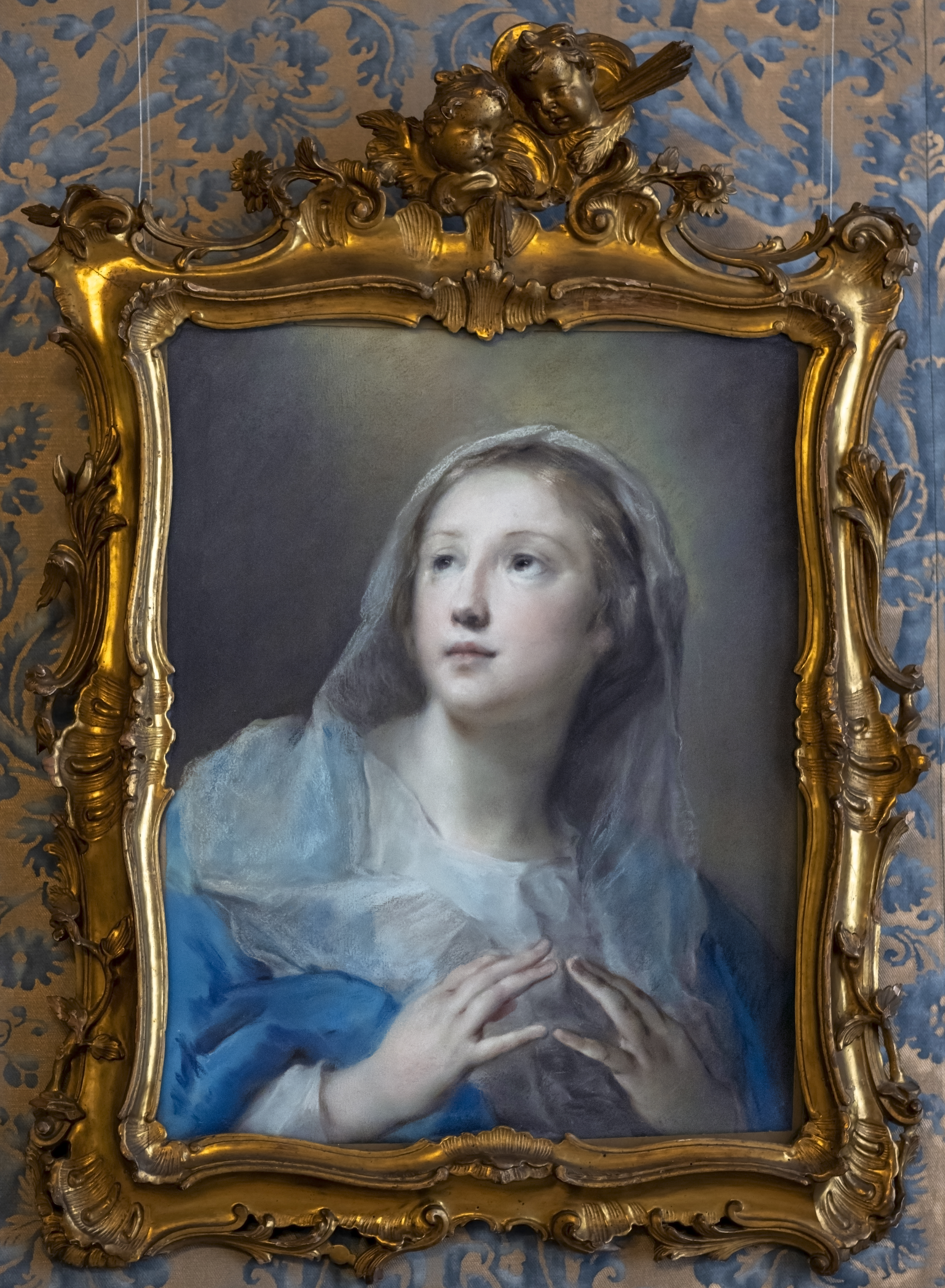
Madonna orante - Rosalba Carriera

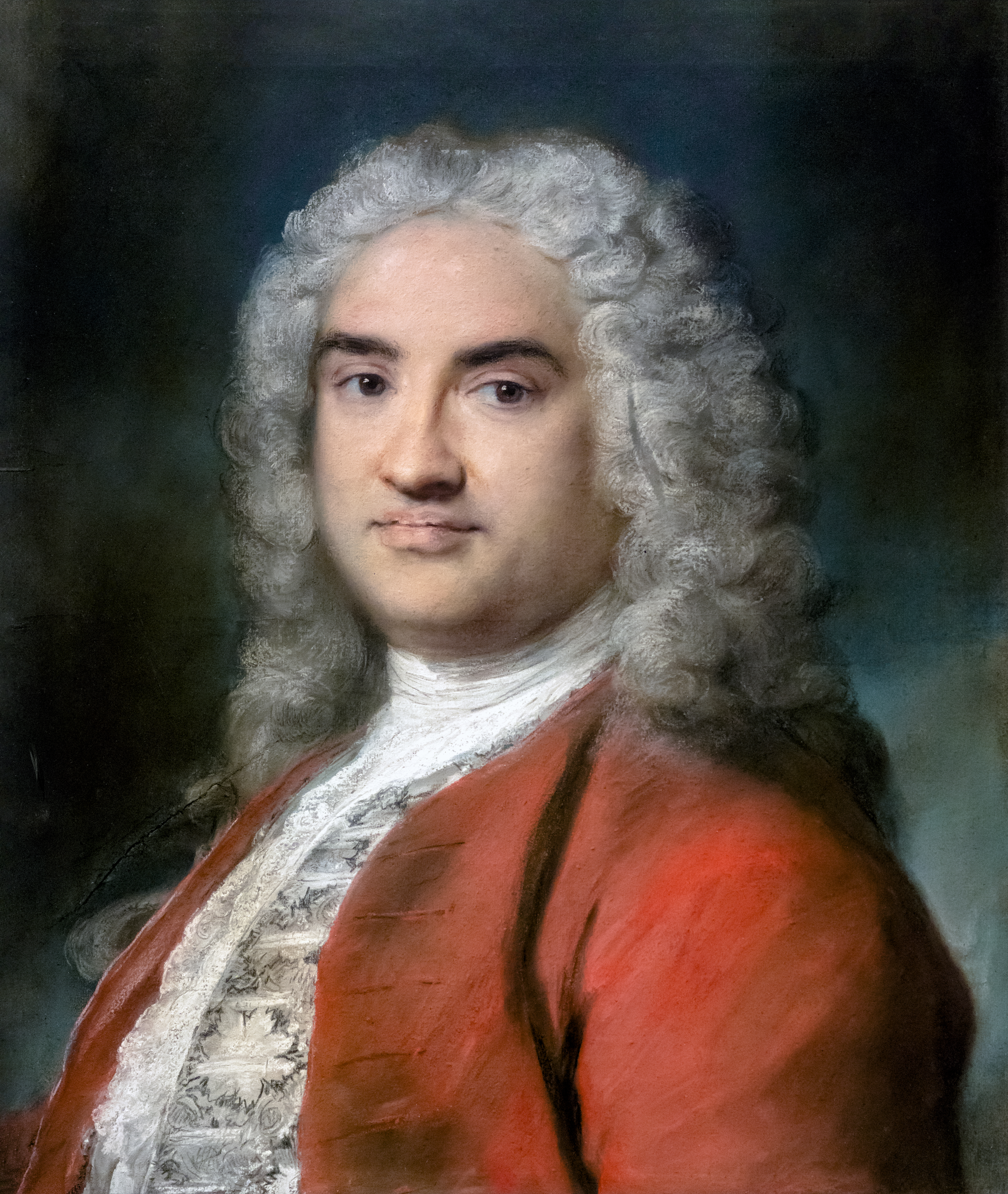
Ritratto di gentiluomo in rosso- Rosalba Carriera

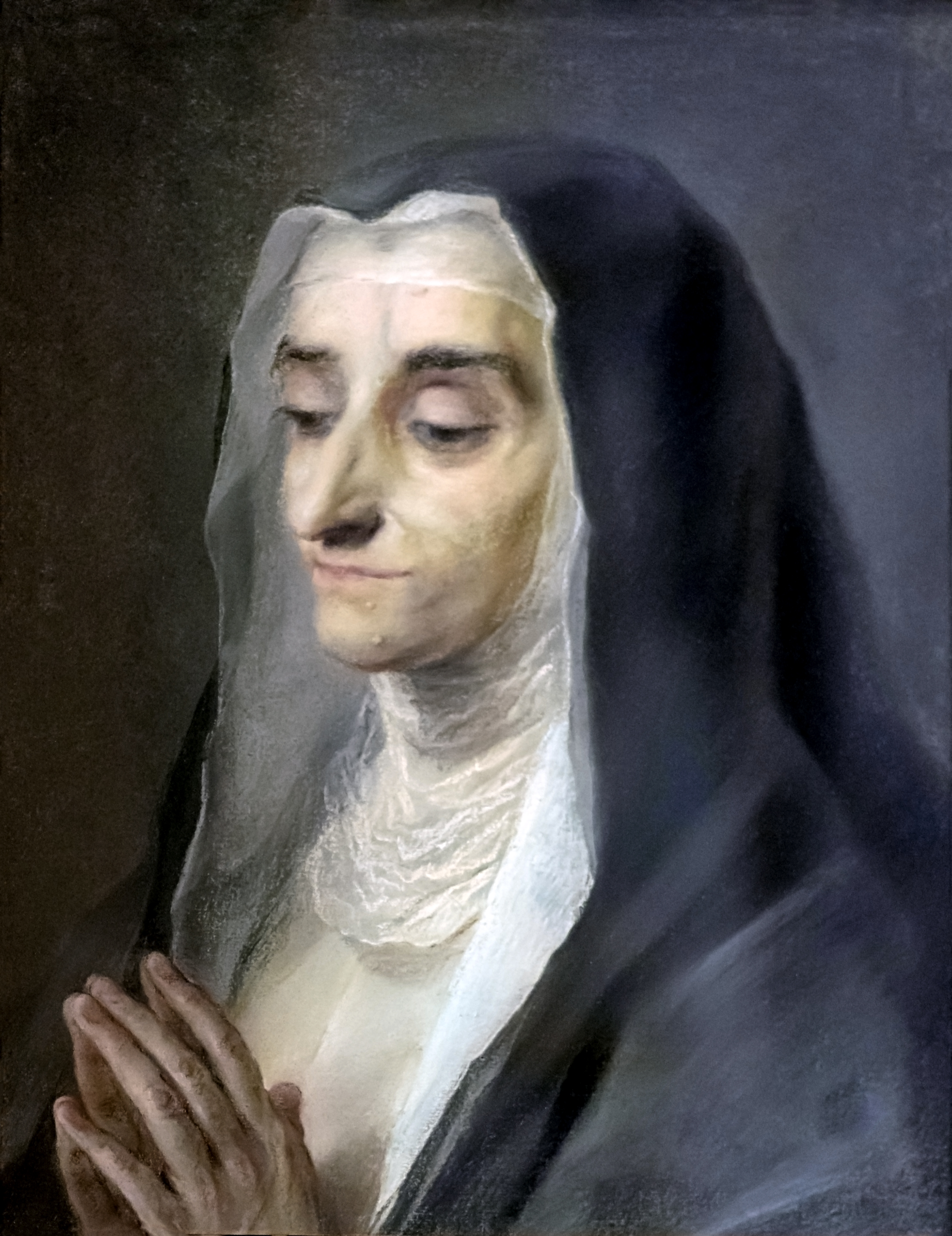
Suor Maria Caterina Puppi - Rosalba Carriera

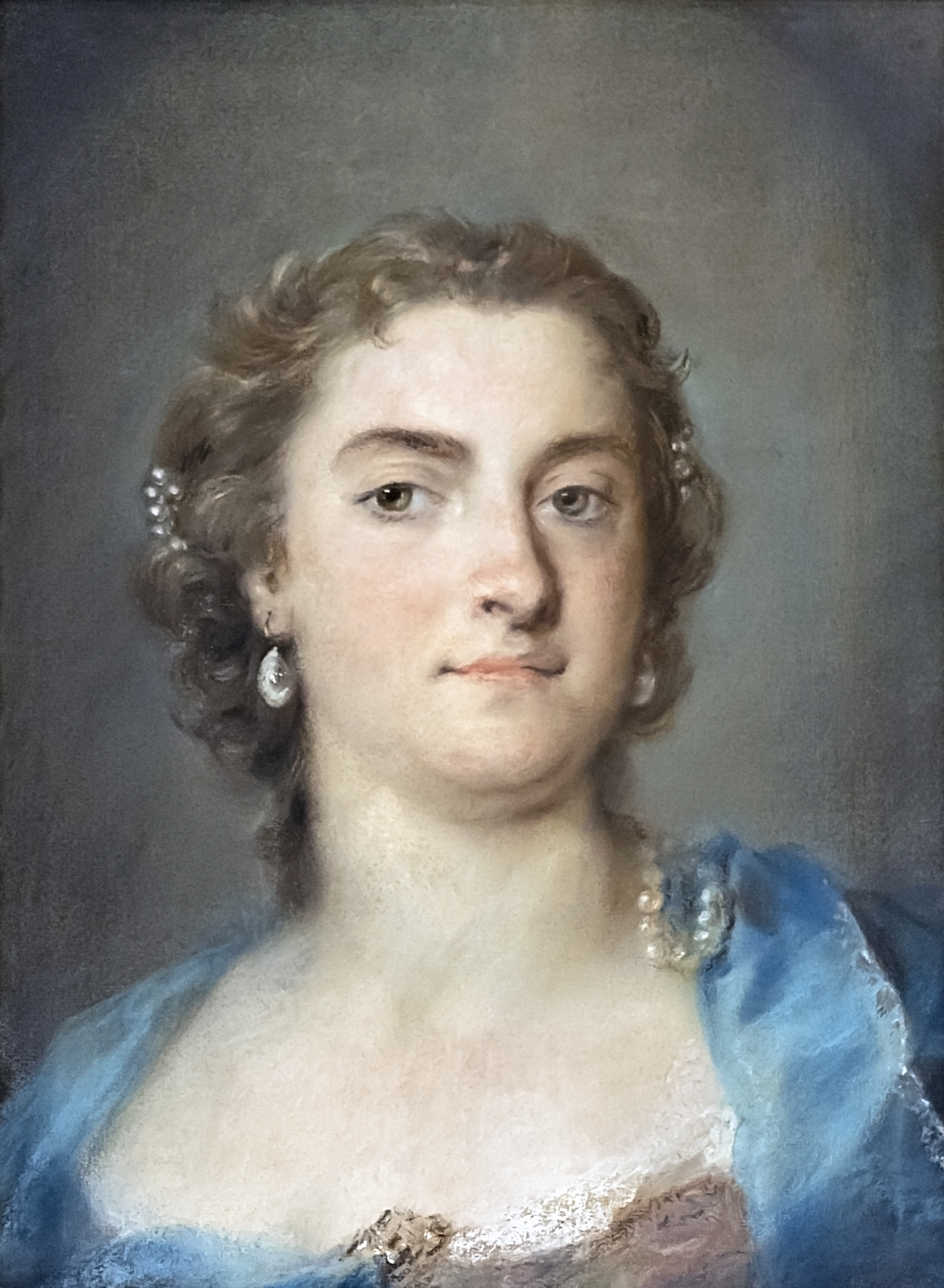
Faustina Bordoni - Rosalba Carriera

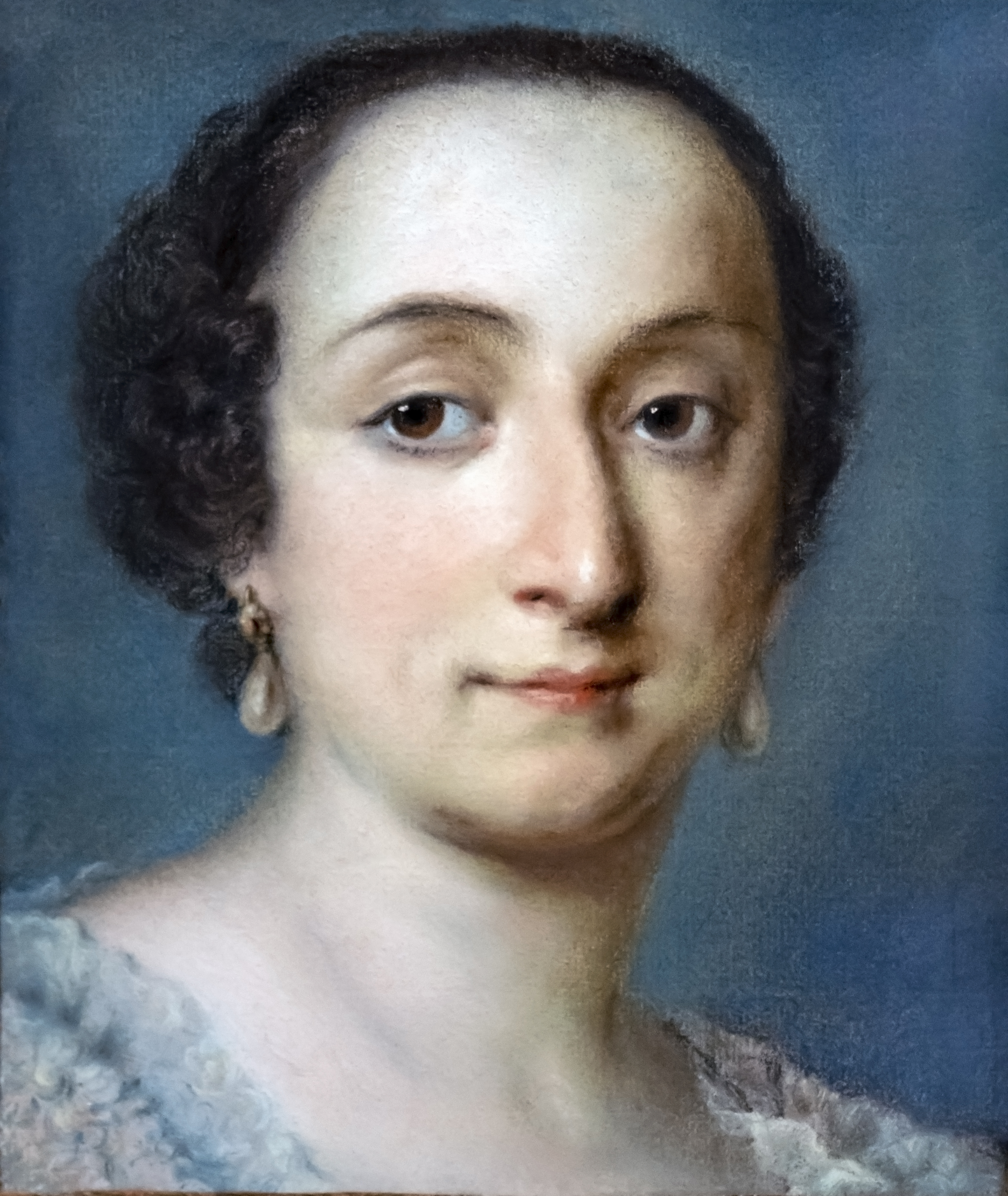
Lucietta Sartori - Rosalba Carriera

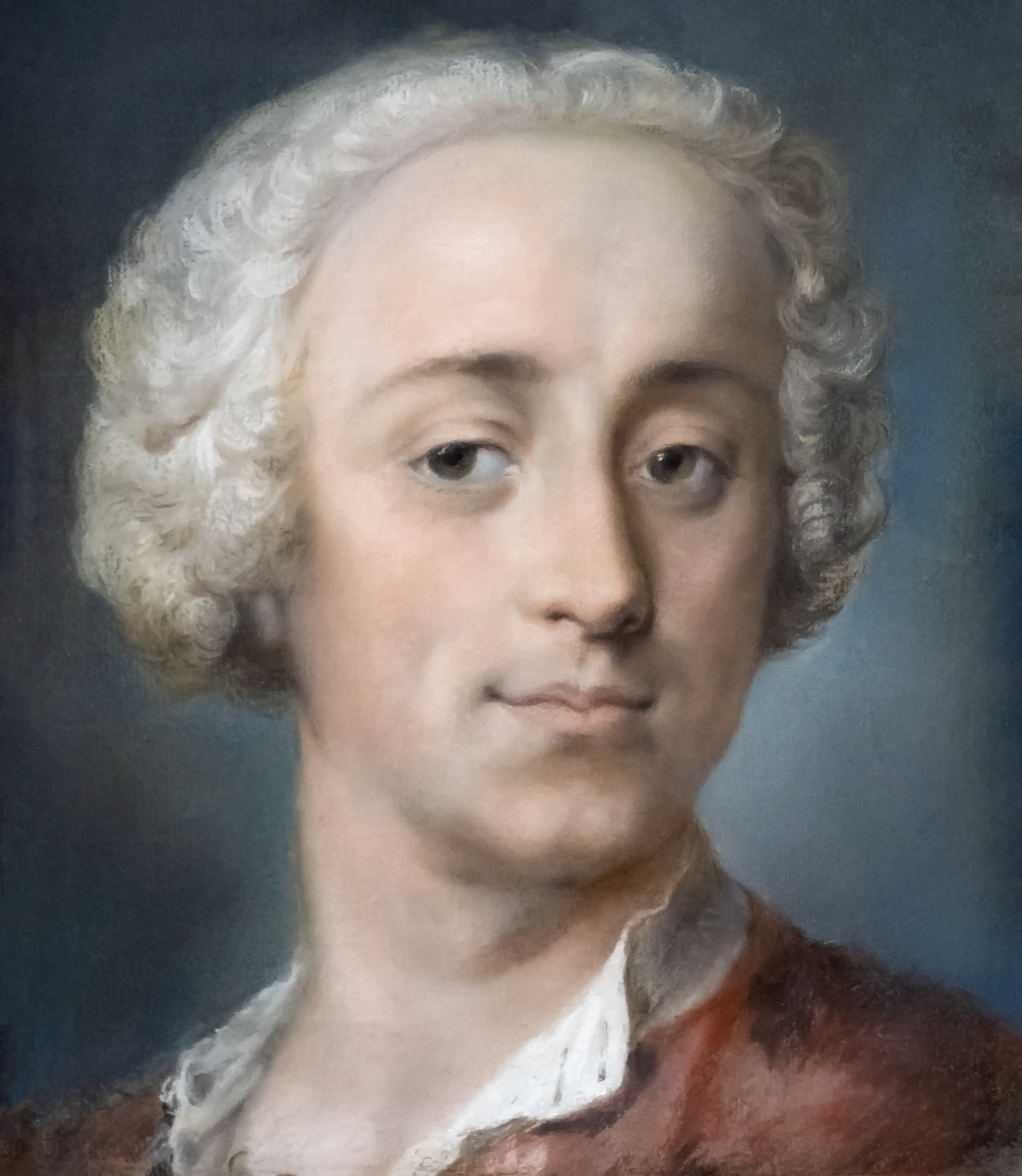
Giambattista Sartori - Rosalba Carriera

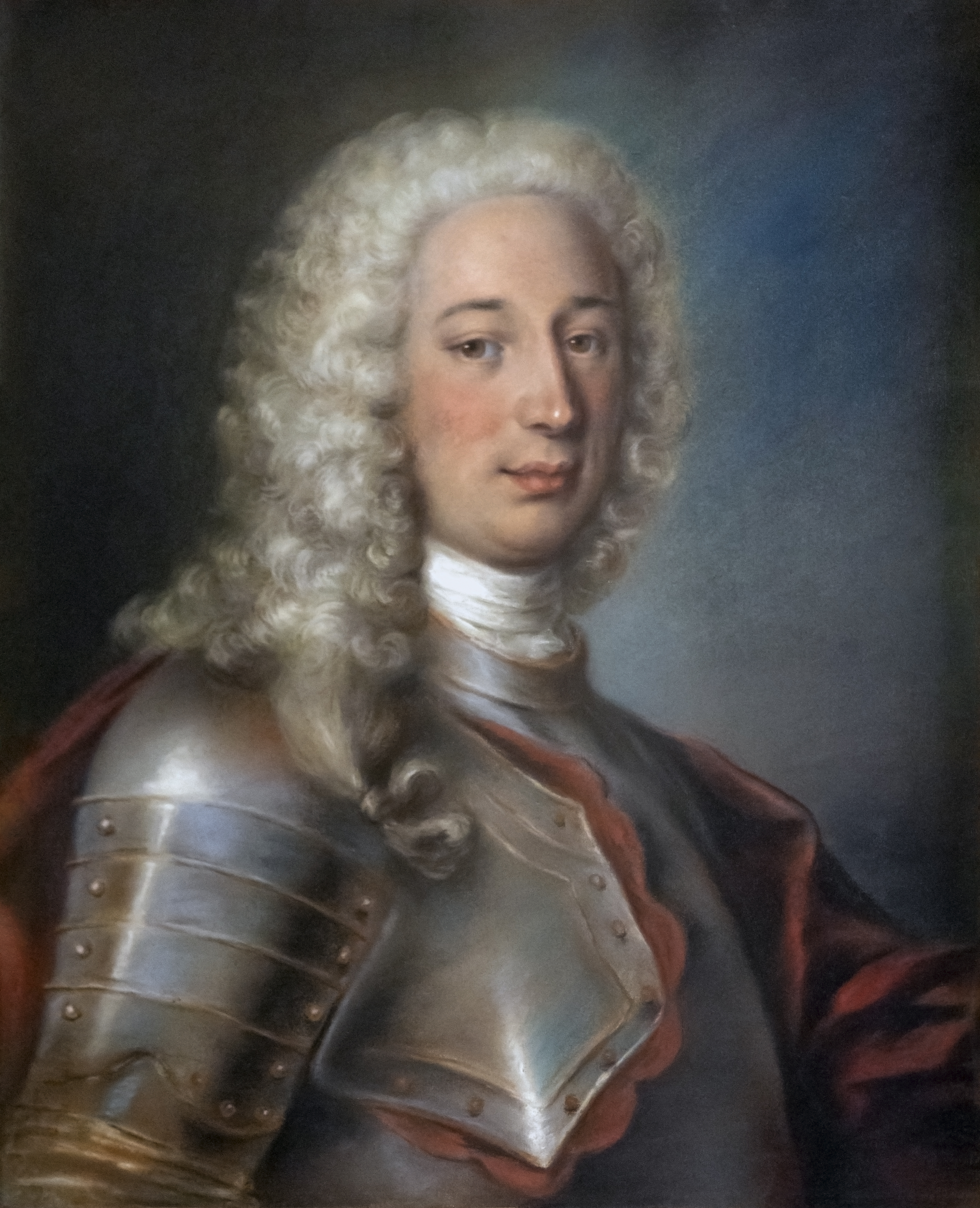
Gerolamo Maria Balbi - Marianna Carlevaris

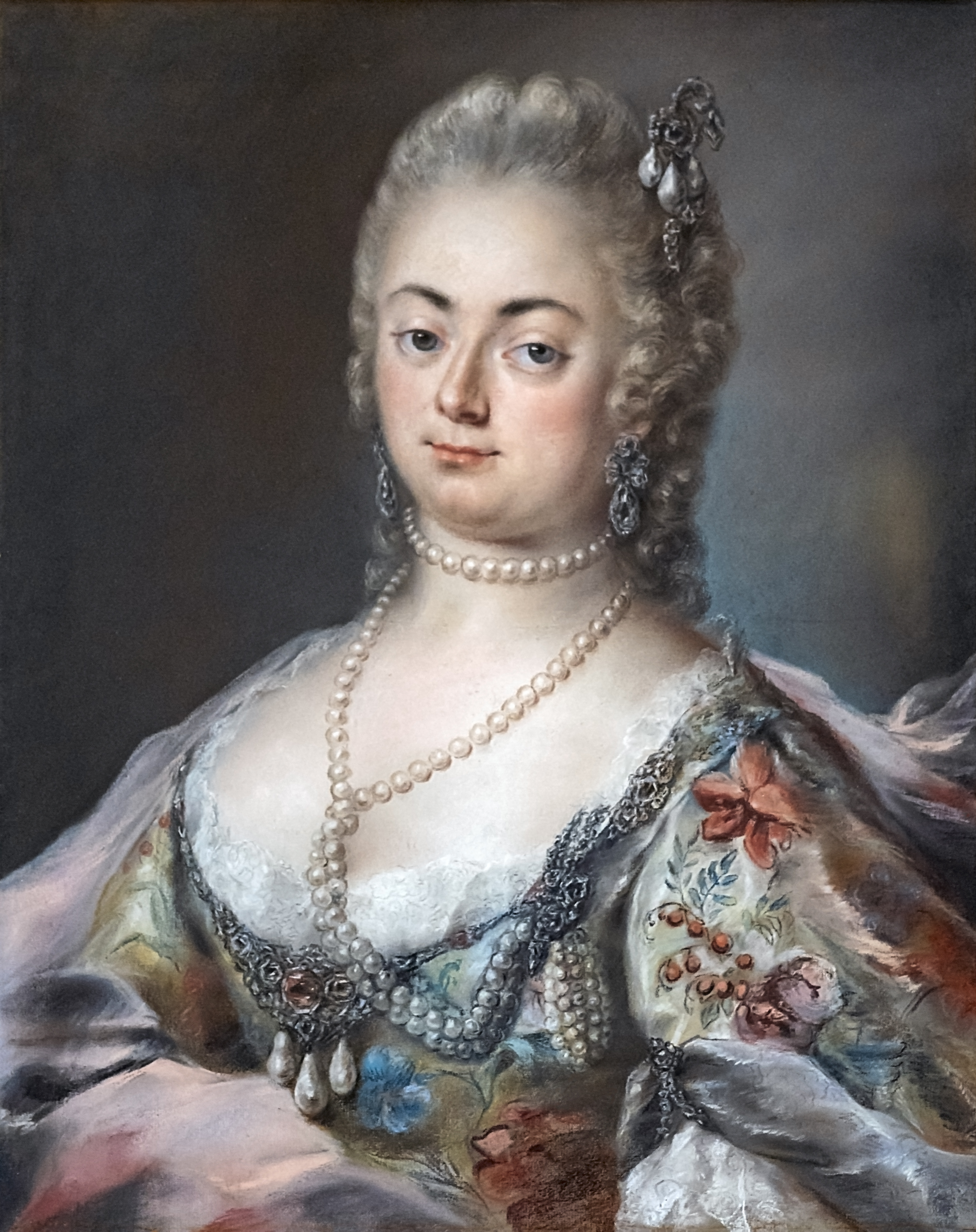
Cornelia Foscolo Balbi - Marianna Carlevaris

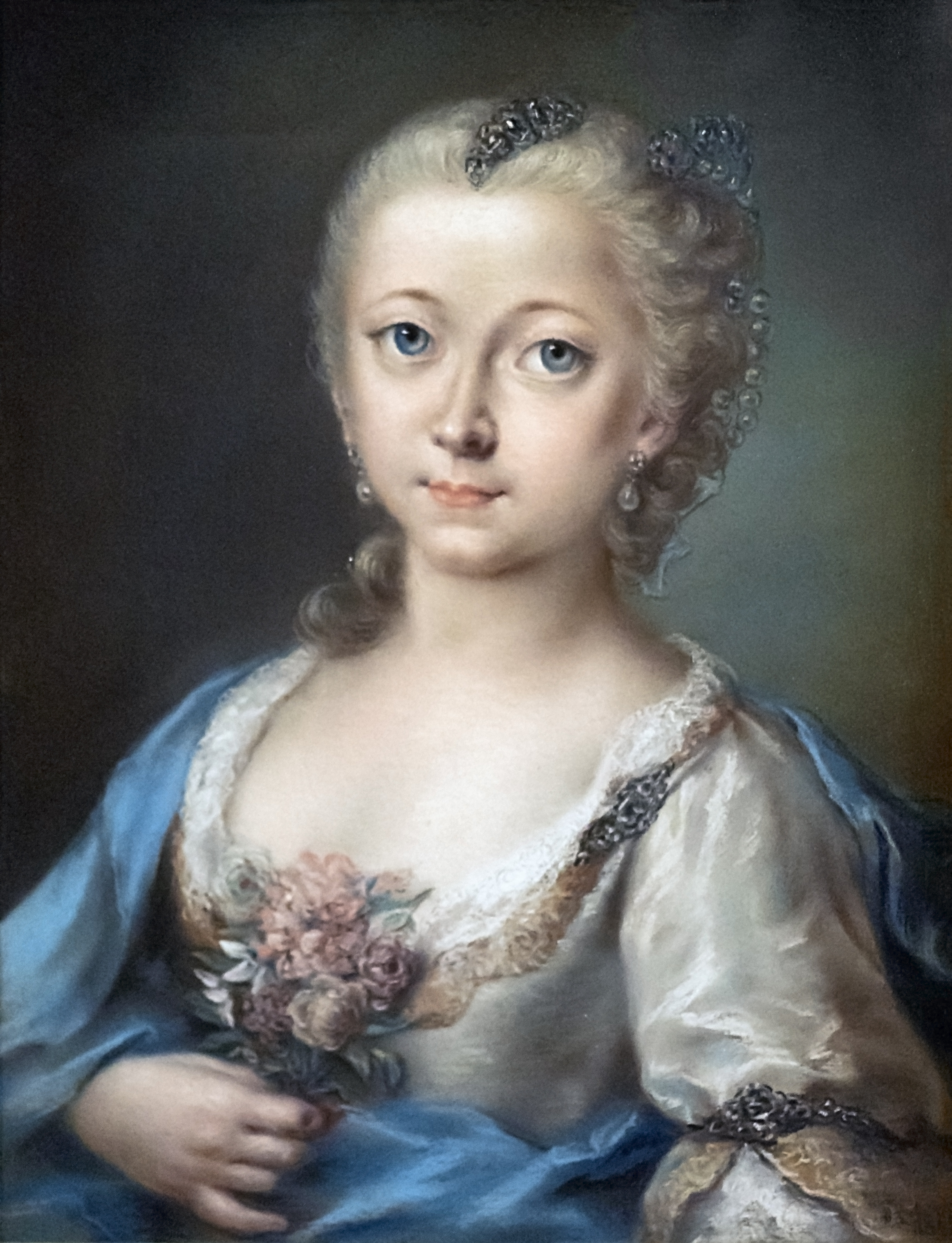
Caterina Balbi - Marianna Carlevaris

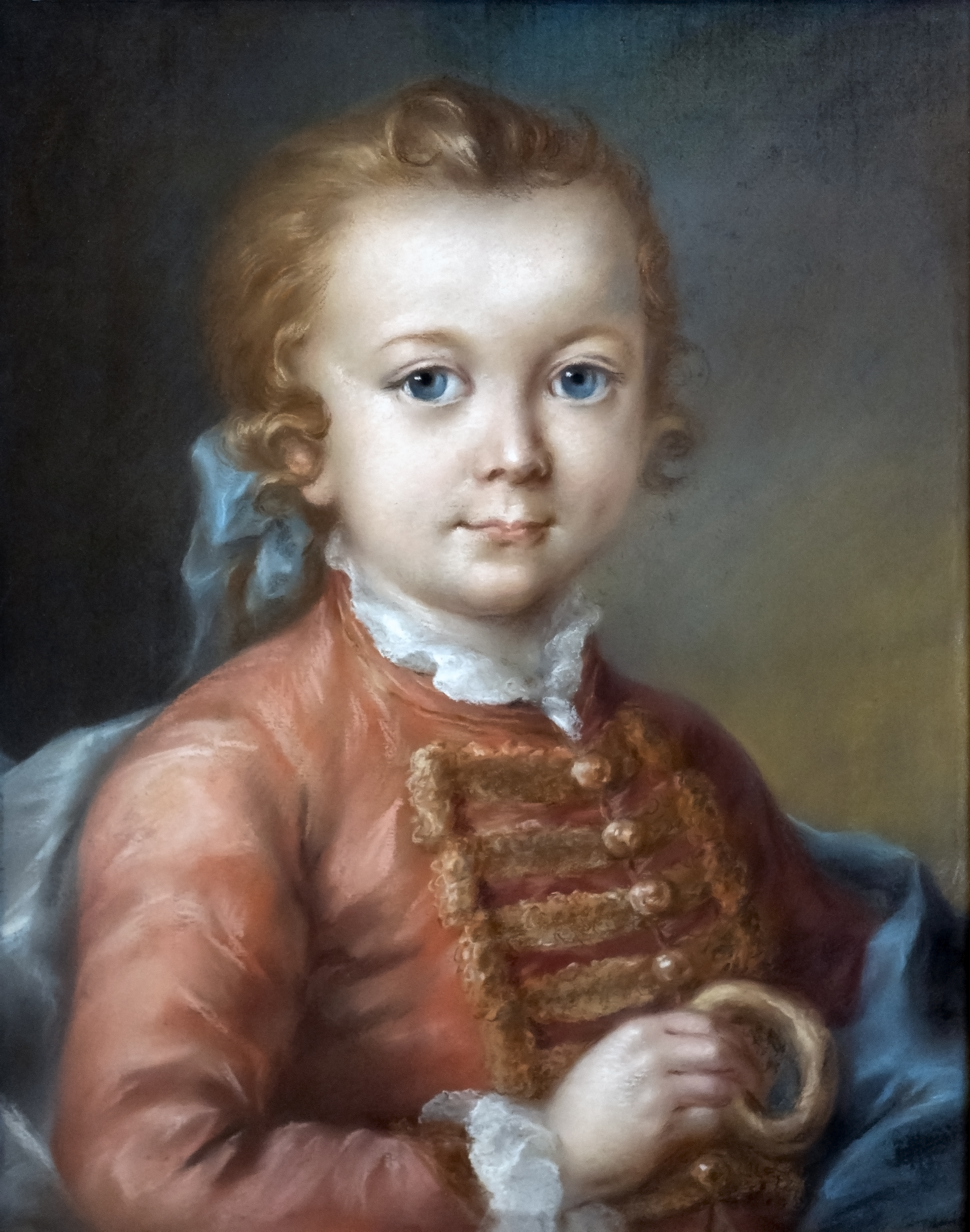
Marco Balbi - Marianna Carlevaris

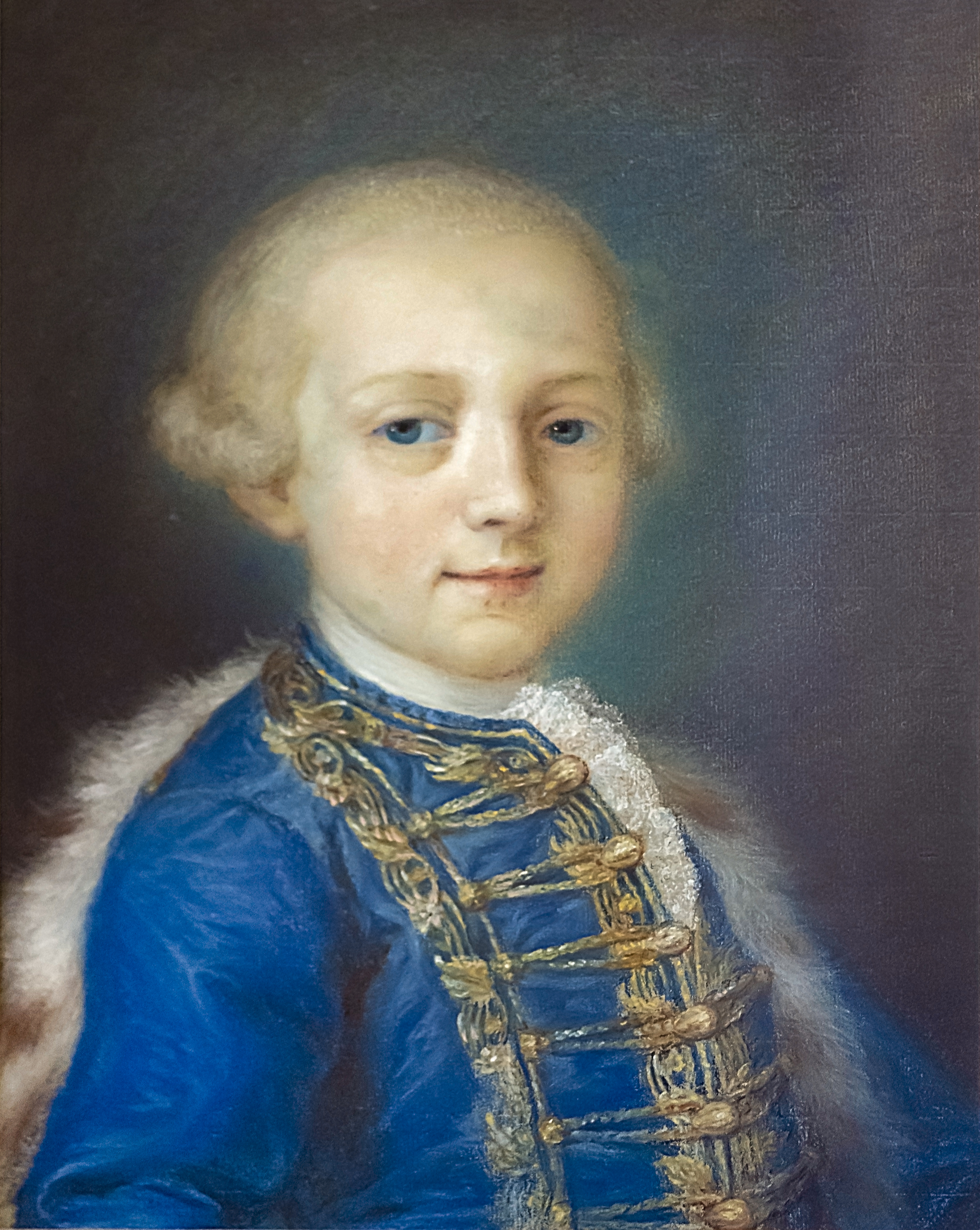
Ritratto di un bambino nobile - Gian Antonio Lazzari

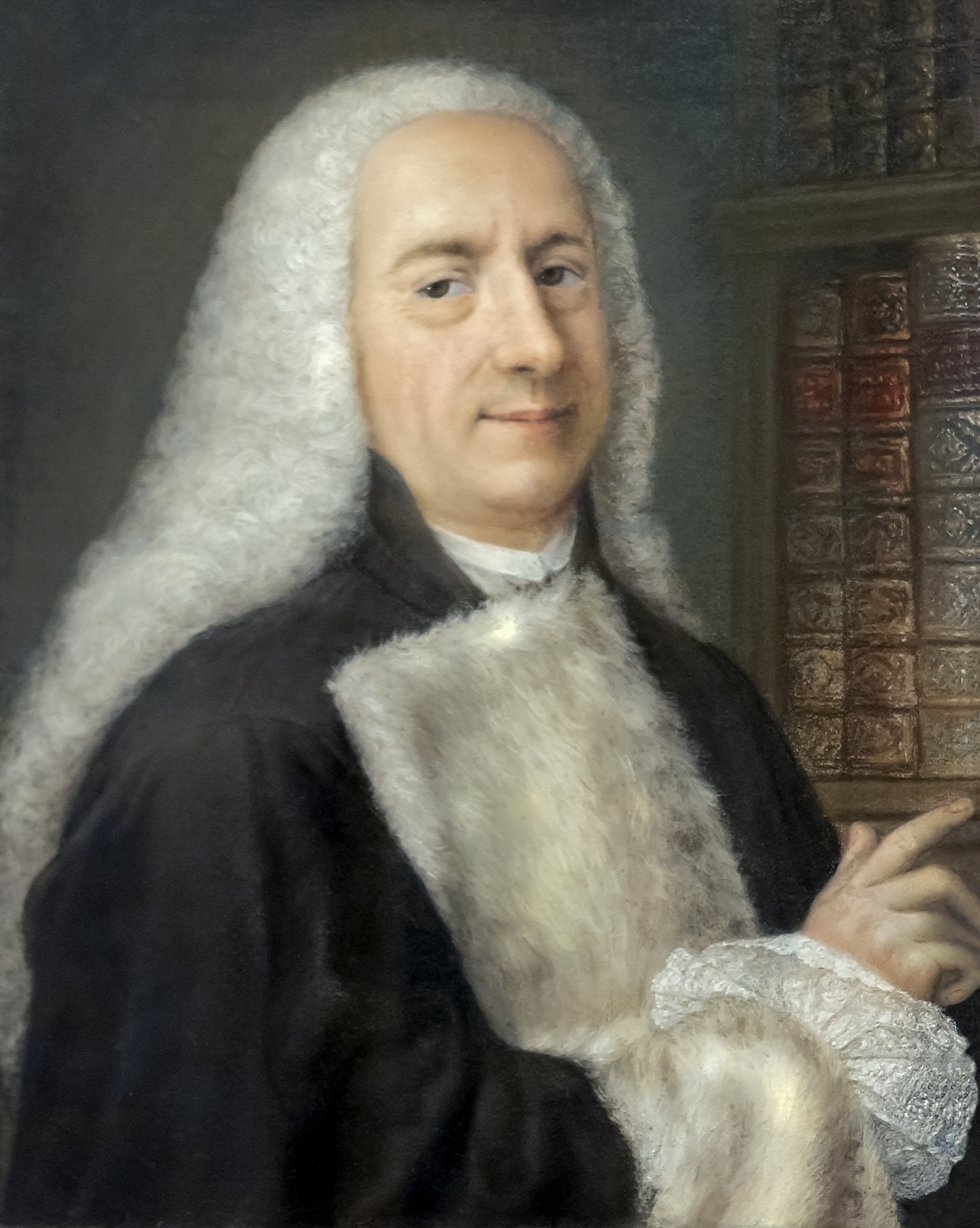
Ritratto di un nobile - Gian Antonio Lazzari

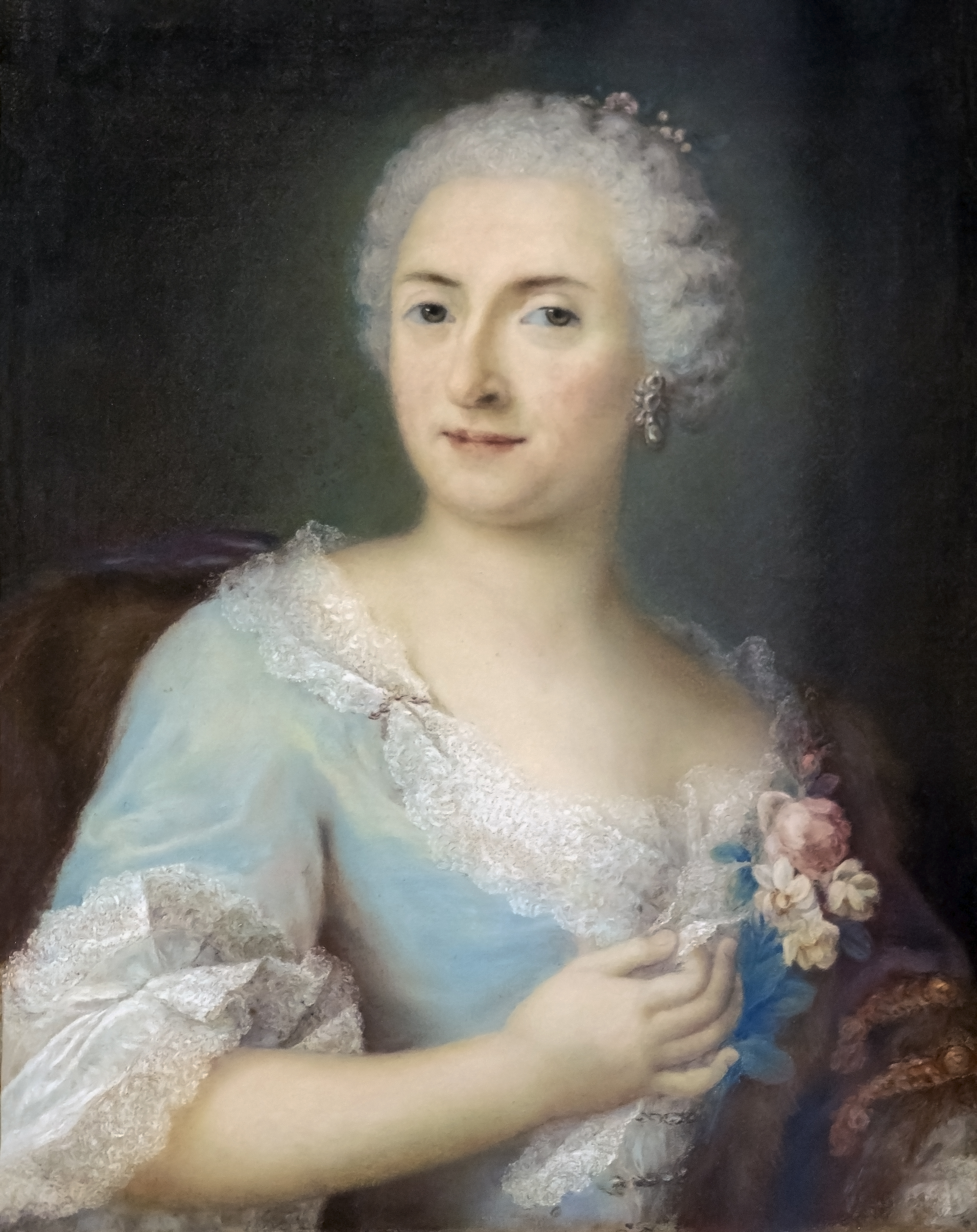
Ritratto di gentildonna - Gian Antonio Lazzari

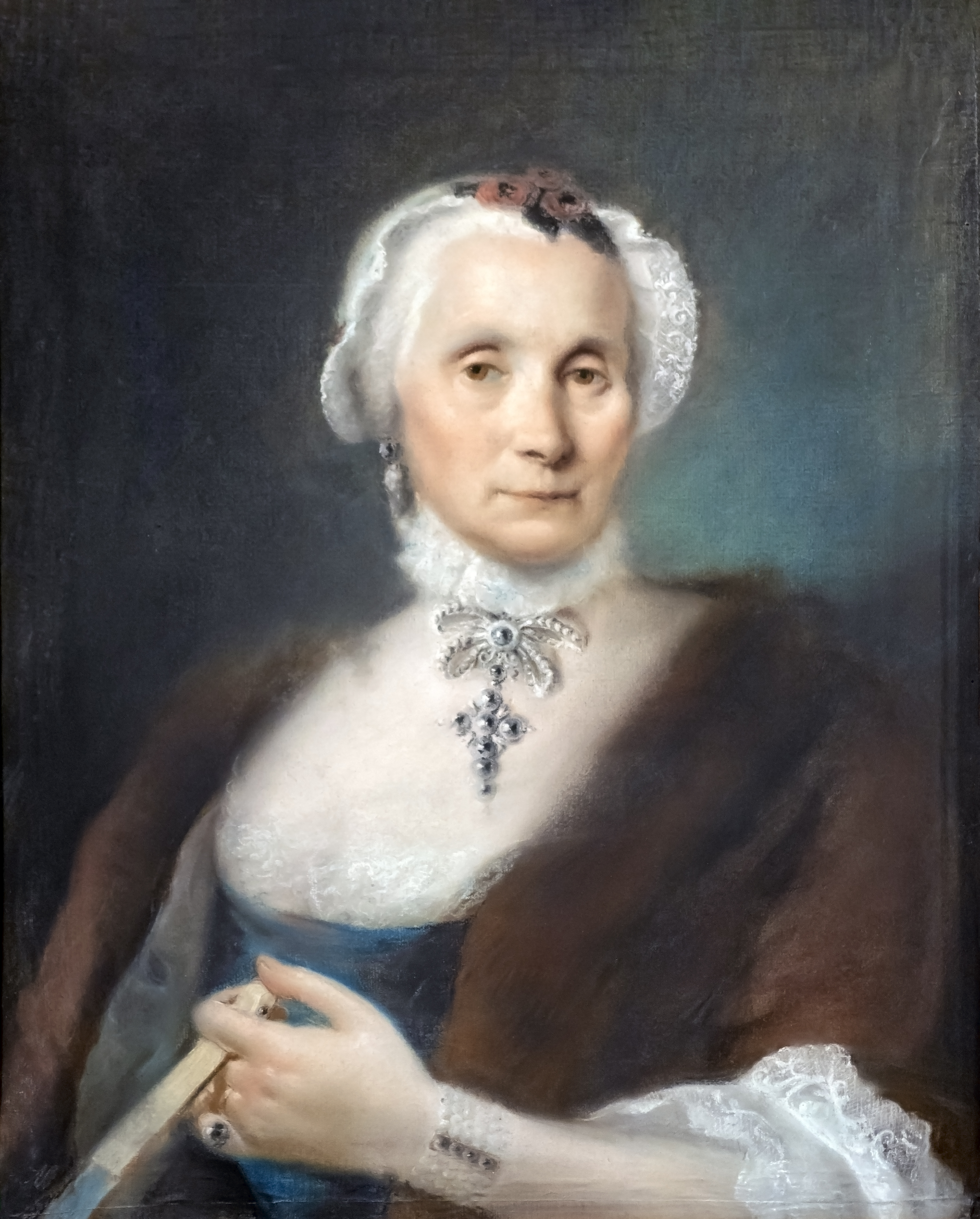
Cecilia Guardi Tiepolo - Lorenzo Tiepolo

=== The Tapestry Hall ===
features three large Flemish tapestries from the end of the 17th century, as well as sculpted and gilded furniture from the period. The ceiling frescoes represent The Triumph of Virtue, by Jacopo Guarana. The yellow door is also notable; it portrays a lacquered painting of a Chinese man with a parasol, surrounded by floral motifs, and dates from 1760.

=== The Throne Room ===
At the end of the piano nobile, looks out at both the Grand Canal and the Rio San Barnaba. It takes its name from an elaborate gilded and sculpted wooden throne which was used during the brief visit of Pope Pius VI in 1778, on his way from Rome to Vienna. It was also the bridal chamber of Ludovico Rezzonico and Faustina Savorgnan. Besides the throne, the other notable features of the room are the ceiling frescos, titled The Allegory of Merit, which were painted by Tiepolo and his sons in just twelve days. The furniture in the room is also notable, particularly sculpted and gilded tables, mirrors and candlesticks, ornamented with statues of putti and figures representing the different virtues. The room also features several fine Chinese porcelain vases.

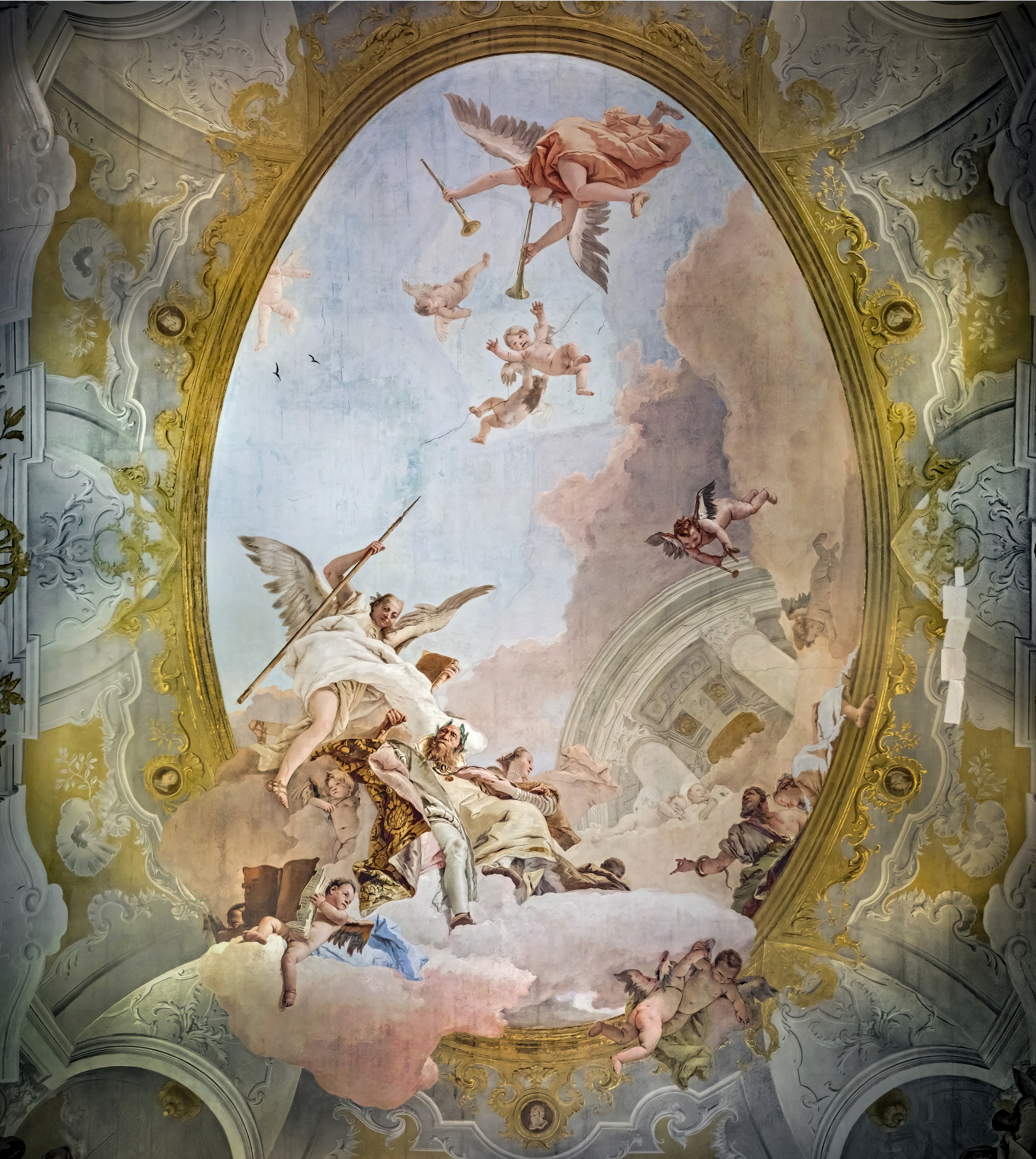
Allegory of Merit Accompanied by Nobility and Virtue
Giambattista Tiepolo

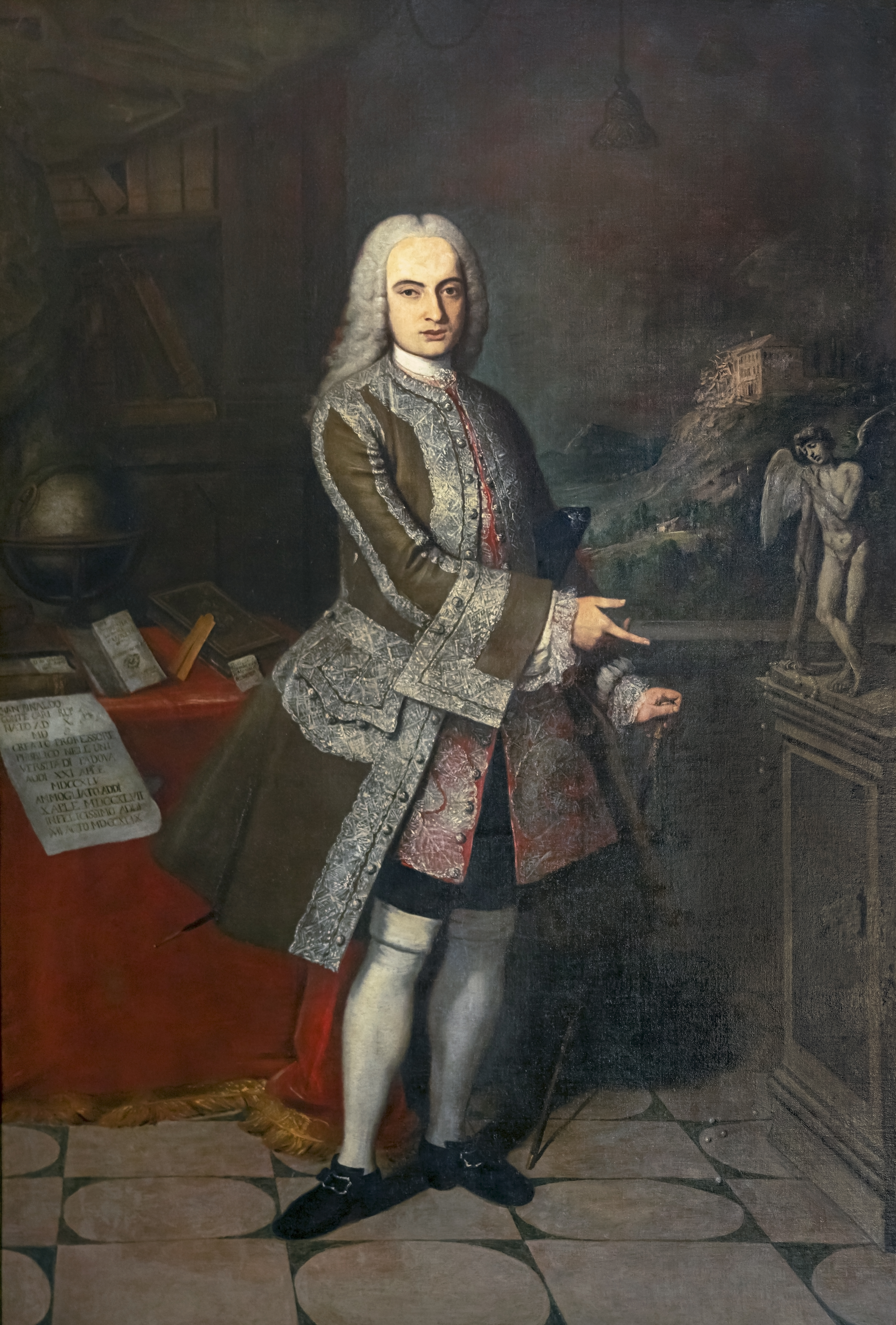
Gian Rinaldo Carli 1749 by Bartolomeo Nazari

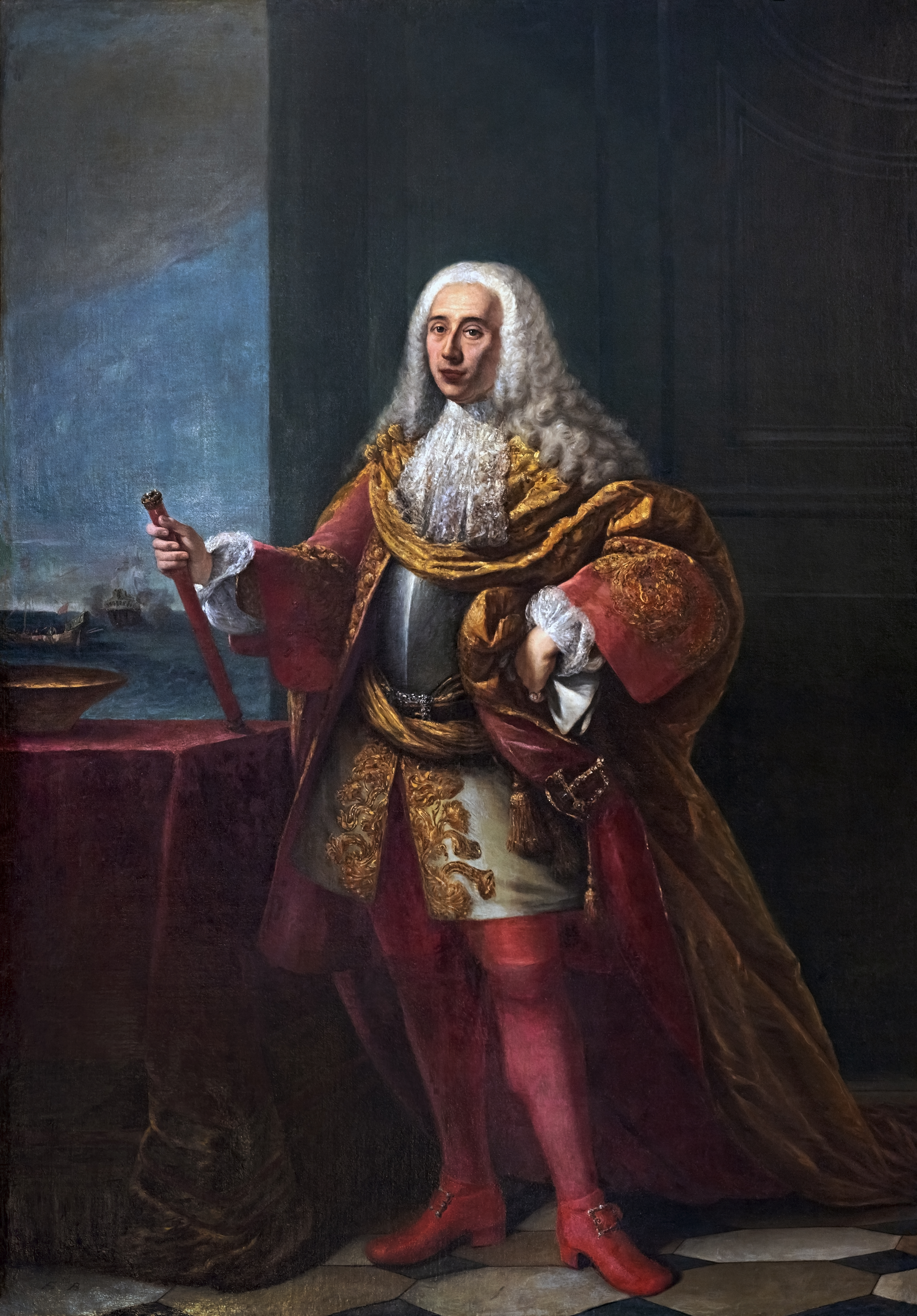
Gerolamo Maria Balbi by Fortunato Pasquetti

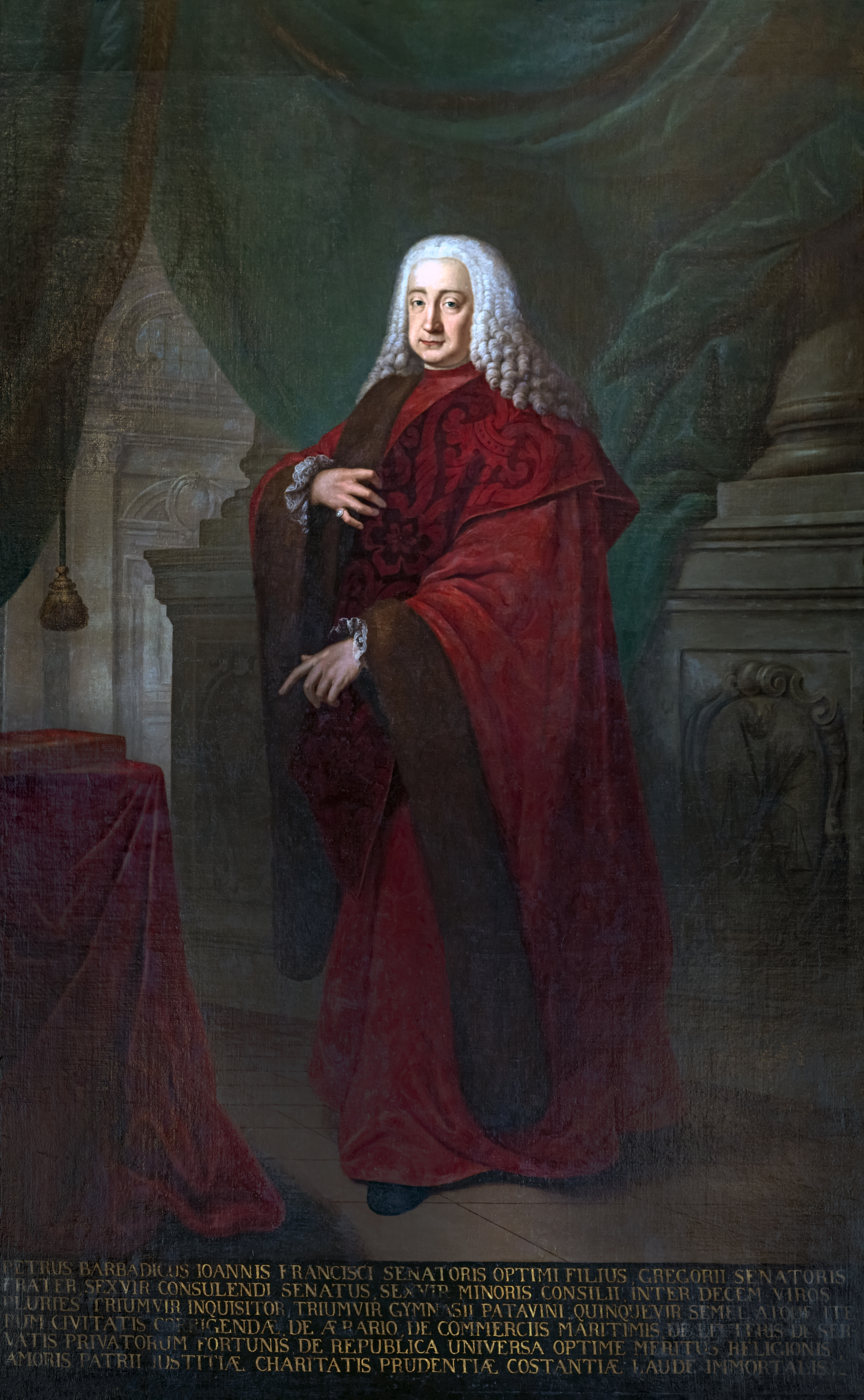
Pietro Barbarigo detto lo Zoppo by Bernardino Castelli

=== The Tiepolo Hall ===
Has the third of the four Tiepolo ceilings in the building, called Nobility and Virtue defeating Ignorance. Unlike the other Tiepolo ceilings, this ceiling, painted in 1744–45, was not made for the Ca' Rezzonico, but for the family of Pietro Barbarigo for his own house in Santa Maria del Giglio. It was bought by the city of Venice in 1934 and installed in the museum. The room also displays paintings by Venetian artists, including Pietro Longhi, Francesco Guardi, and two early works in oval frames by Giambattista Tiepolo from 1715 to 1716. The furnishings also pieces of Venetian baroque furniture, including a gaming table, and an ornate painted secretary, or cabinet, used to hold previous objects, made in Germany in the 18th century.

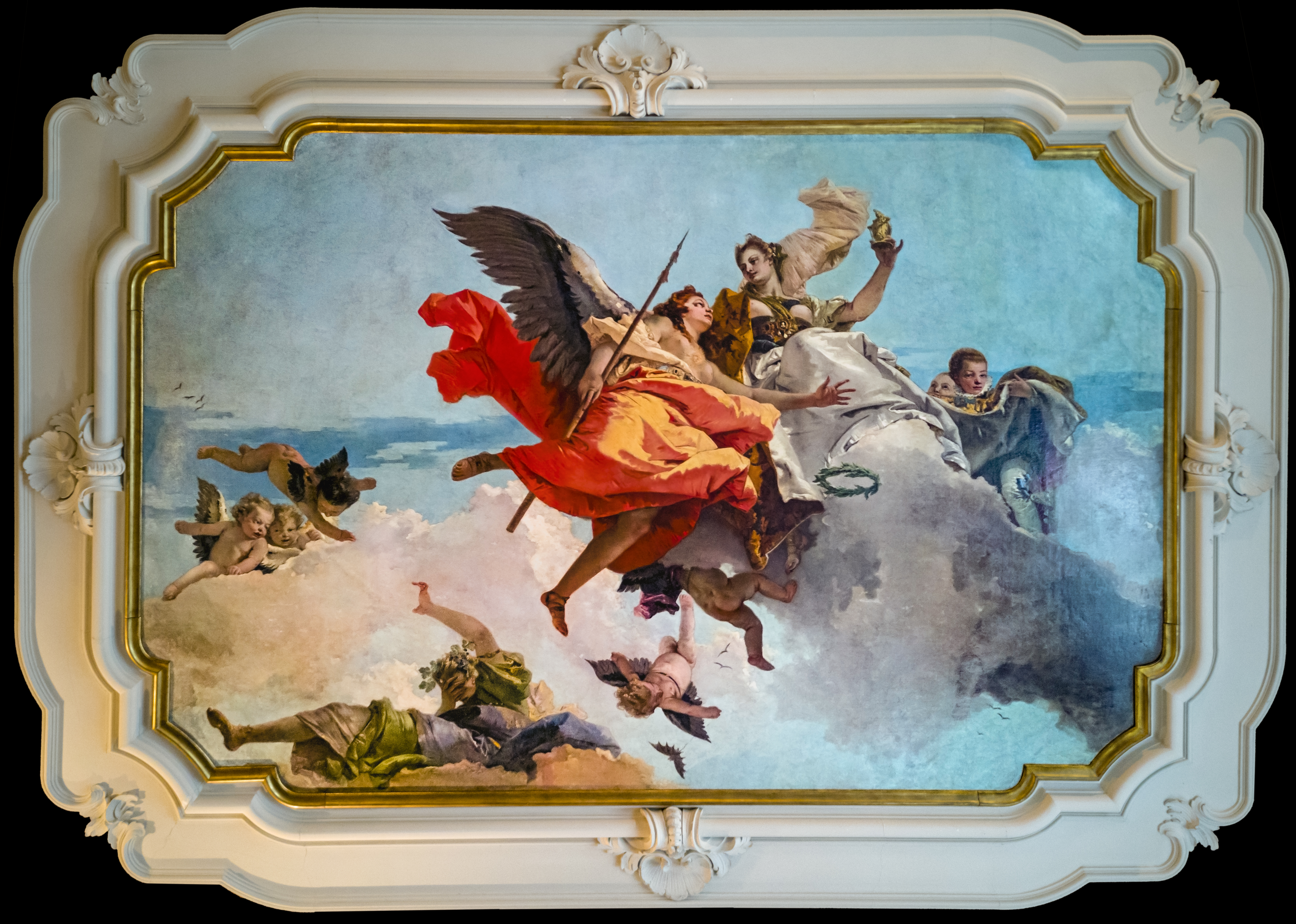
Nobility and Virtue defeating Ignorance by Giambattista Tiepolo

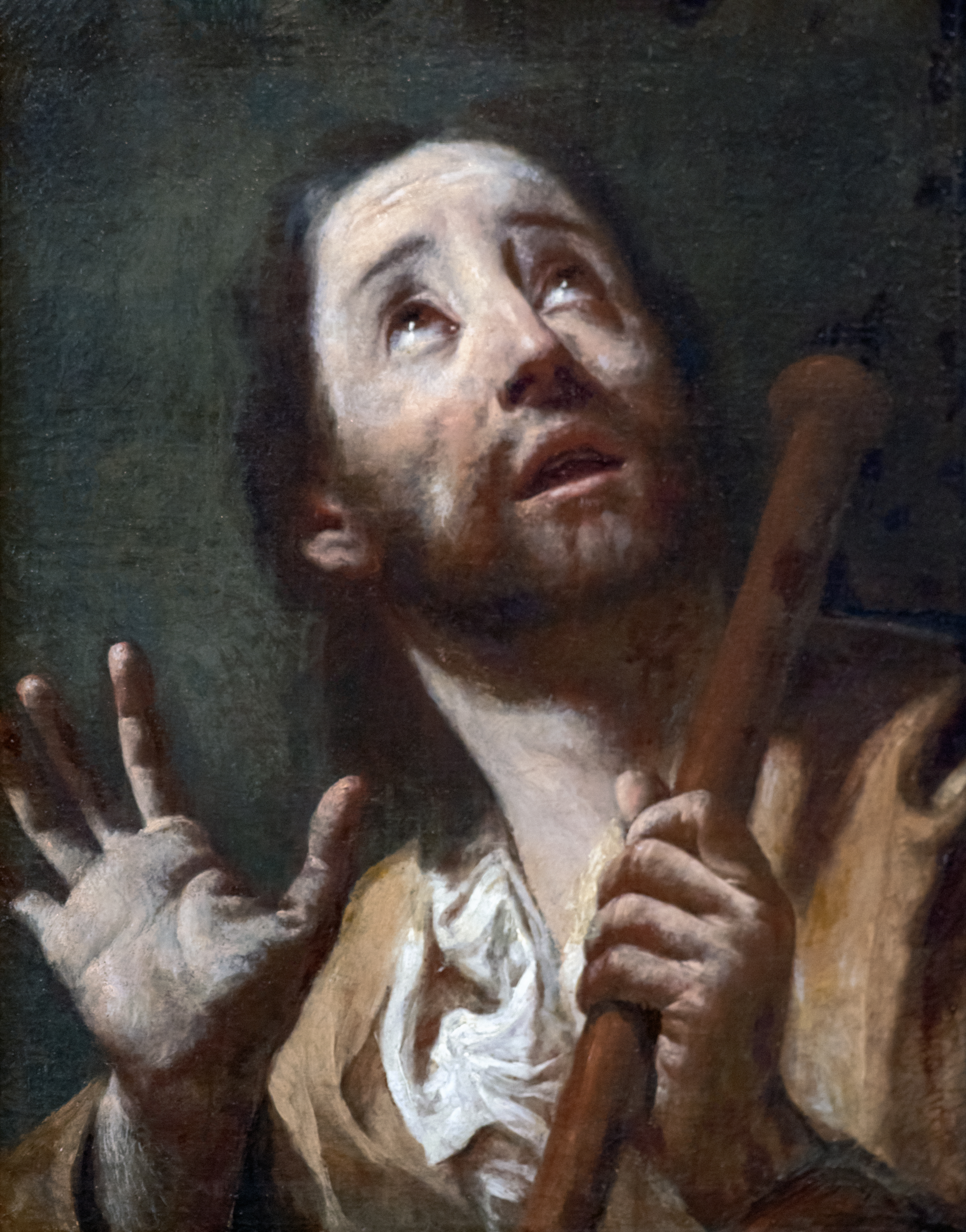
San Rocco by Giuseppe Angeli

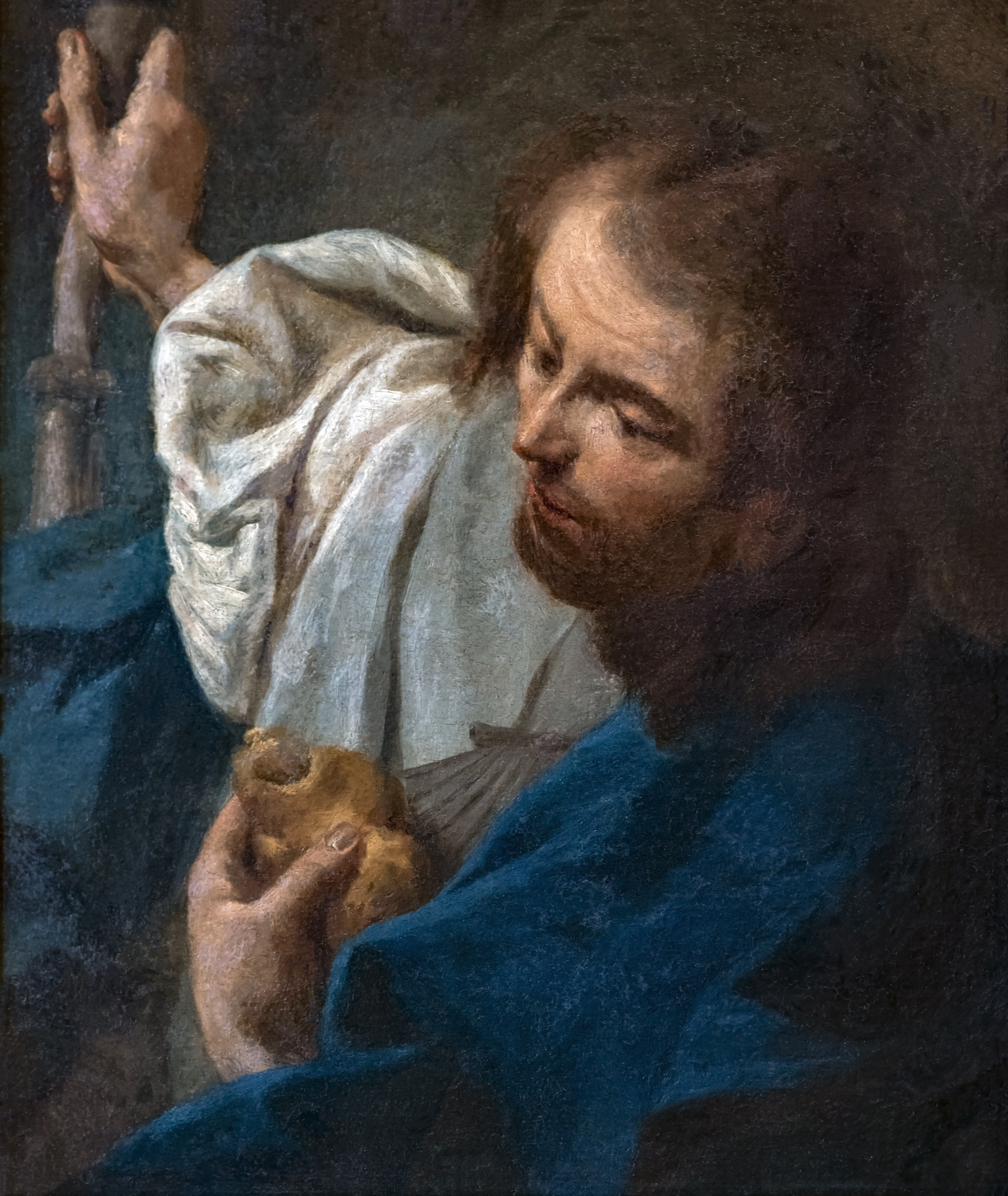
Giacomo il Maggiore by Giuseppe Angeli

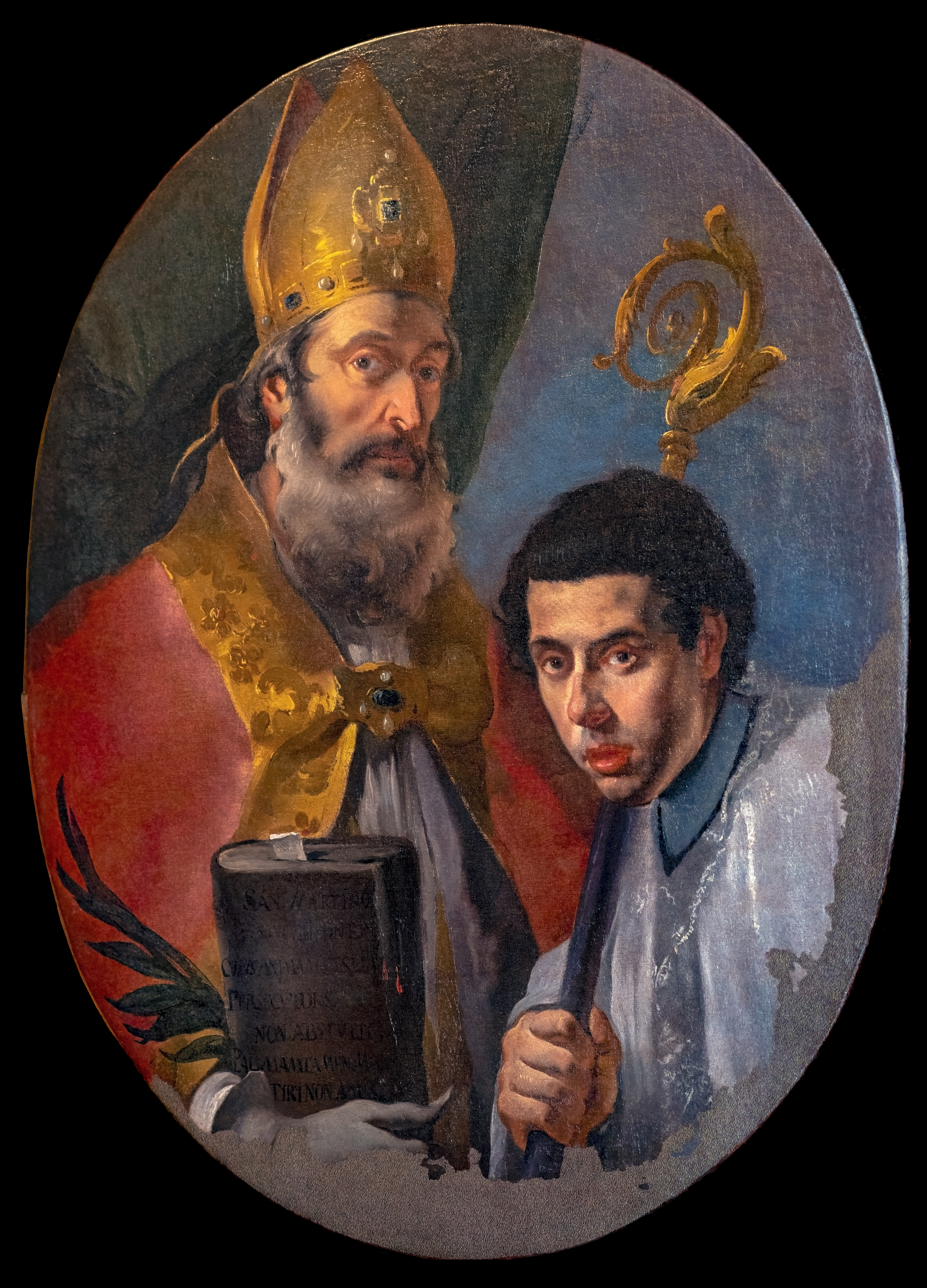
St Martin of Tours by Giambattista Tiepolo

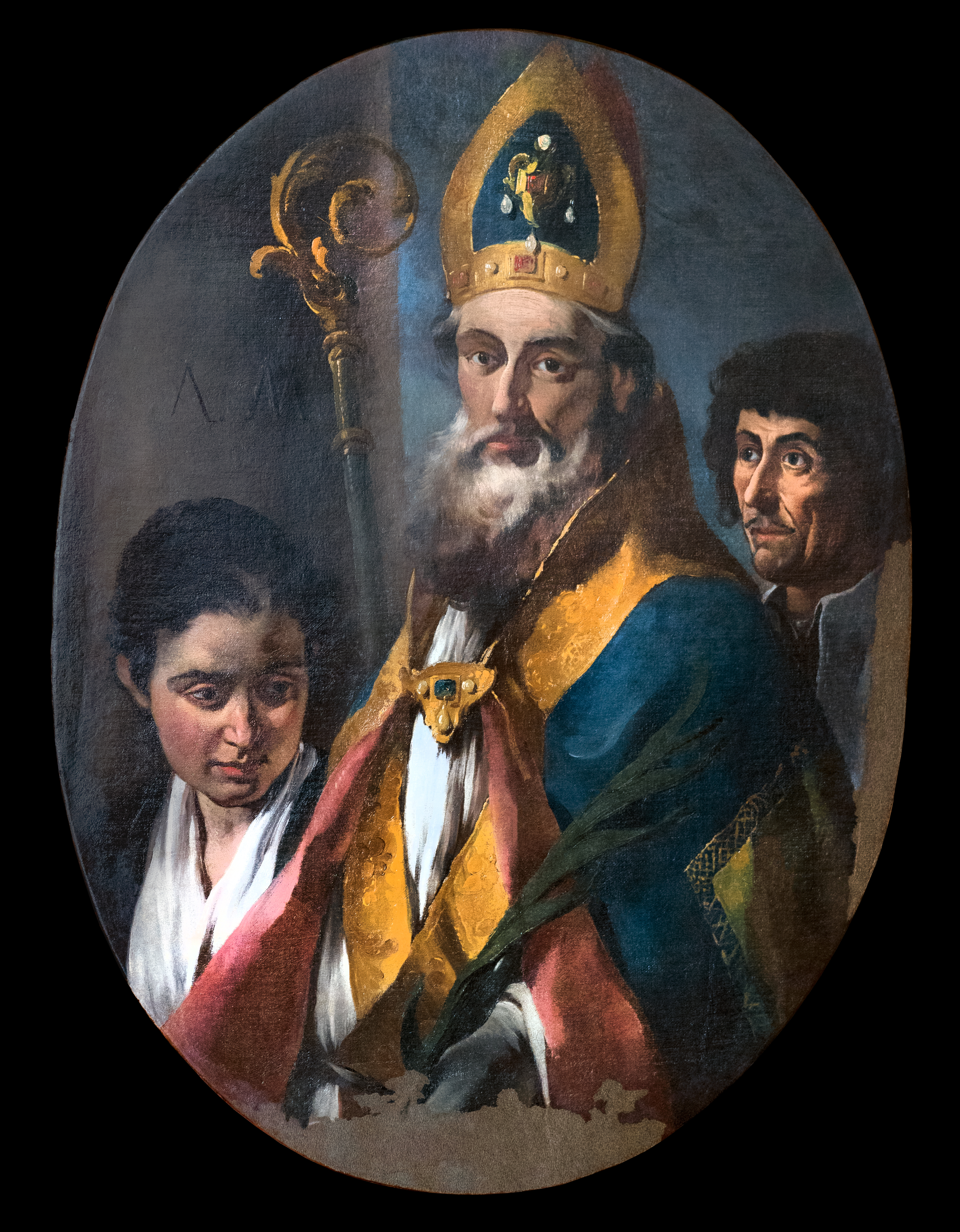
Saint Blaise by Giambattista Tiepolo

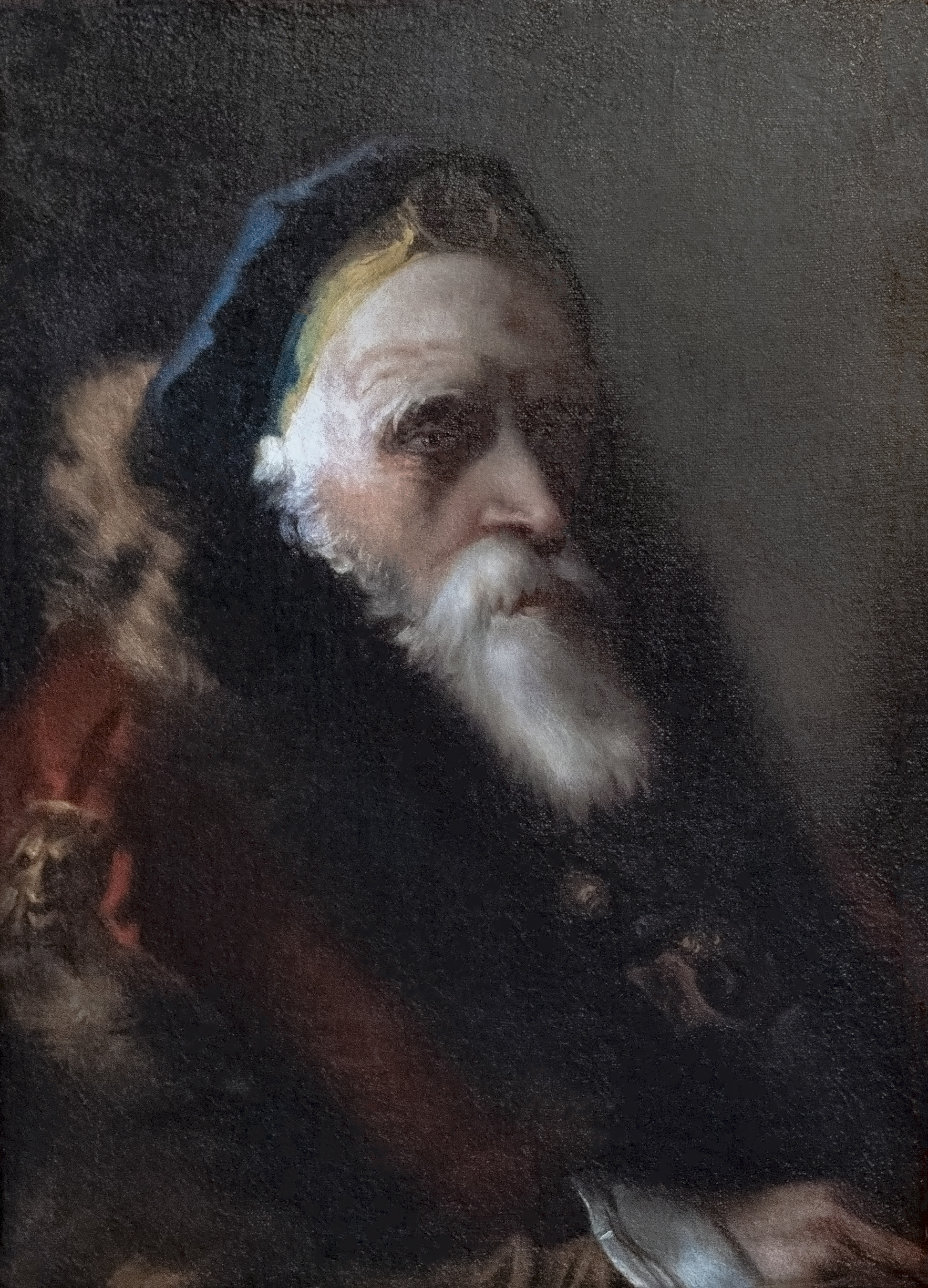
Old man with diadem by Giandomenico Tiepolo

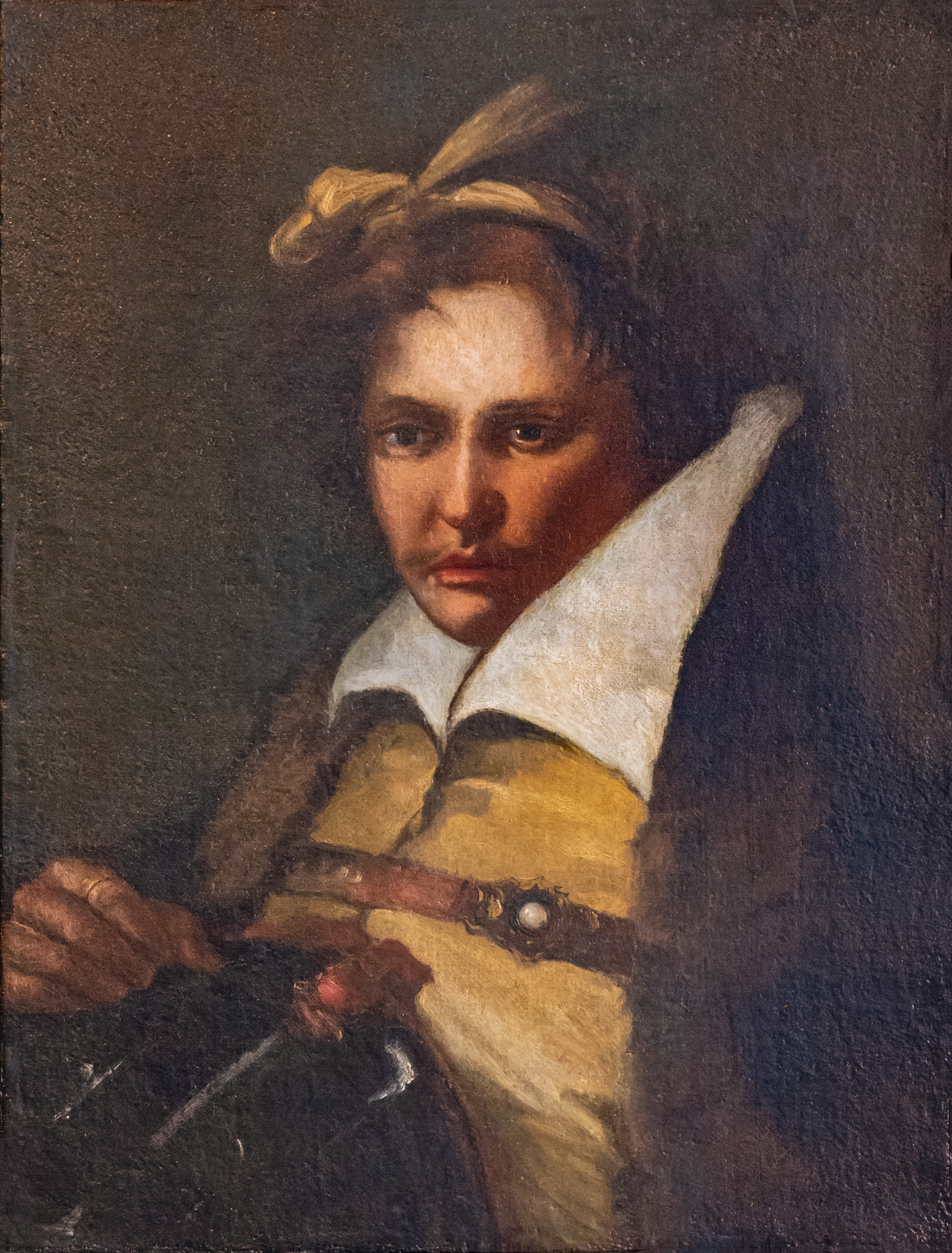
Young man with helmet by Giandomenico Tiepolo

=== The library ===
(or Morlaiter hall) with four large bookcases filled with small sculptures in terra-cotta or baked earth by the Venetian sculptor Giovanni Maria Morlaiter (1699-1781), which were acquired for the museum by the City of Venice in 1935. The ceiling has a fresco on the same theme as the Tiepolo fresco in the Throne Room, Allegory of Merit, by Mattia Bortoloni.

=== Lazzarini Hall ===
The Lazzarini Hall takes its name from the Venetian painter Gregorio Lazzarini, from the end of the 17th century. The three large mythological paintings in the room were attributed to him in the 19th century. More recent scholarship attributes one painting in the room, Orpheus massacred by the Bacchanantes, to Lazzari. The others are now attributed to Antonio Bellucci and Antonio Molinari. The five oval paintings on the ceiling, also on mythological themes, are by Francesco Maffei, from the end of the 17th century. The room also features a very fine marquetry desk, inlaid with ivory and decorated with gilded bronze, by the ebenist Pietro Pifetti, signed and dated 1741.

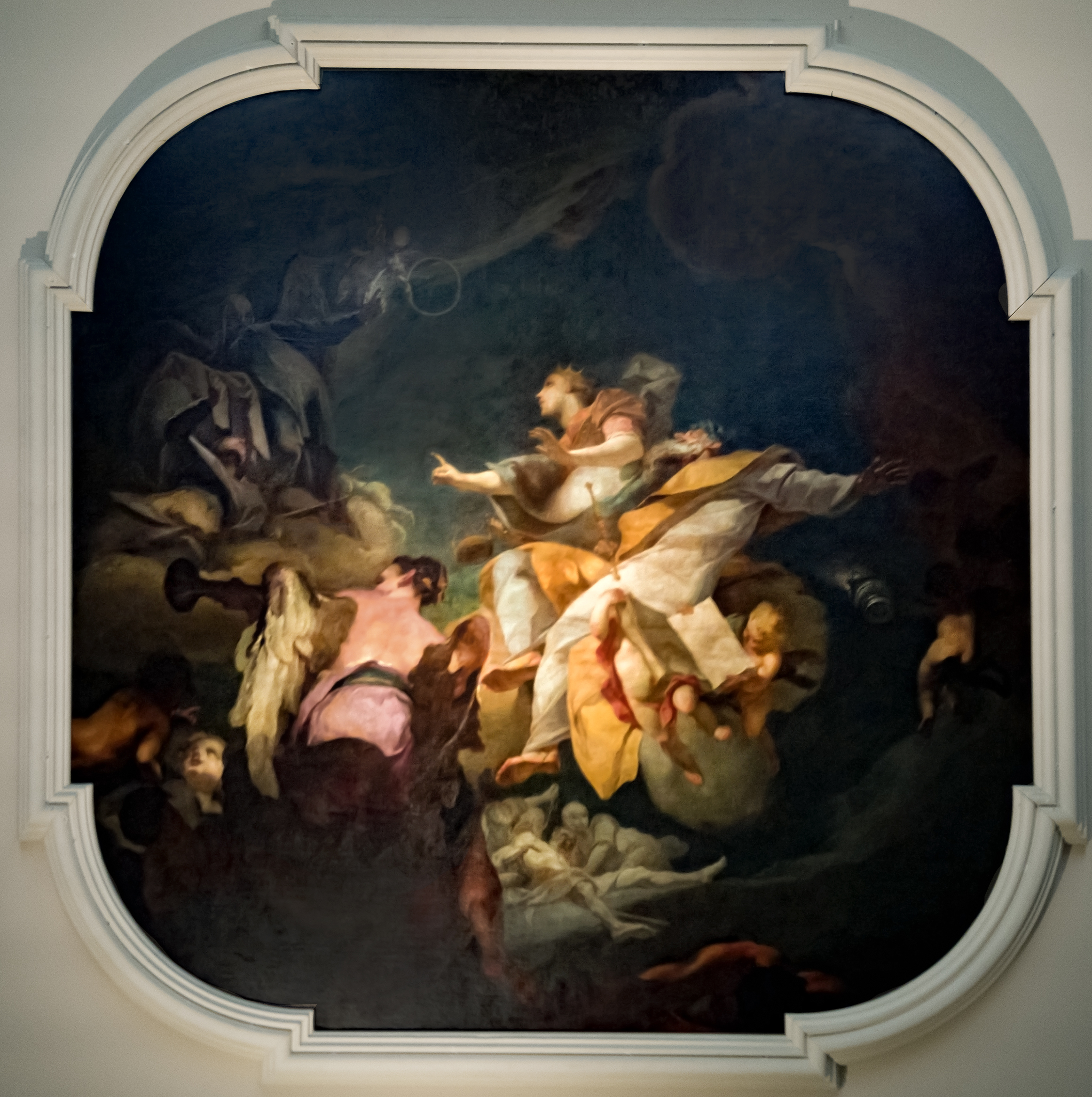
Allegory of Merit by Mattia Bortoloni

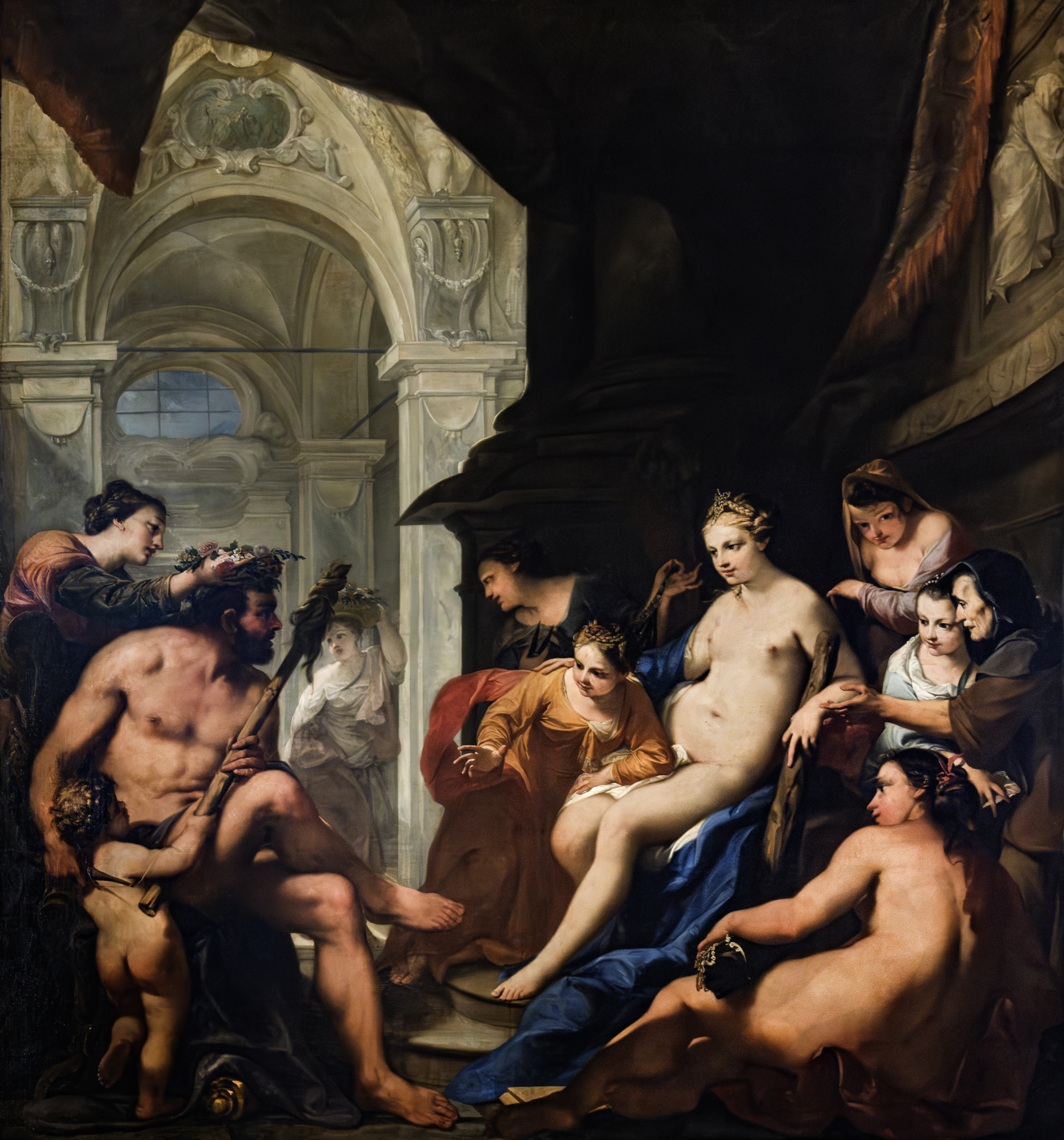
Hercules and Omphale by Antonio Bellucci

=== Brustolon Hall ===
The Brustolon Hall is devoted to the sculpted furniture and carved figures of Andrea Brustolon, the most celebrated Venetian baroque wood sculptor. The works displayed are dated 1706, and use different colored woods, including ebony, and extremely ornate baroque curves and twists to portray action and emotion. The room also features a notable chandelier with multi-colored glass in floral forms from the Murano glass workshop of Giuseppe Briani, made in the middle of the 18th century.

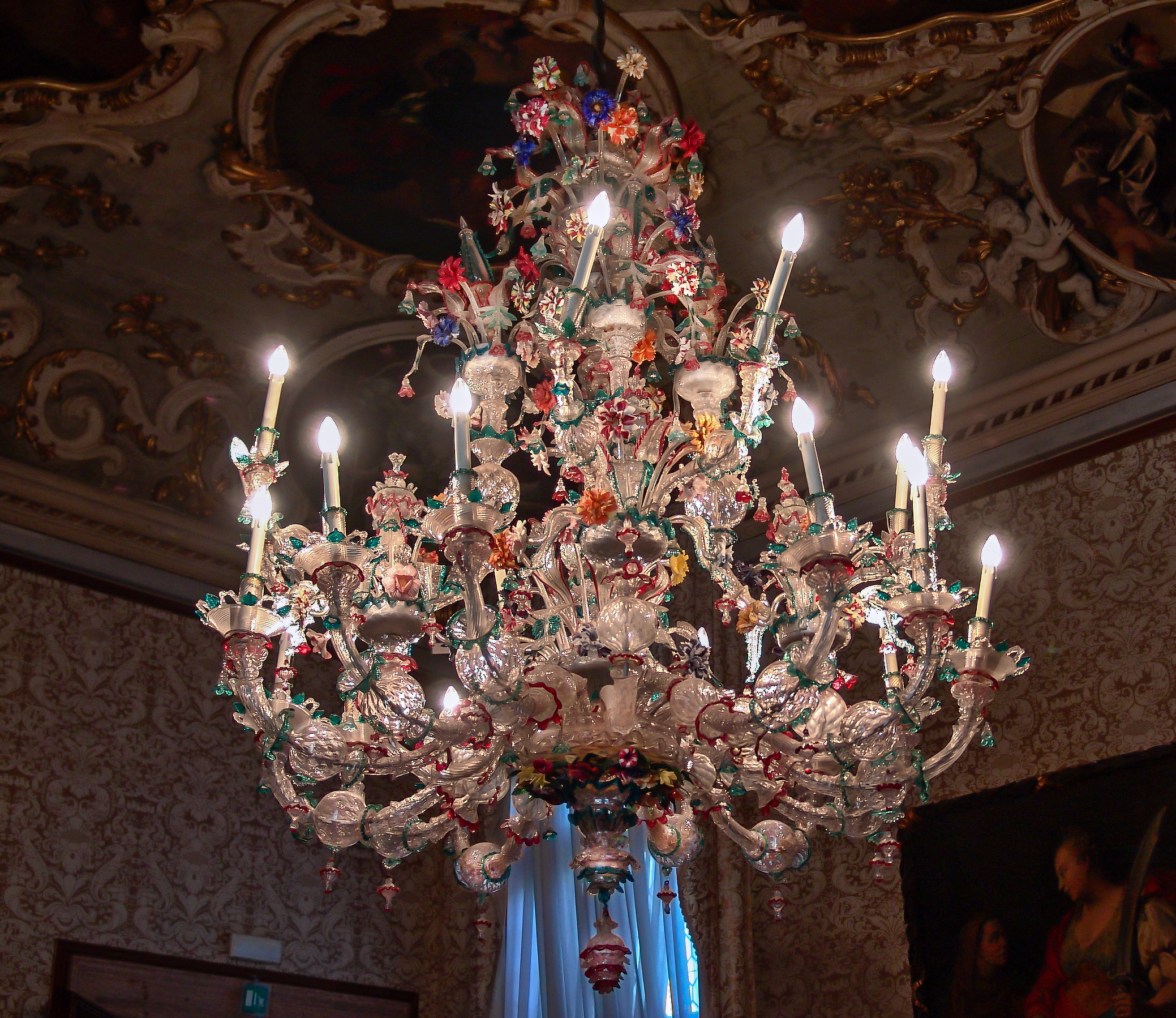
Murano glass chandelier in the Brustolon Hall by Giuseppe Briani (mid-18th century)

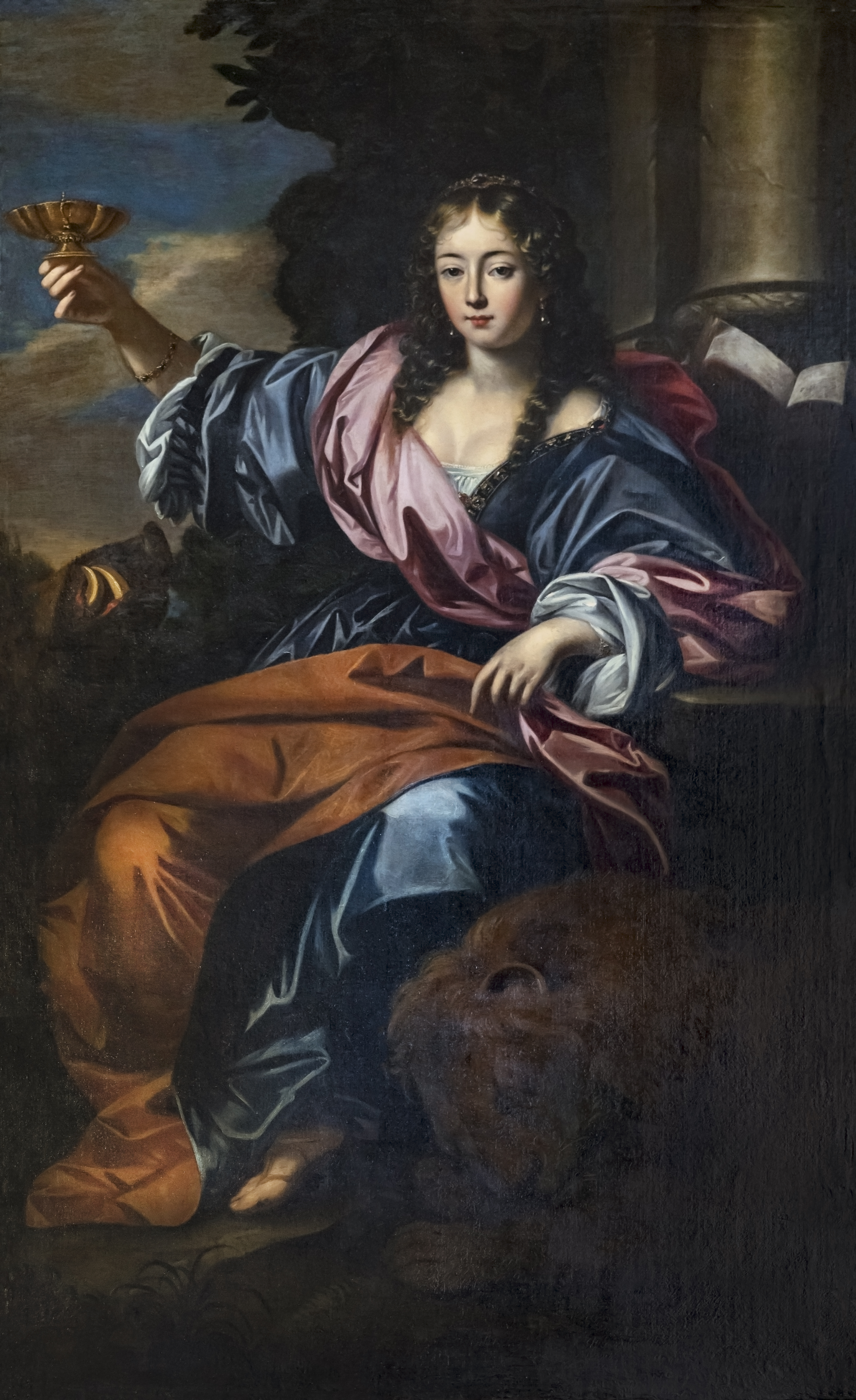
Allegory of the fortitude by Nicolas Régnier

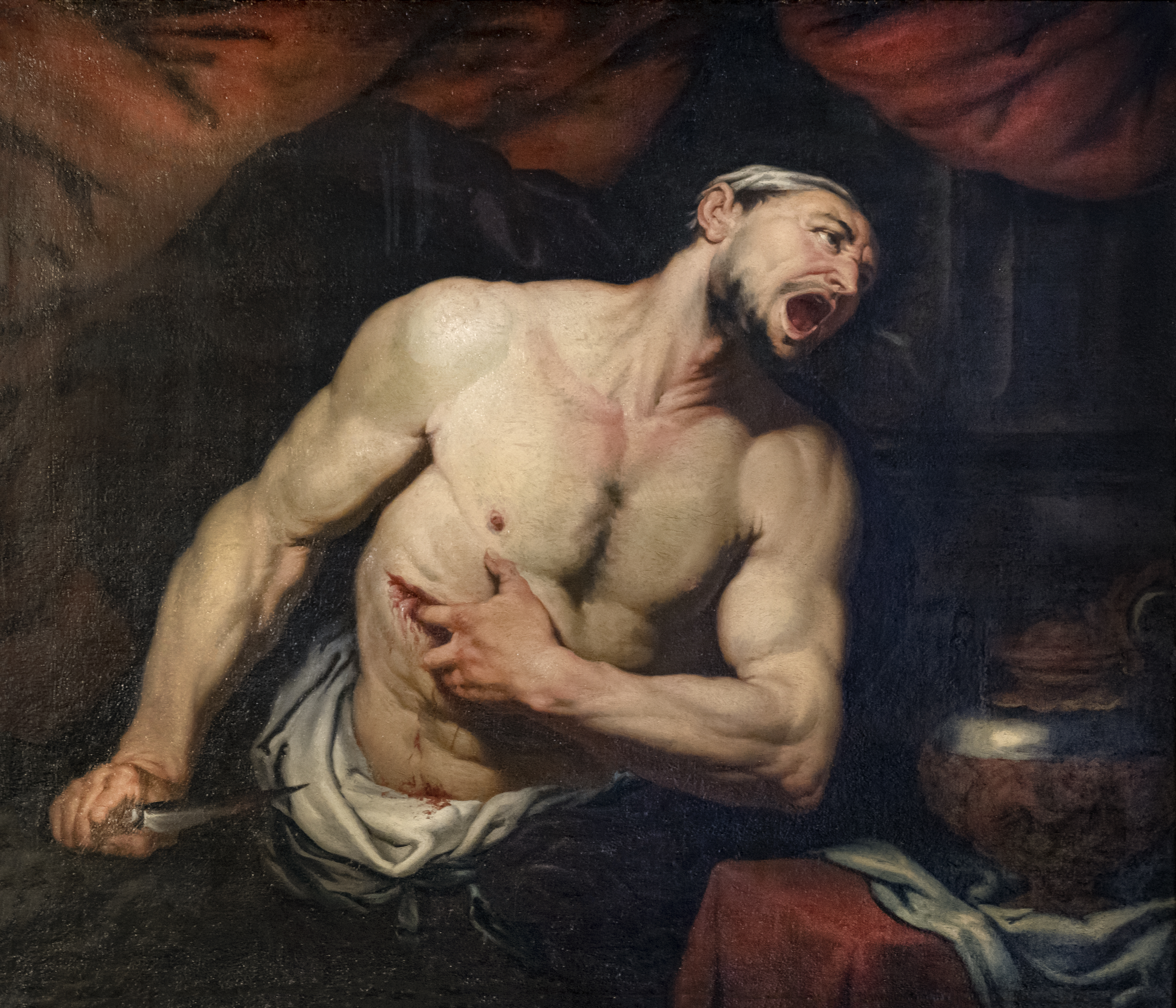
The suicide of Cato by Giambattista Langetti

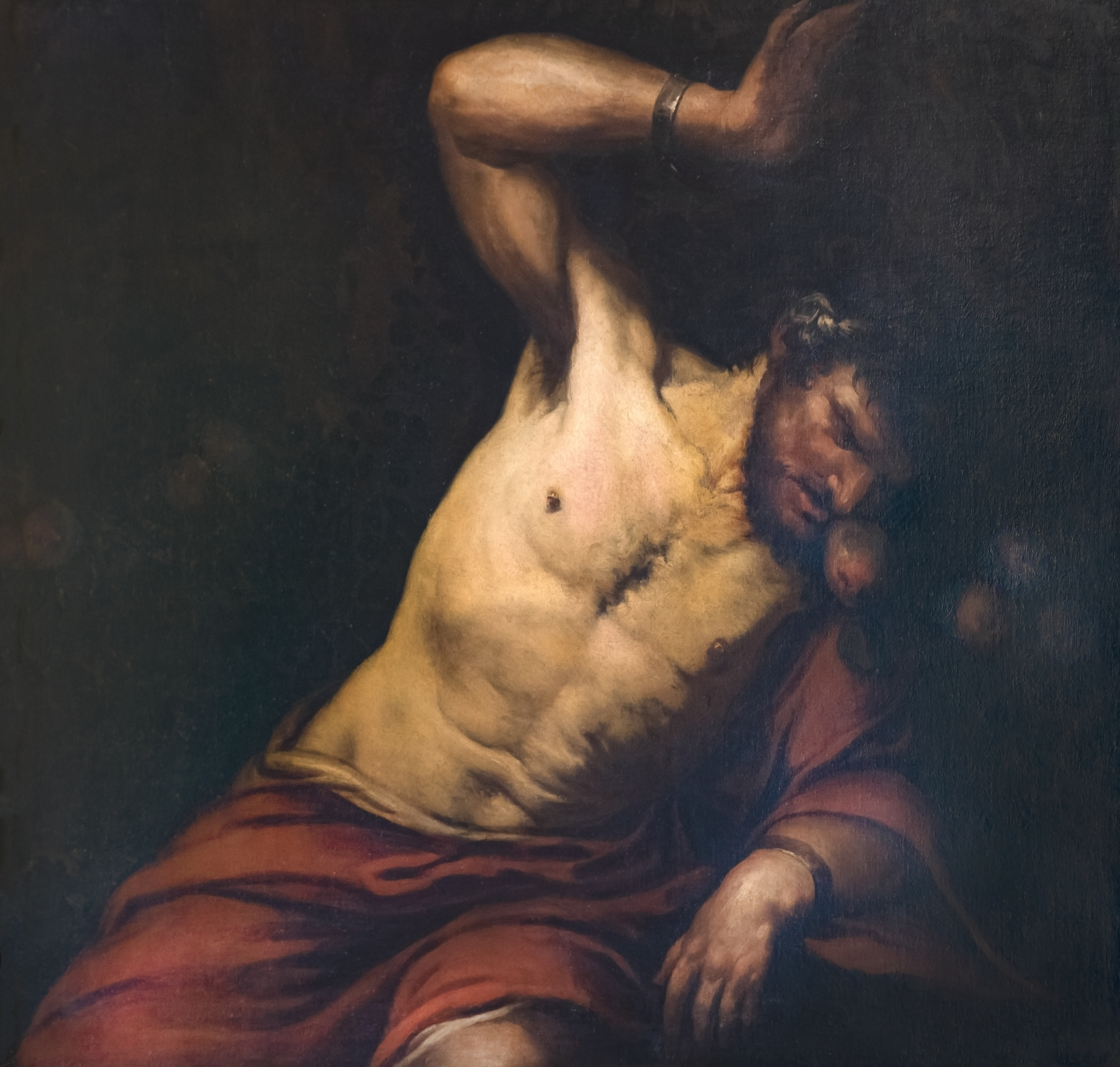
Tantalus chained by Giambattista Langetti

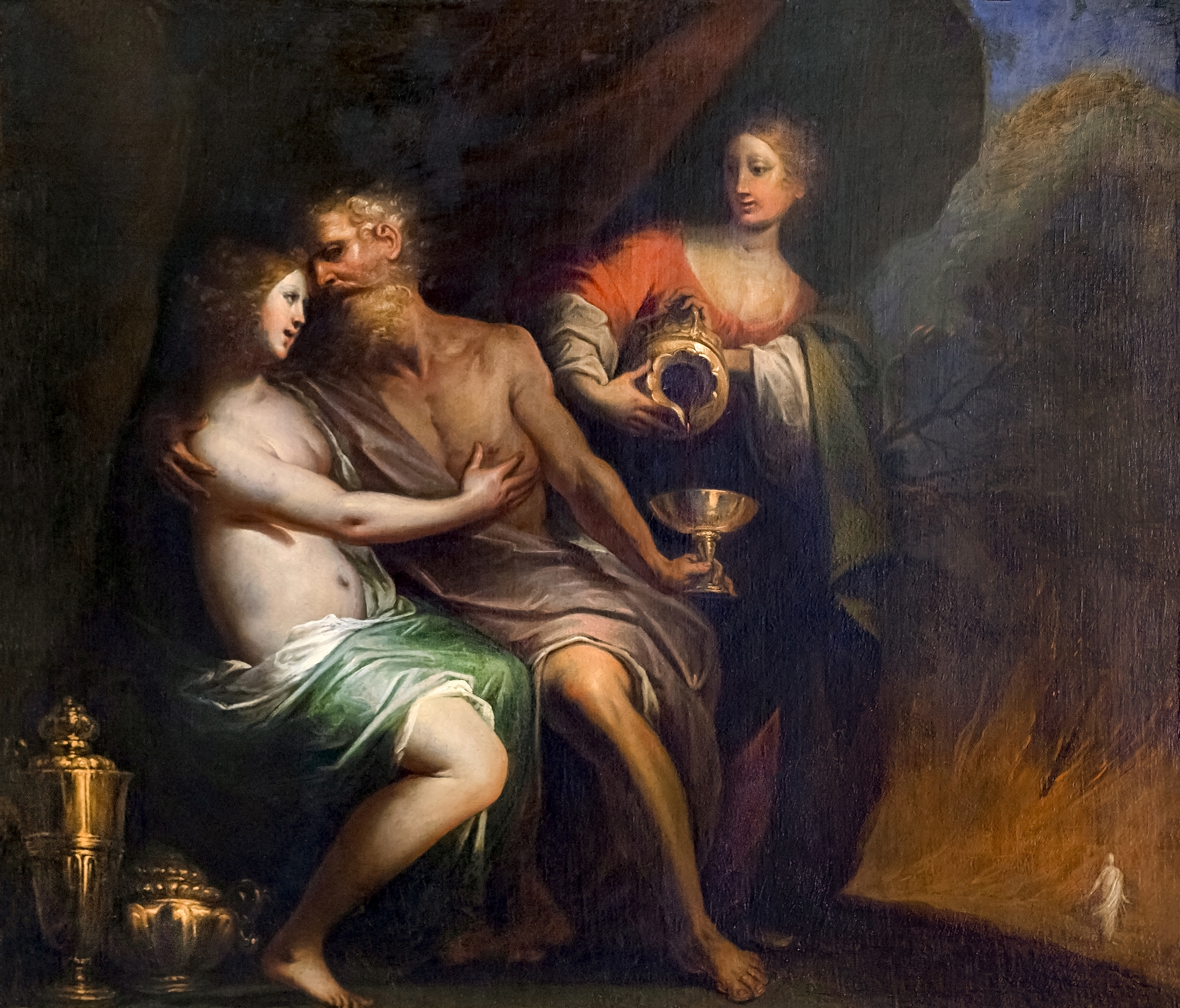
Lot and his daughters by Pietro Ricchi

=== Ceiling from palazzo nani in Ca'Rezzonico-museum ===
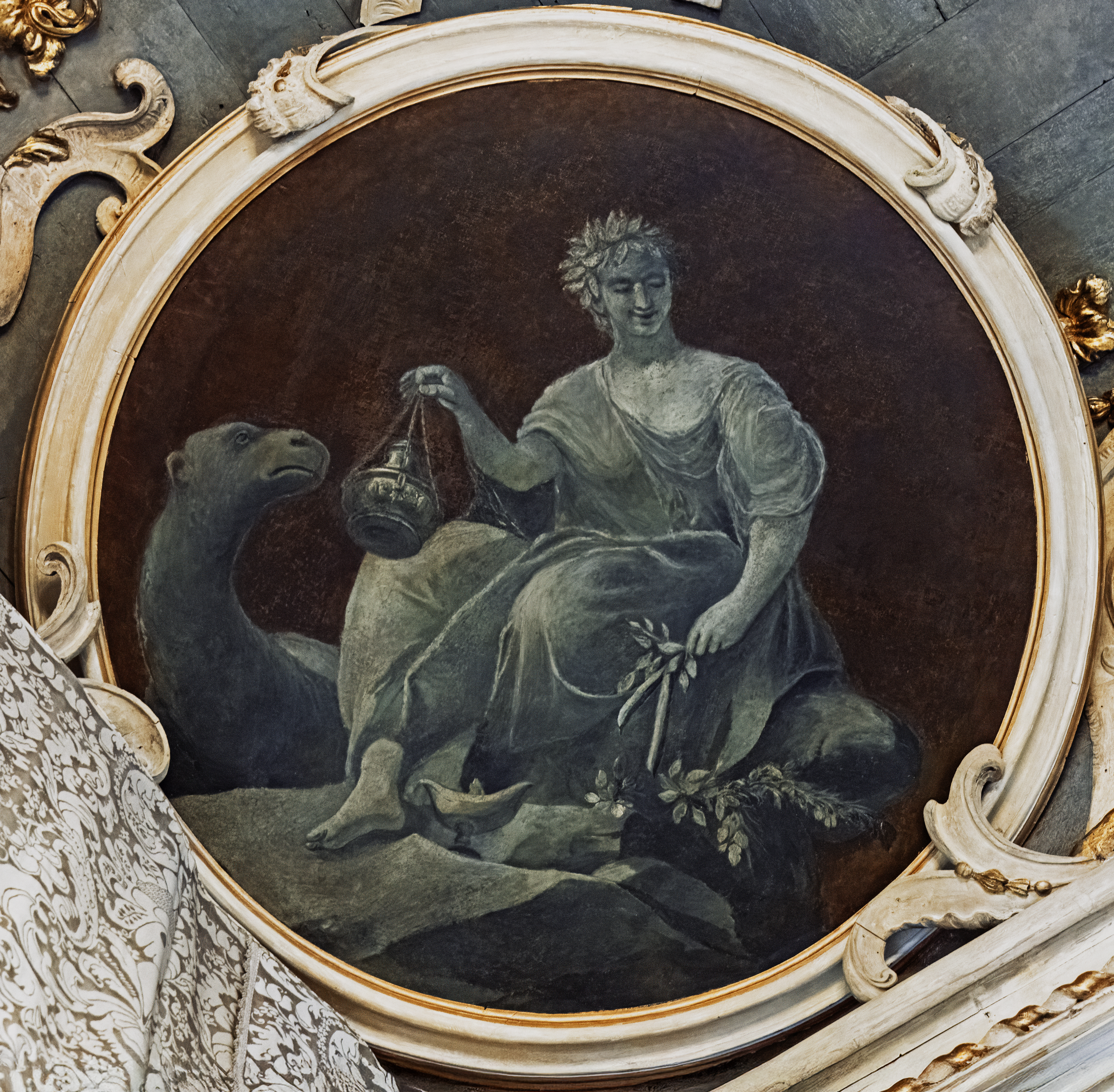
Africa

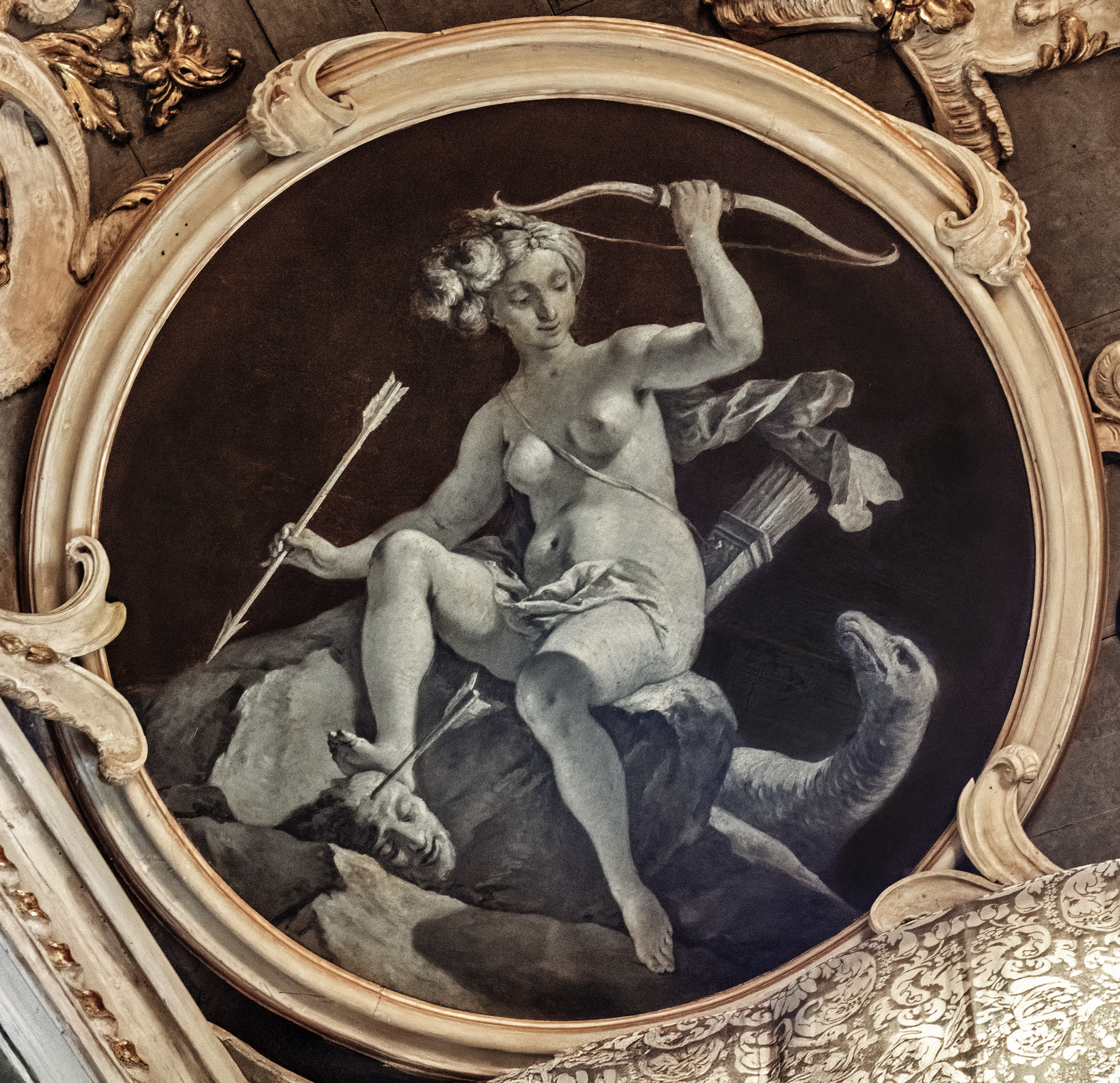
America

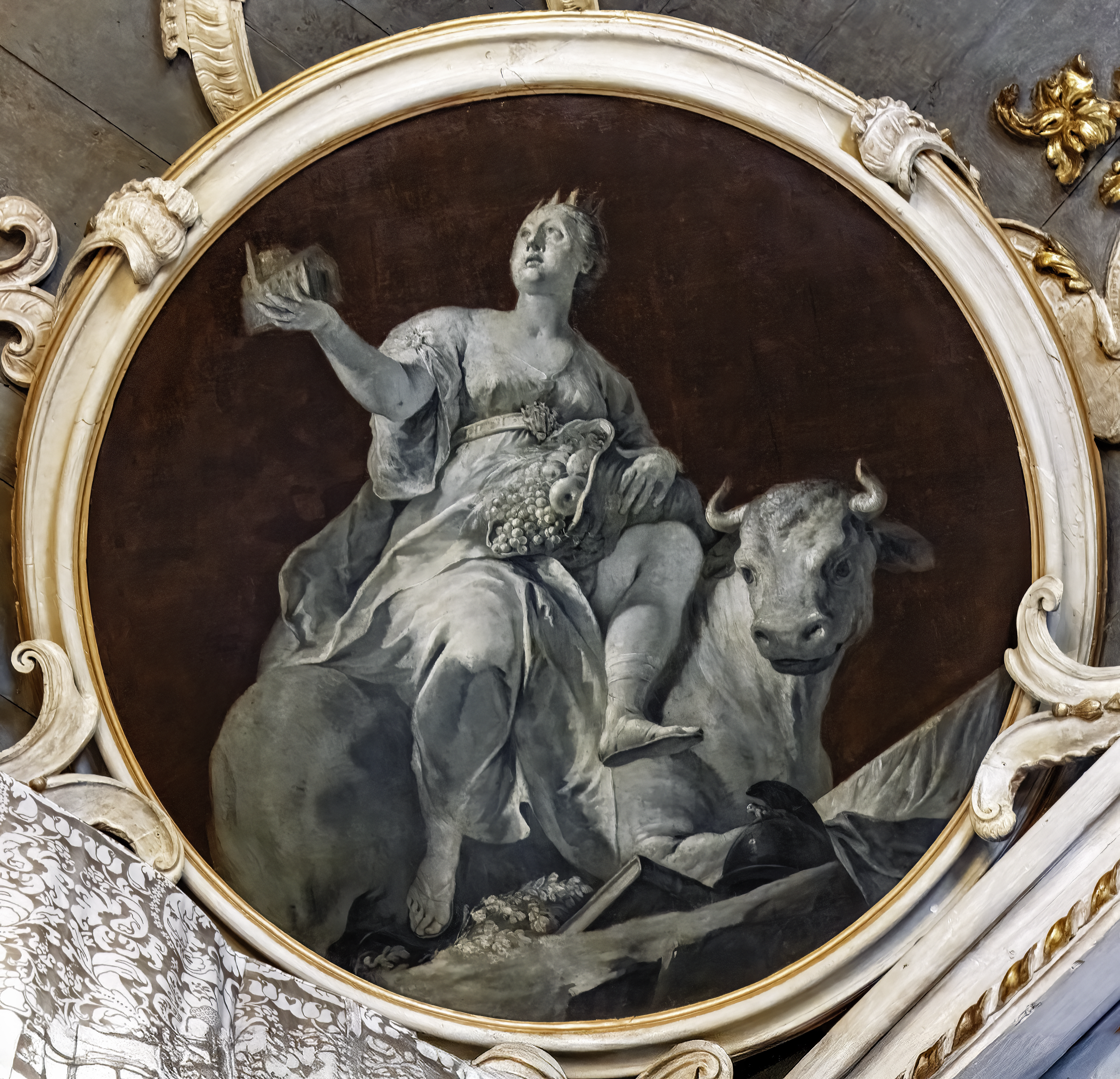
Europa

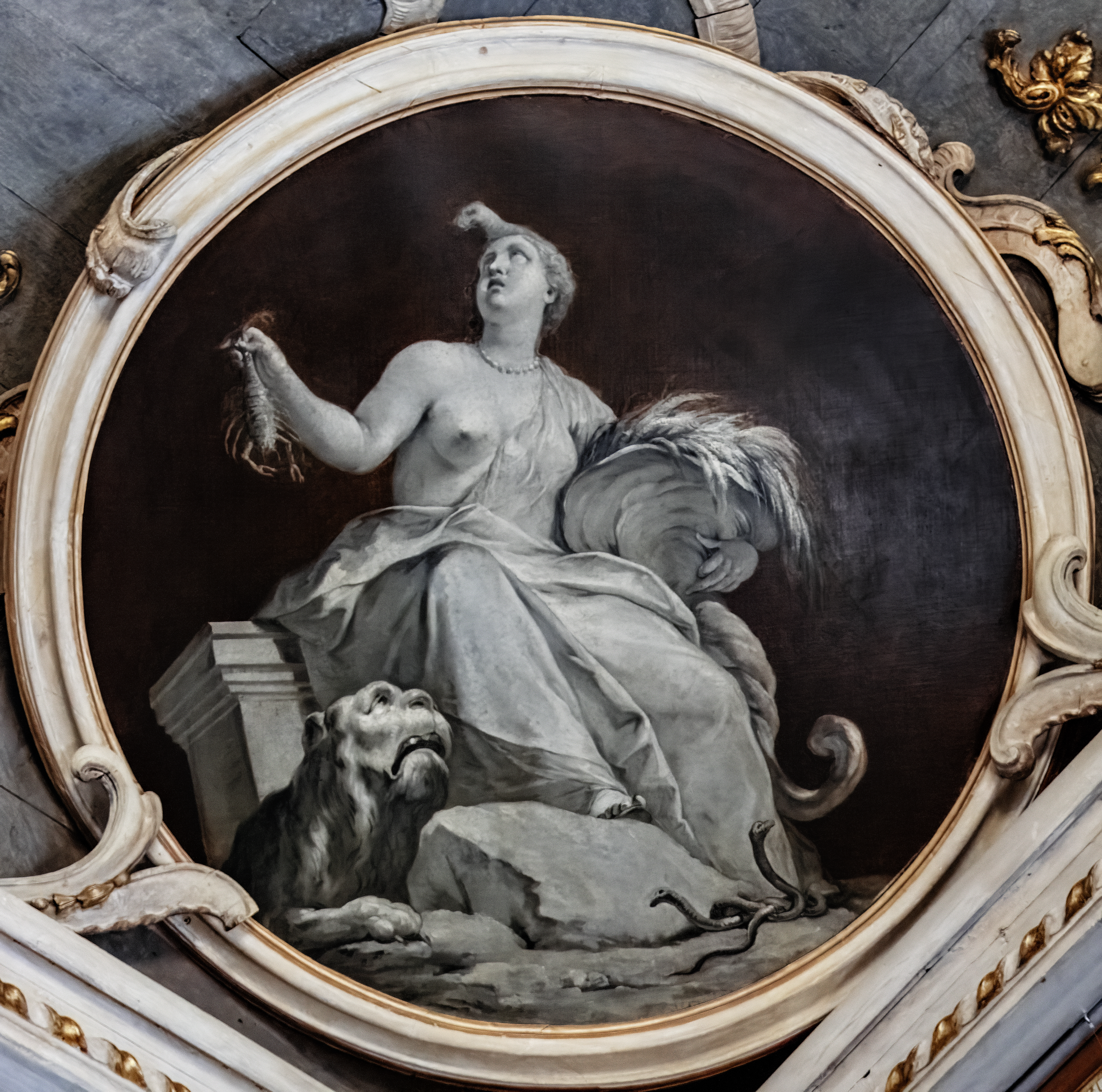
Asia

=== Portego ===
In the traditional structure of the Venetian palace, the portego, or passing lounge, was the largest room of the building, intended to play the role of a performance room. This space today presents marble busts of the eighteenth century representing allegorical portraits and figures, while the walls are covered with Red Verona marble.

- Lucretia by Filippo Parodi Italian sculptor Baroque of the Genoese school, pupil of Gian Lorenzo Bernini. Active in Padua and Venice.
- Allegory of Envy by Giusto Le Court.
- Pair of Atlantis marble supporting a lintel chimney by Alessandro Vittoria (1525 -1608) a sculptor Mannerist of the Venetian school.
- A marble bust of the Pope Innocent XI above the door.
- Busts of Democritus and Heraclitus by Giuseppe Torretti.
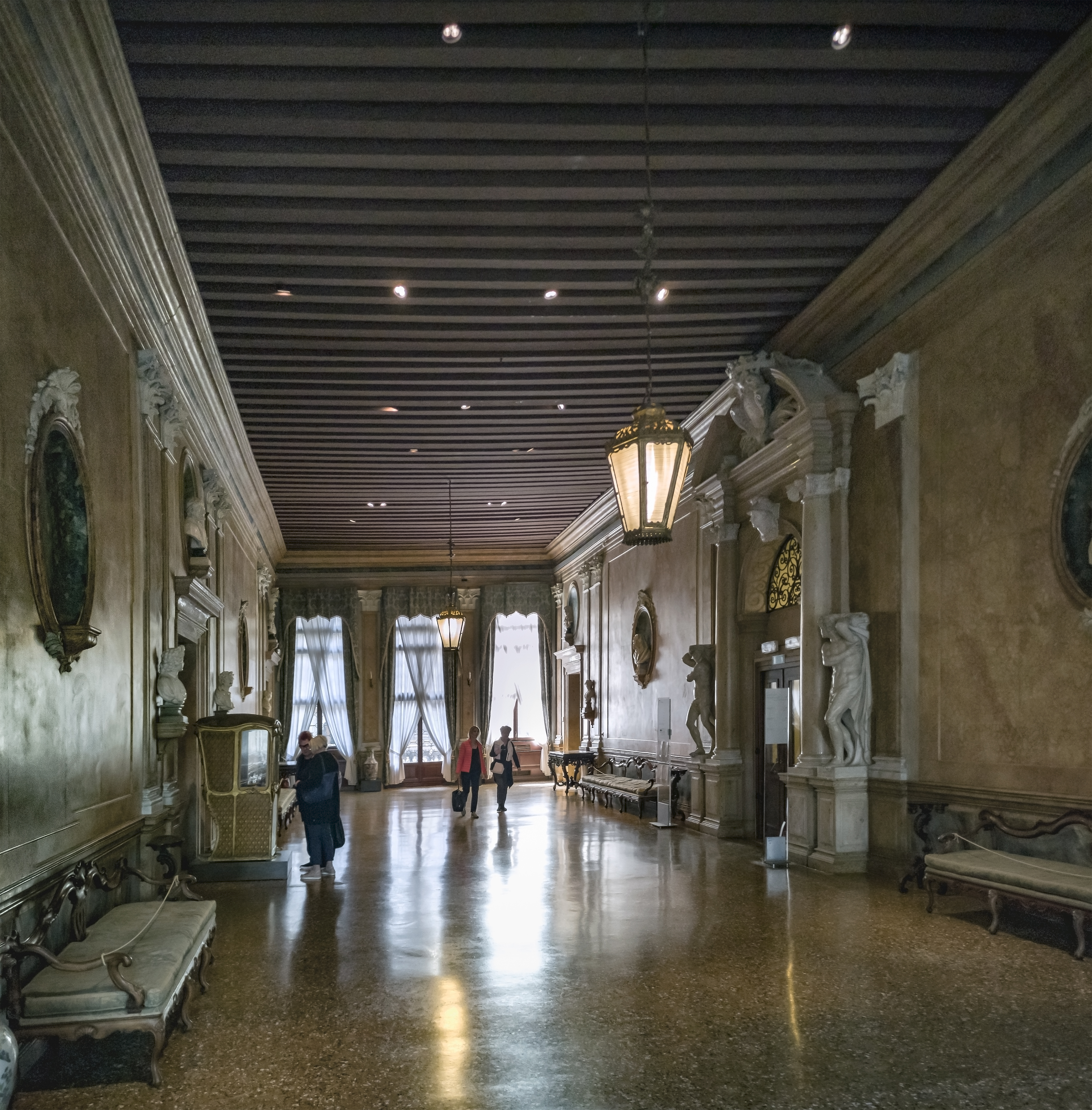
Portego

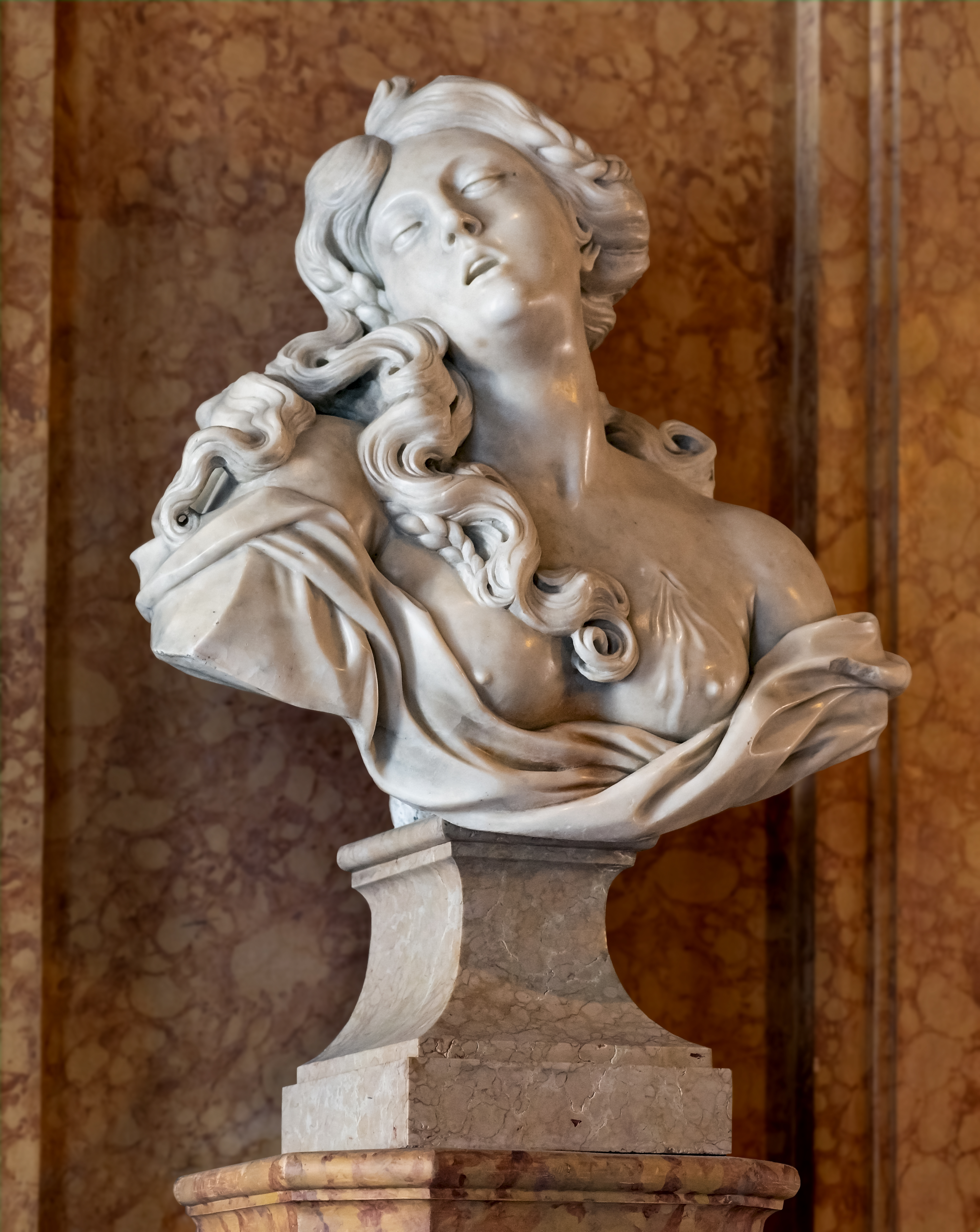
Lucrezia by Filippo Parodi

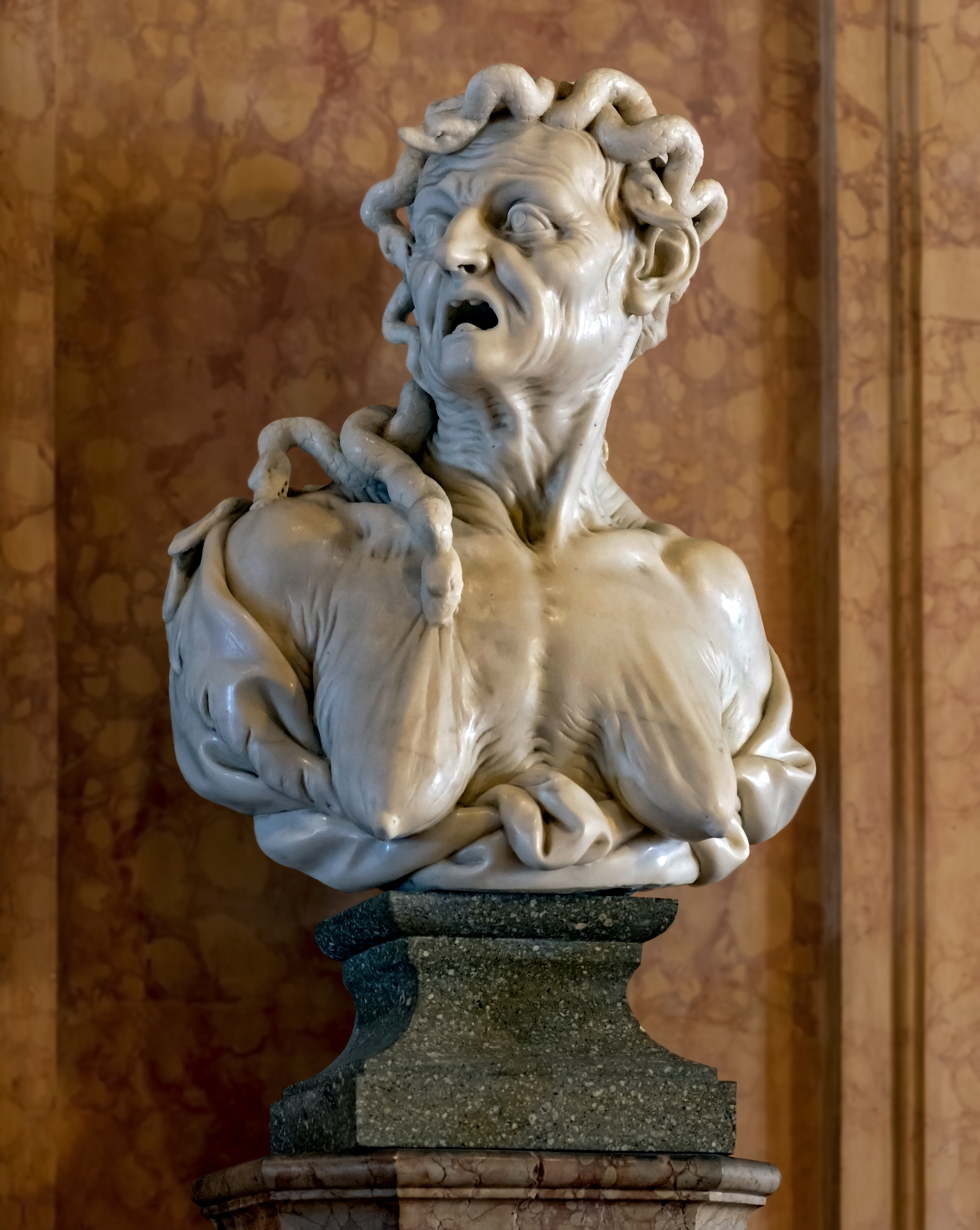
Allegory of Envy by Giusto Le Court

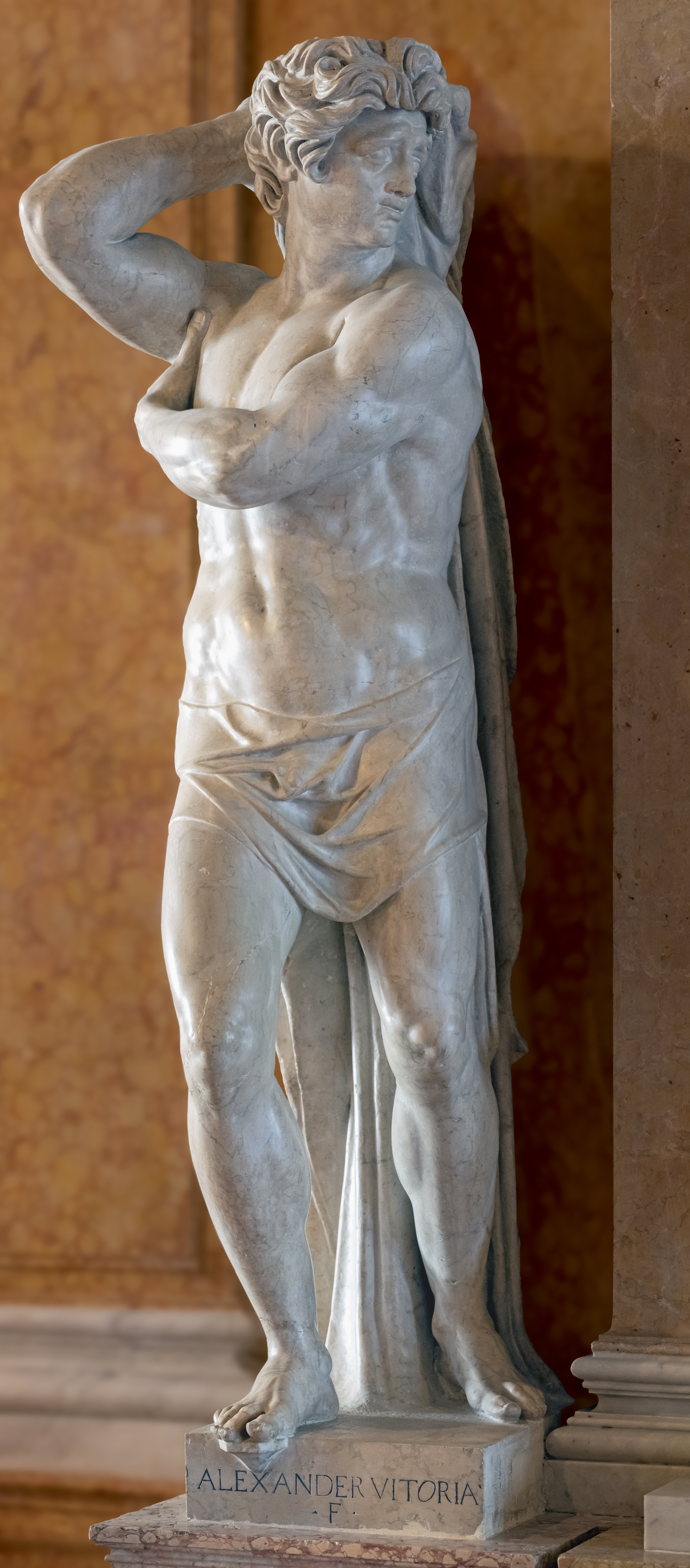
Atlas by Alessandro Vittoria

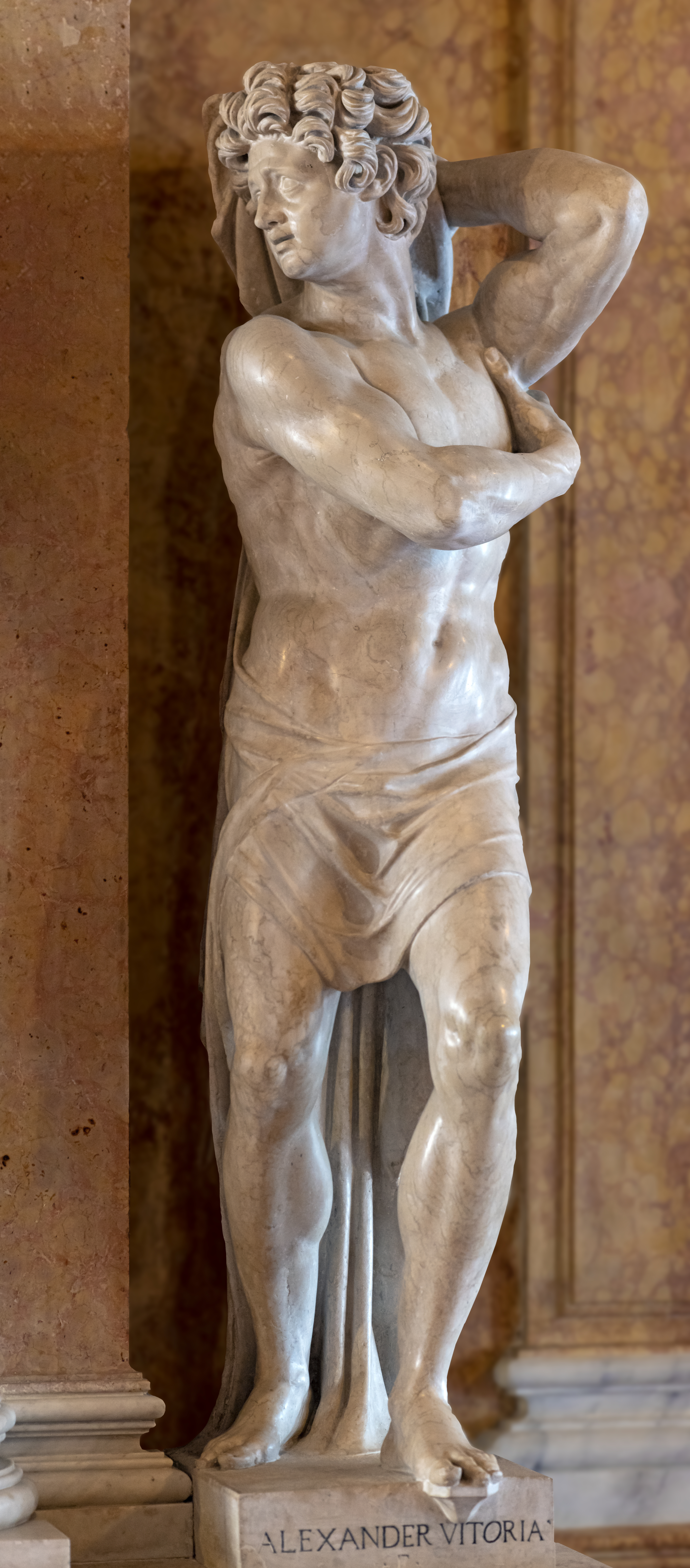
Atlas by Alessandro Vittoria

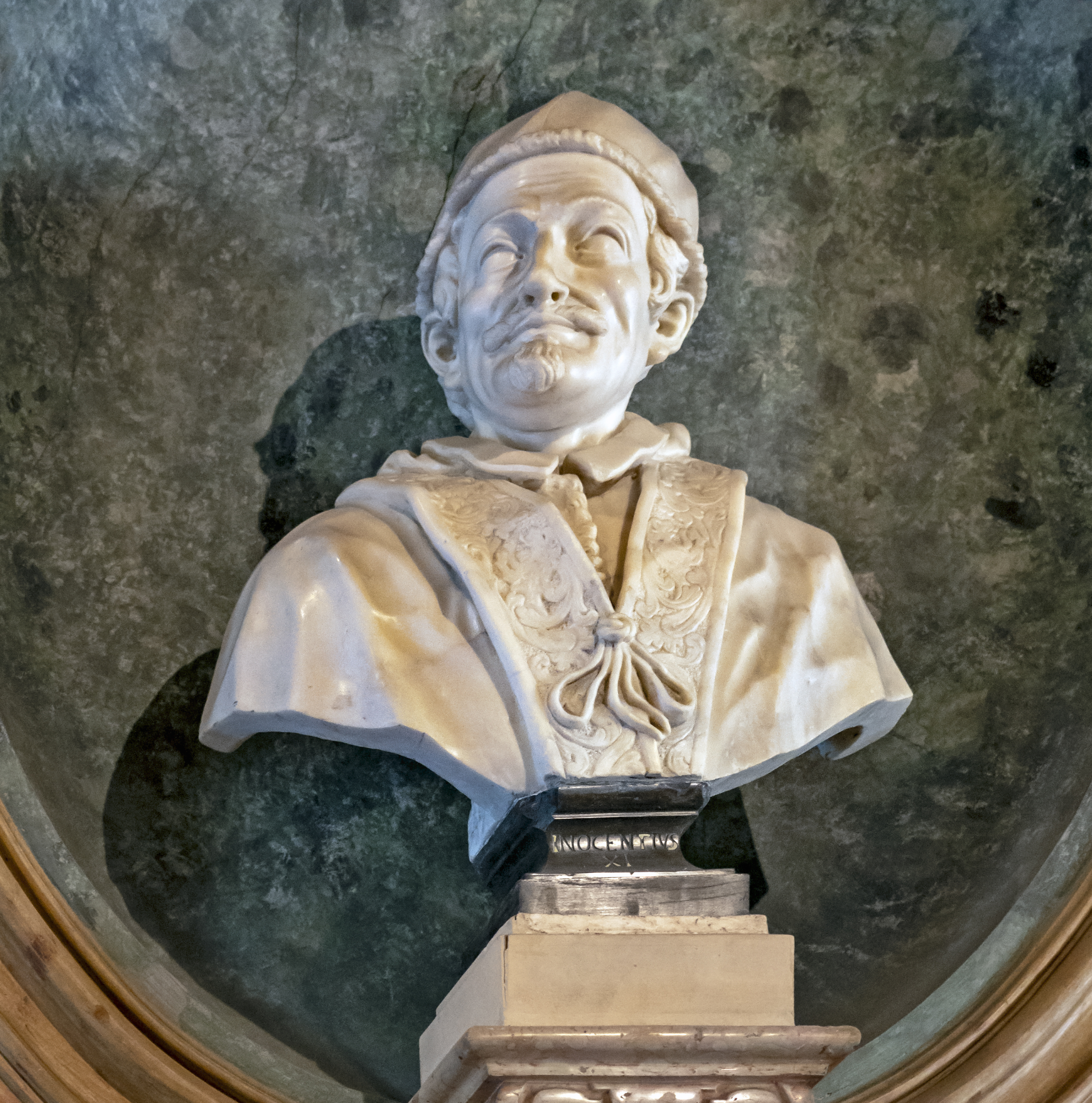
Bust of the Pope Innocent XI

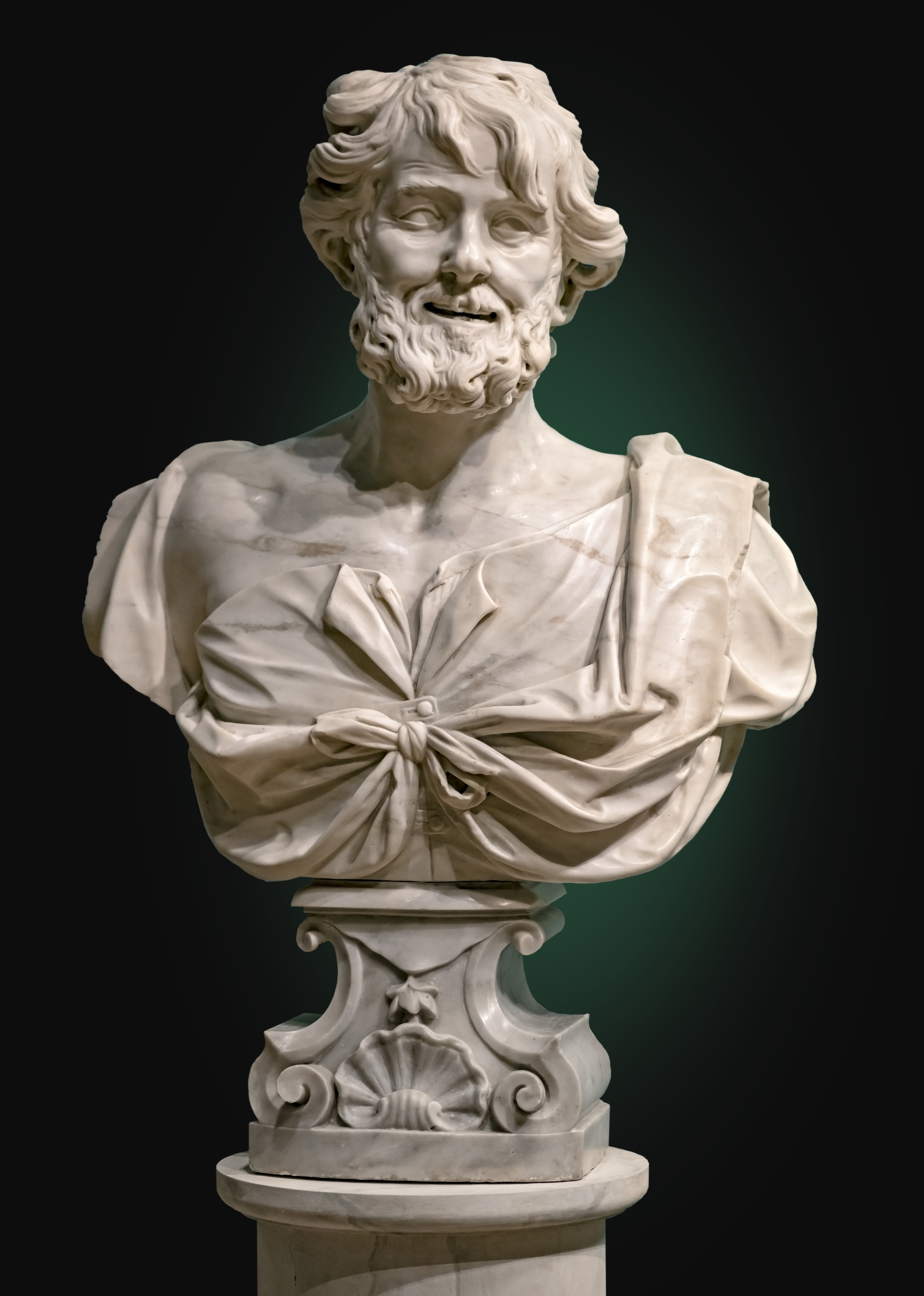
Democritus by Giuseppe Torretti

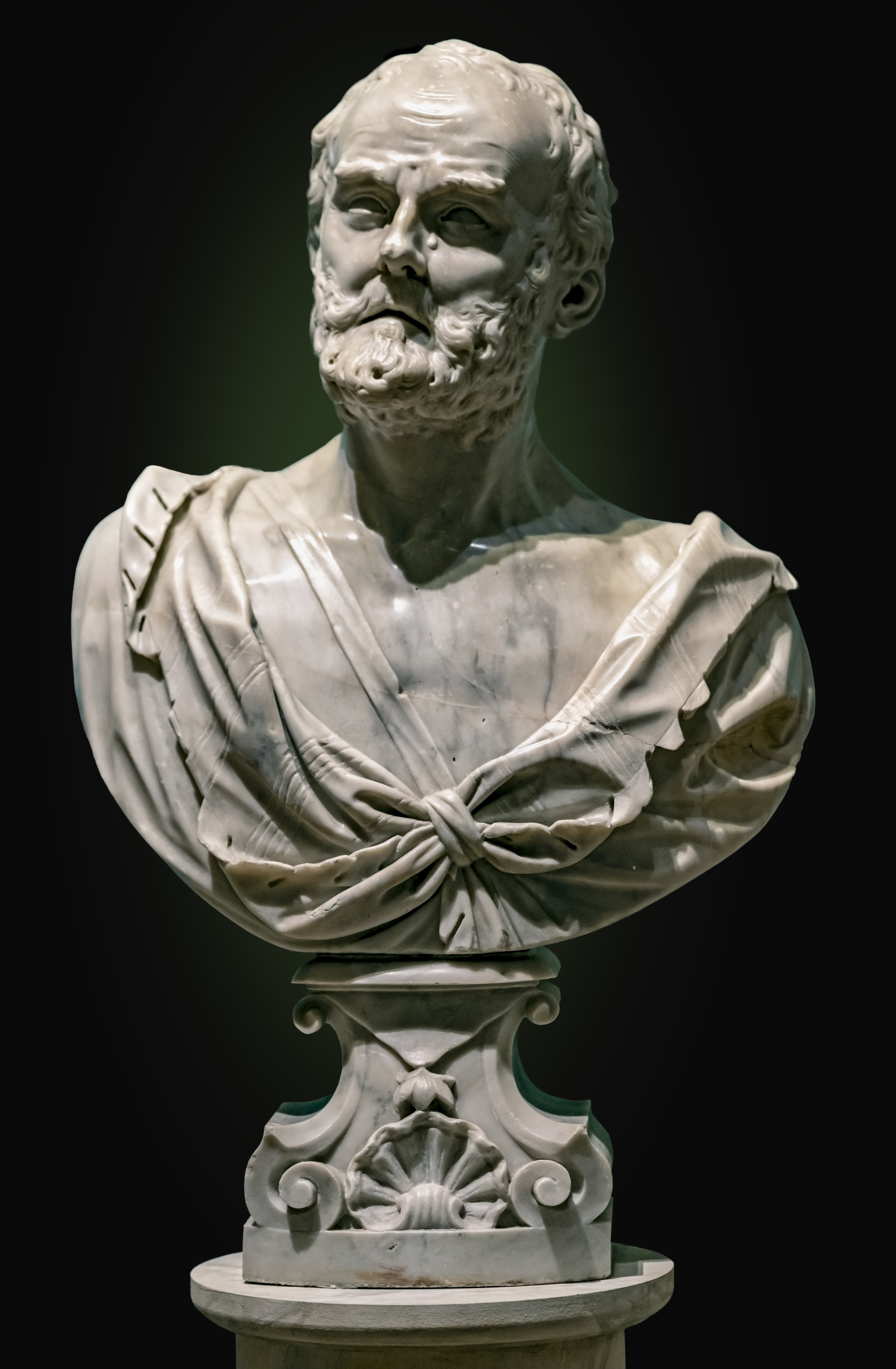
Heraclitus by Giuseppe Torretti

== Second floor galleries ==
=== Portego paintings ===
The second (third, in U.S. use), or upper floor, contains a series of galleries displaying Venetian paintings and decorative arts from the 18th century. Several major paintings by Canaletto are on display, including Architectural Caprice and two views of the Grand Canal, painted in 1719-20 during his youth. They marked the beginning of his famous series of Venice scenes. They were purchased for the museum by the City of Venice in 1983. Another large-scale depiction of the port The festival of Saint Martha by Gaspare Diziani, is also on display, along with several celebrated scenes of life in Venice during the period by Francesco Guardi.

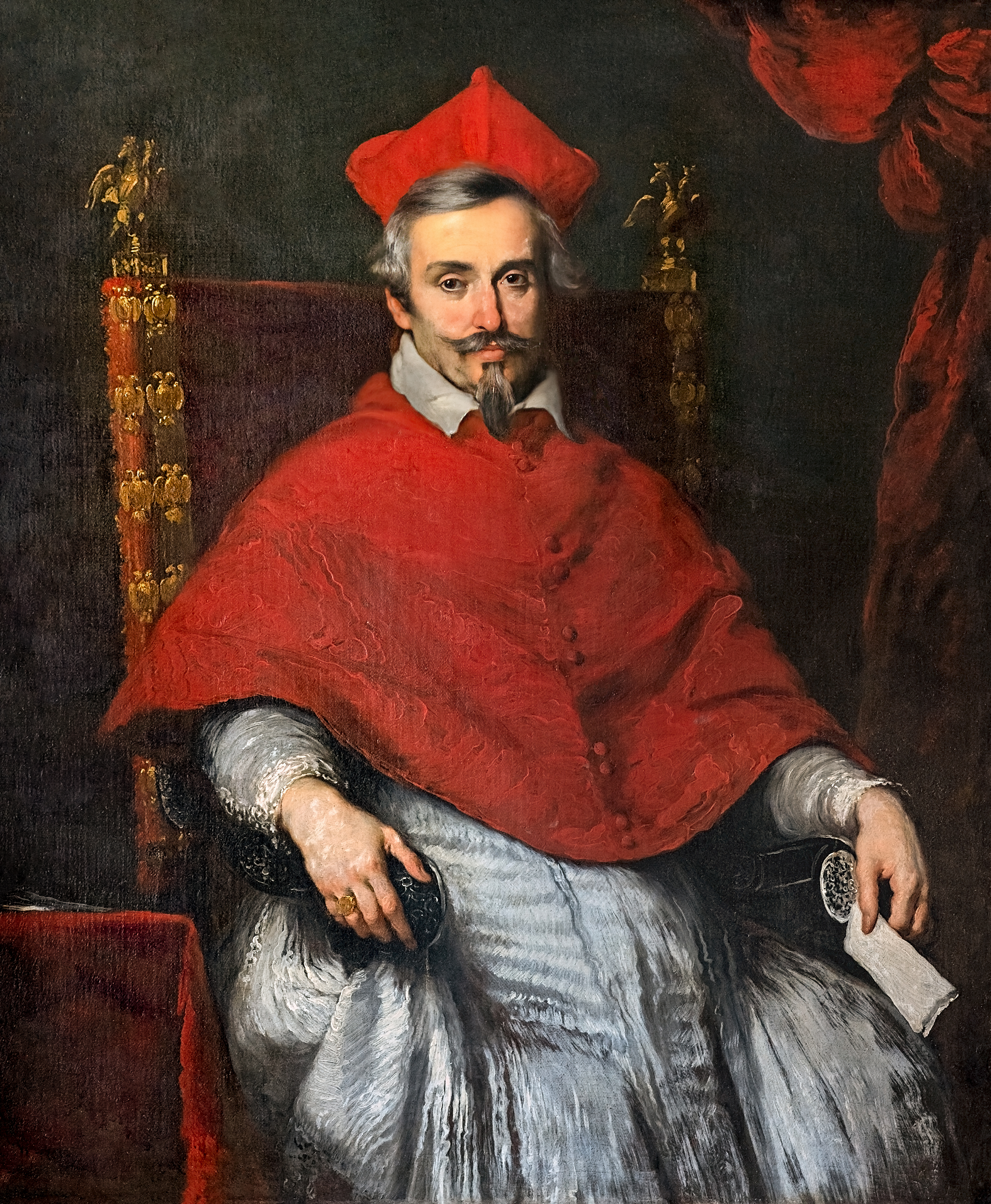
Ritratto del cardinale Federico Corner - Bernardo Strozzi

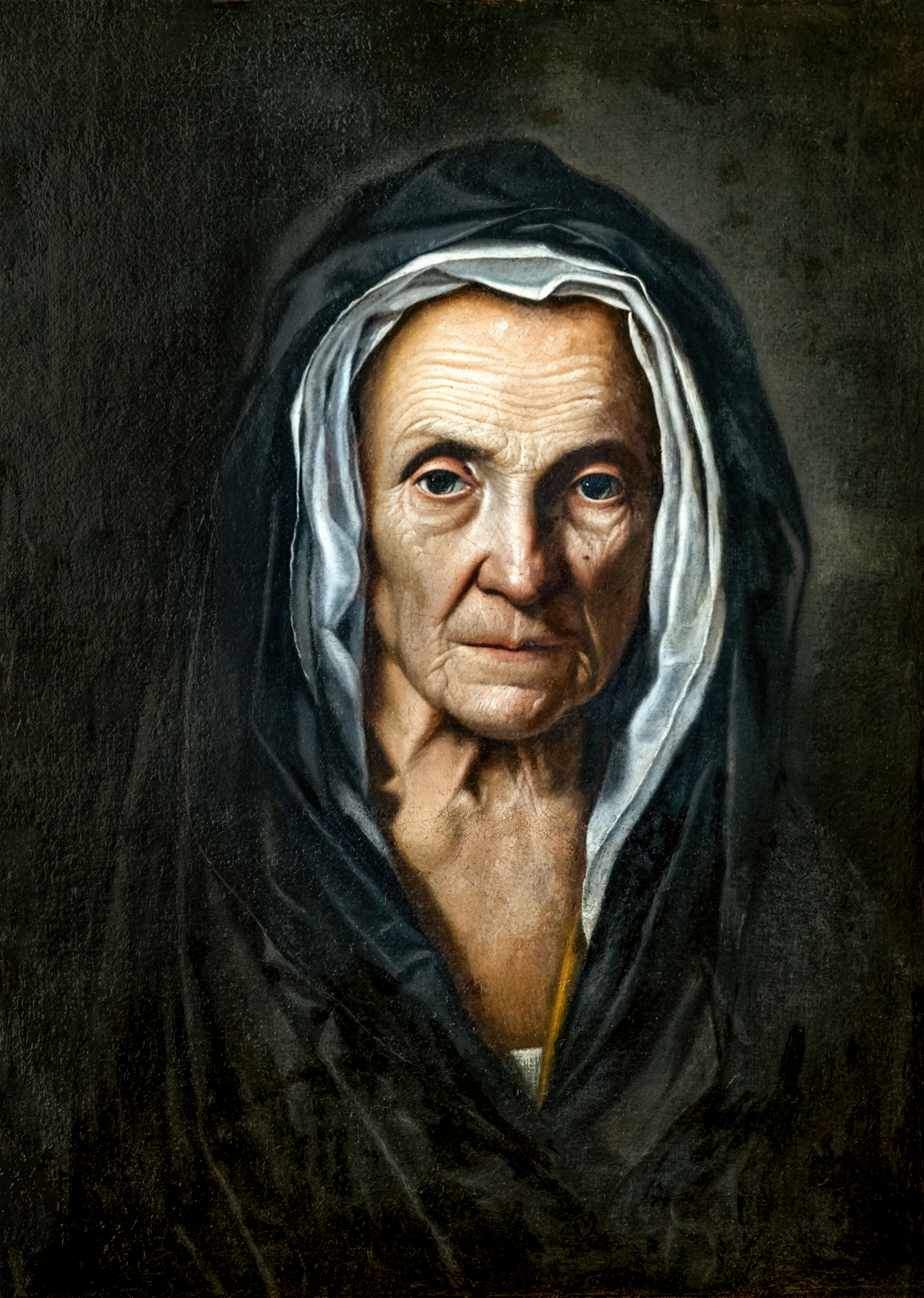
Ritratto di vecchia - Pietro Bellotti

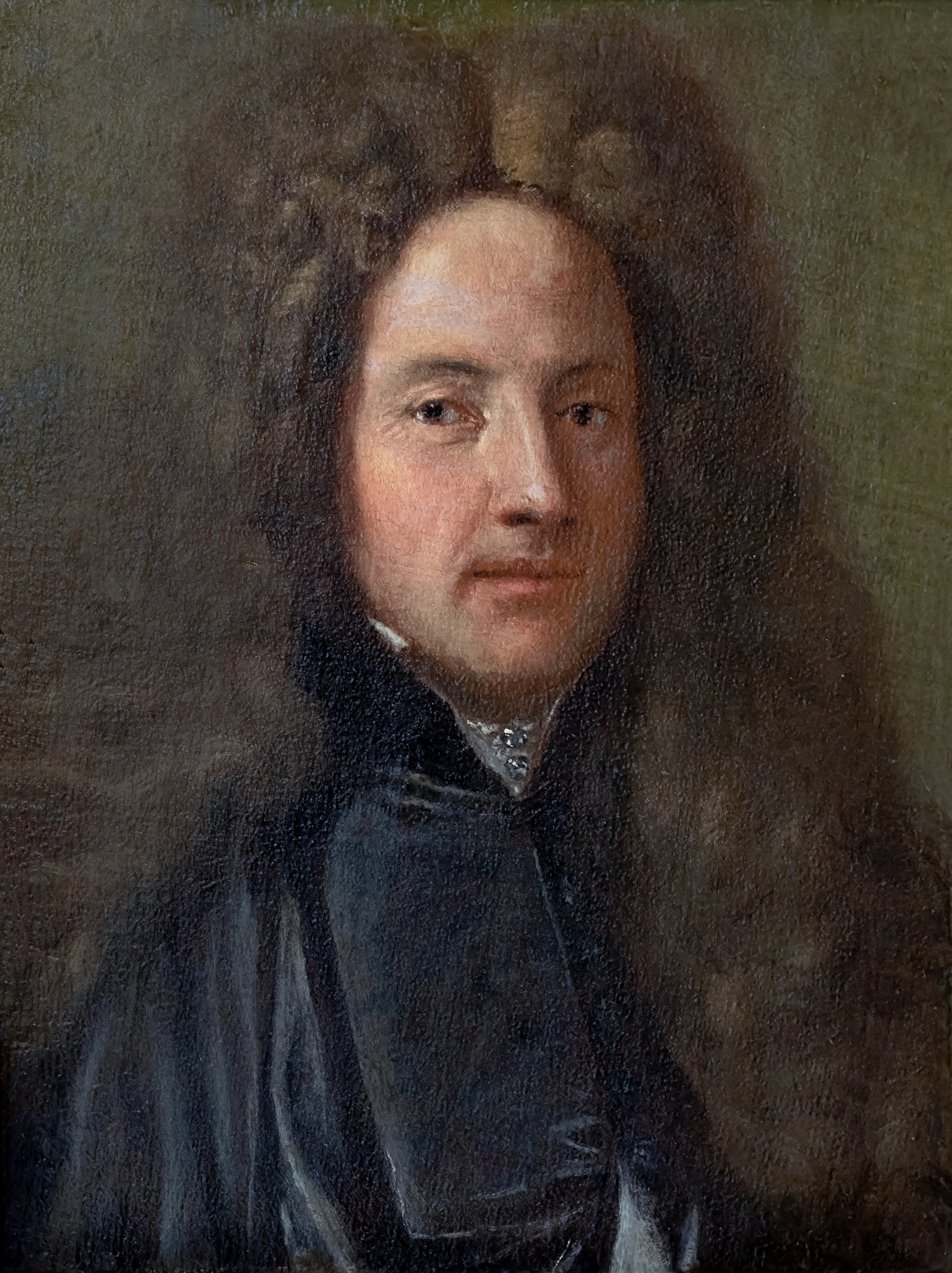
Ritratto di gentiluomo in parrucca - Sebastiano Bombelli

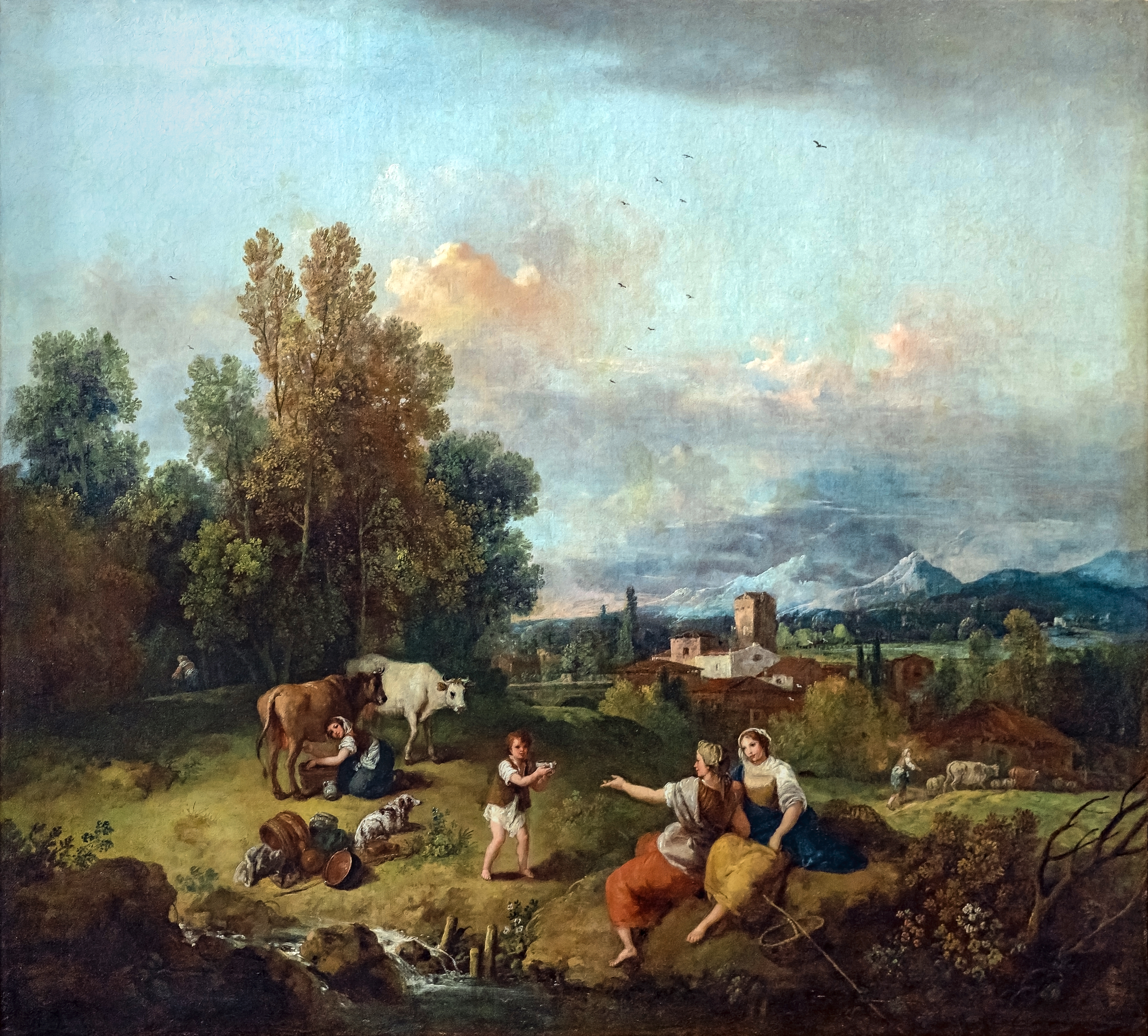
Pastorale - Francesco Zuccarelli

La Sagra di Santa Marta - Gaspare Diziani

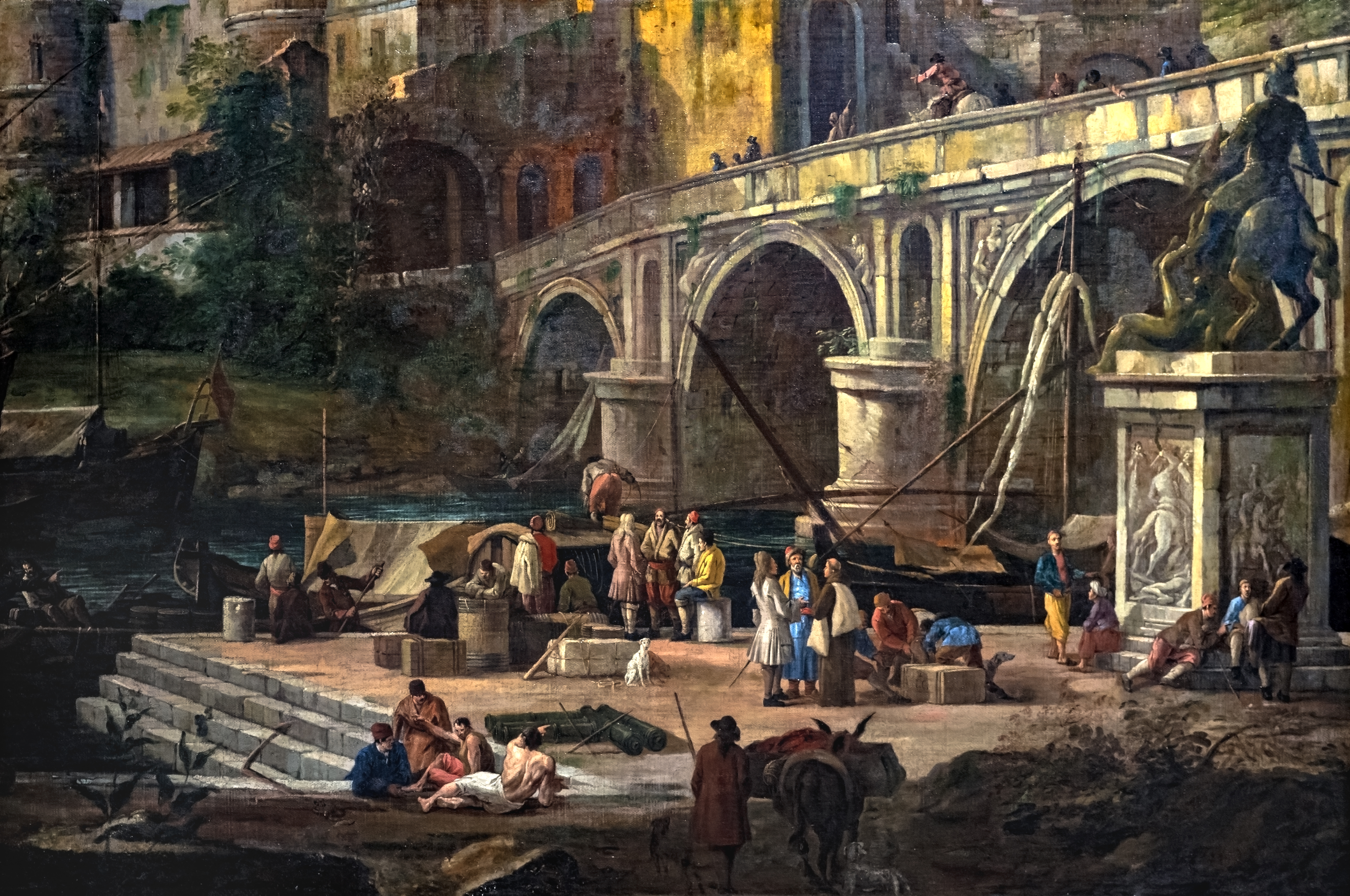
Veduta di porto fluviale - Luca Carlevarijs

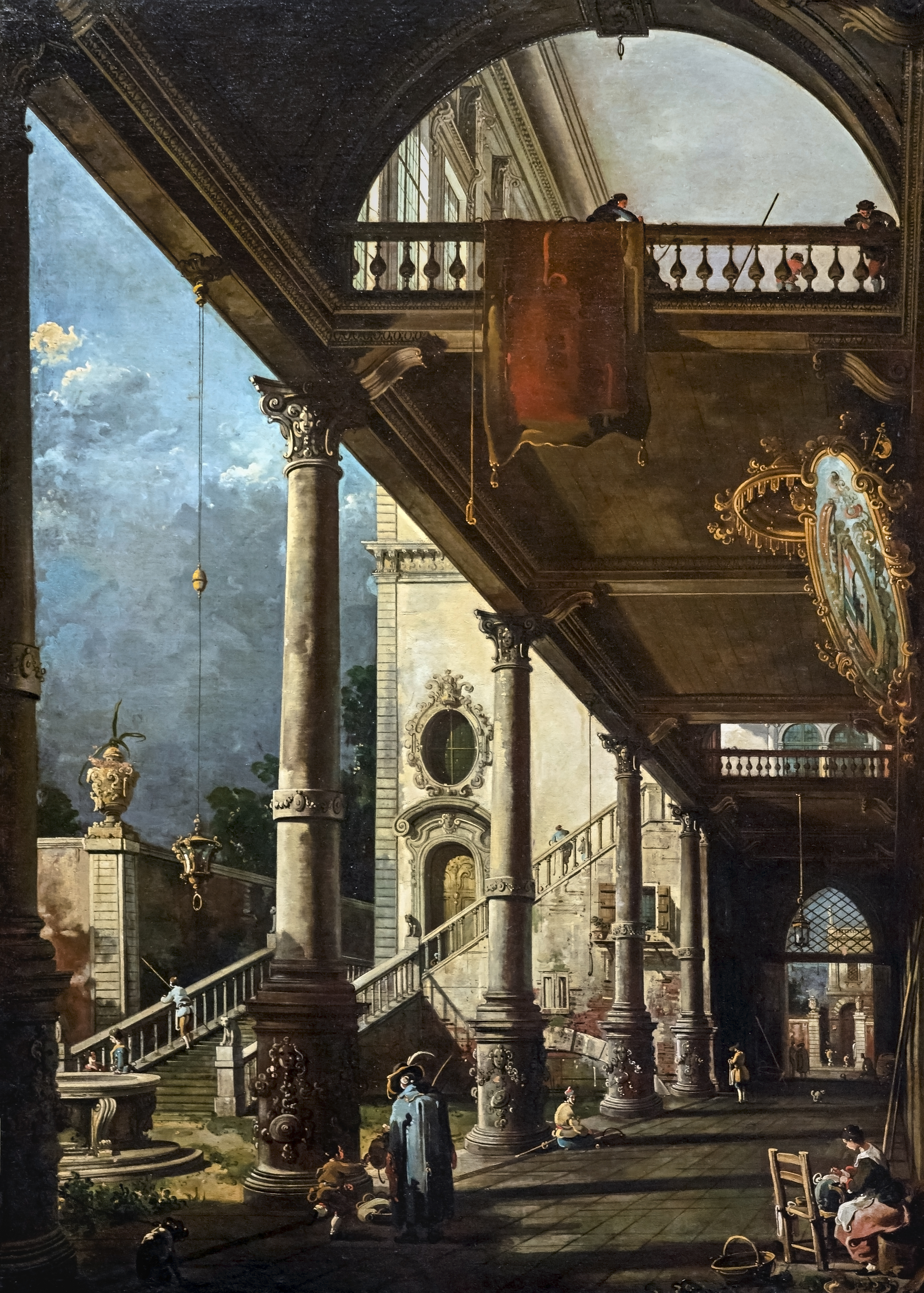
Prospettiva con portico - Giuseppe Moretti

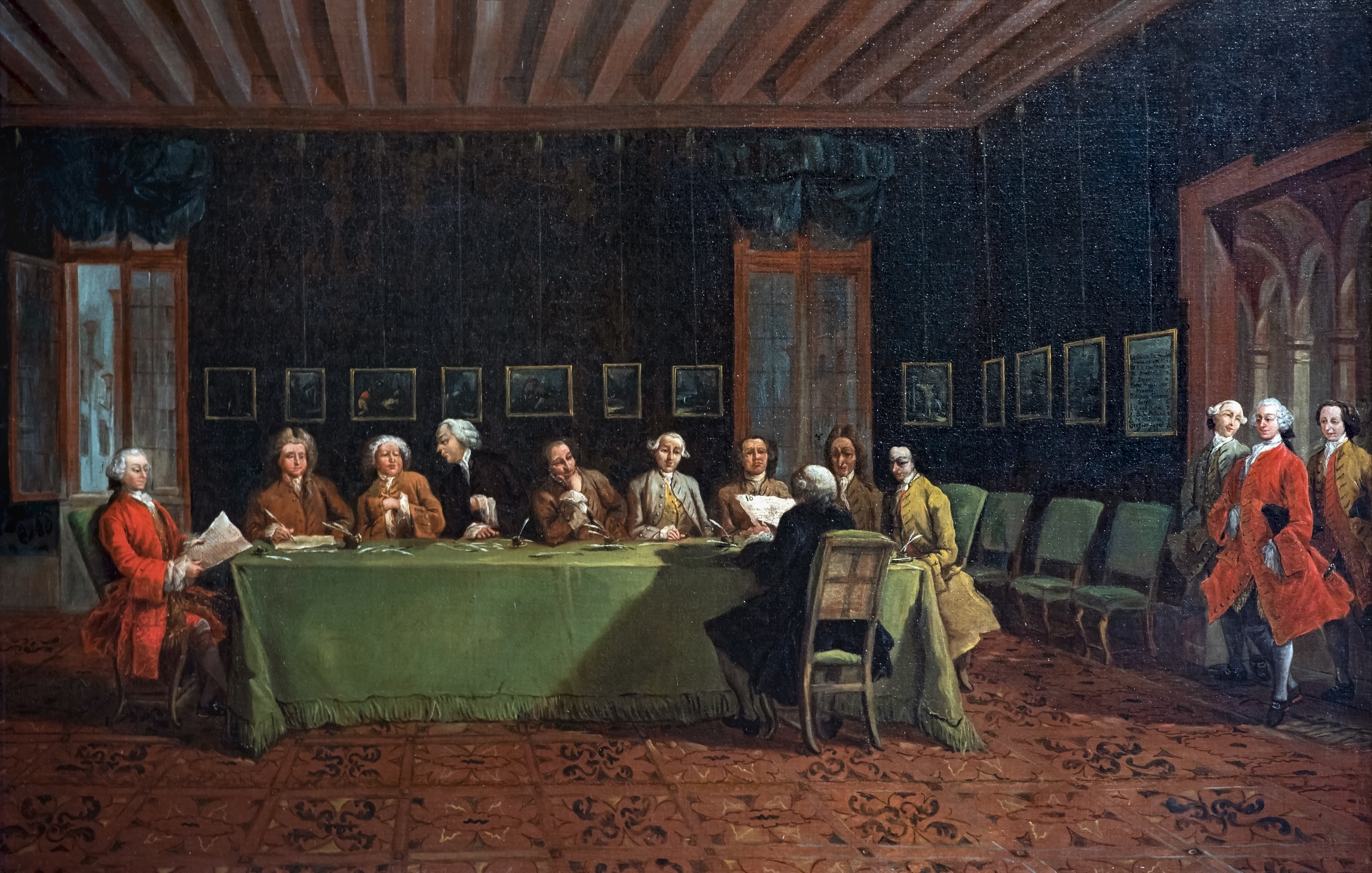
Il convegno diplomatico - Francesco Guardi

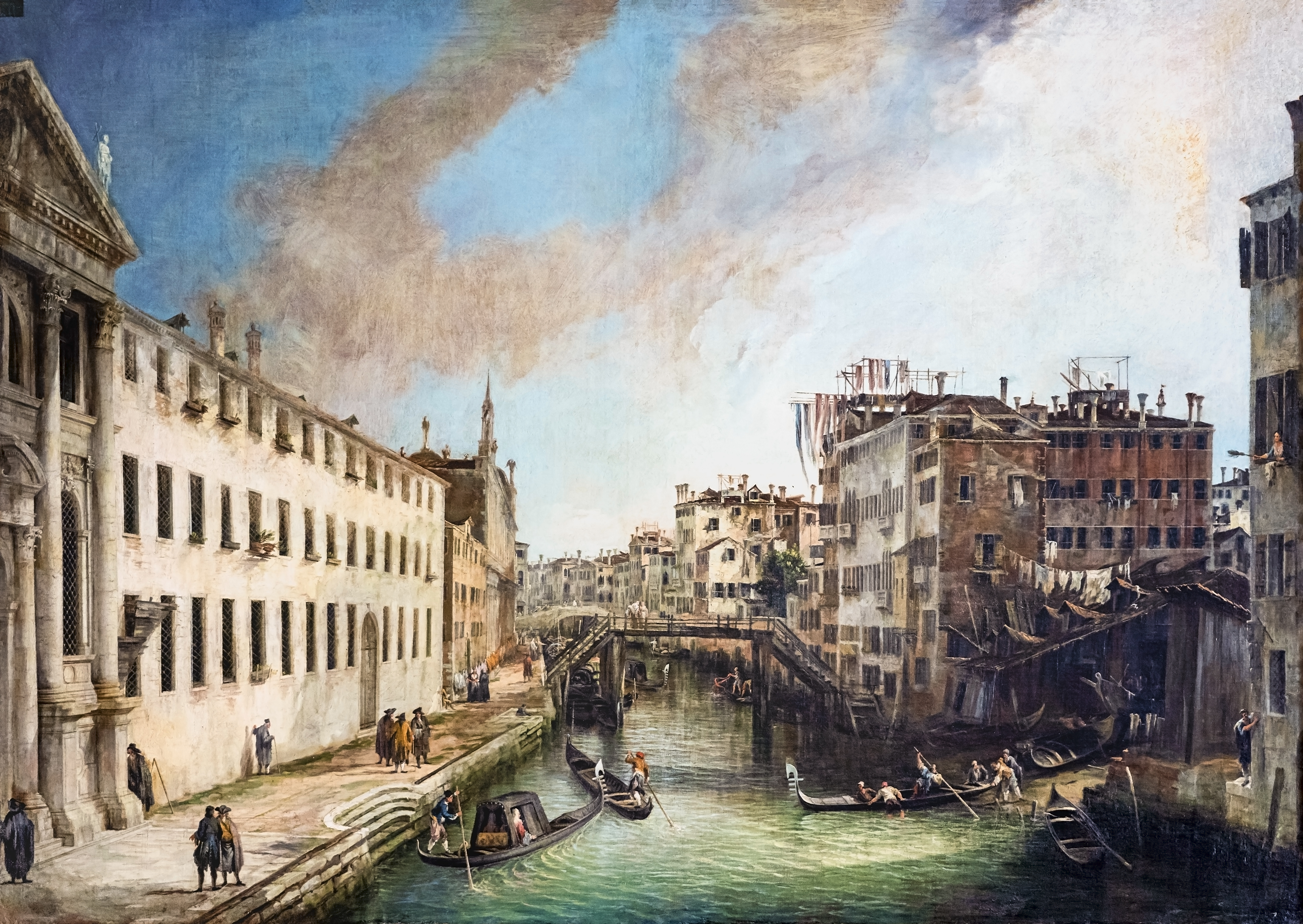
Il rio dei Mendicanti - Canaletto

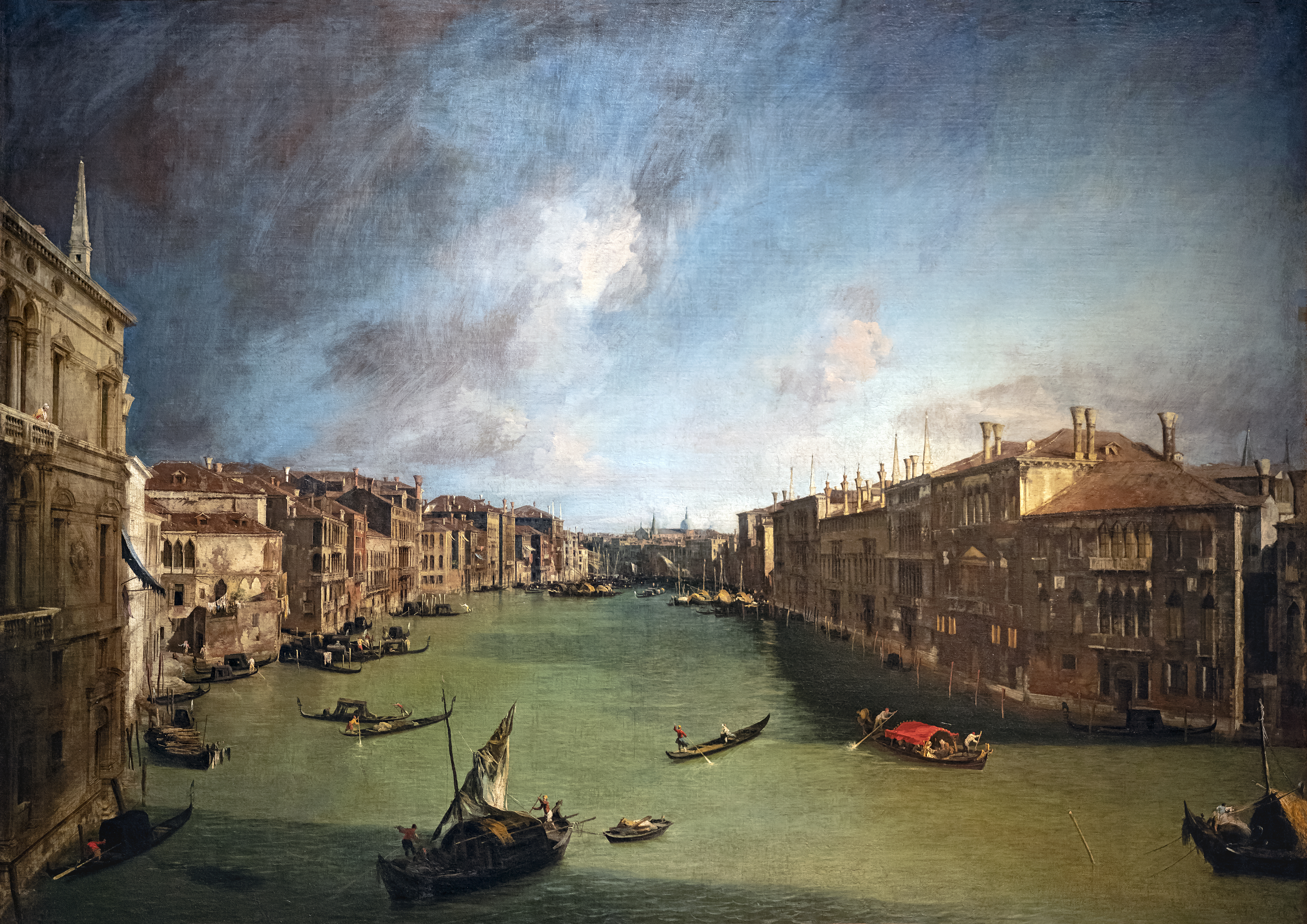
Canal Grande da Palazzo Balbi a Rialto - Canaletto

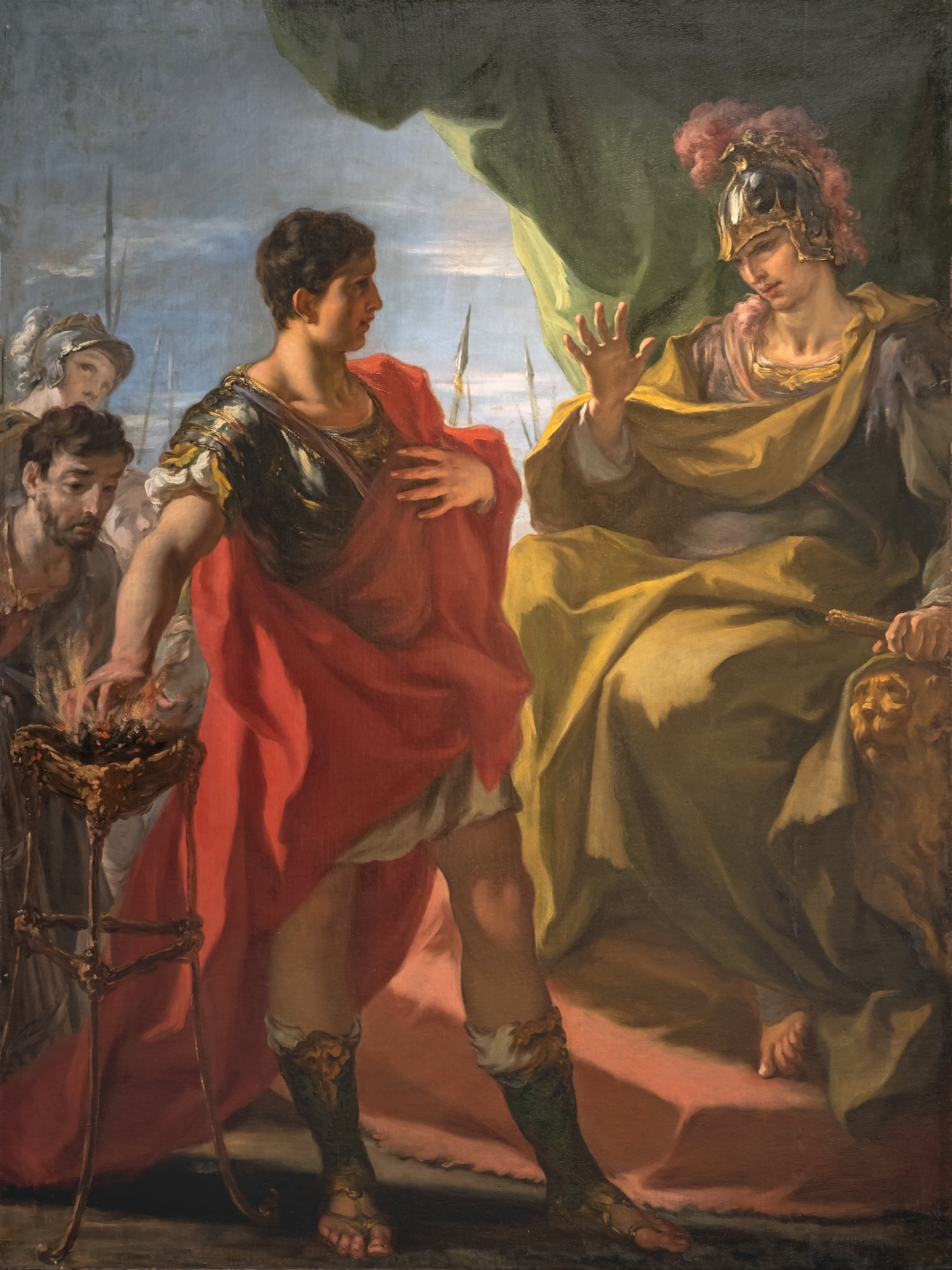
Mucius Scaevola in front of Porsenna - Giovanni Antonio Pellegrini

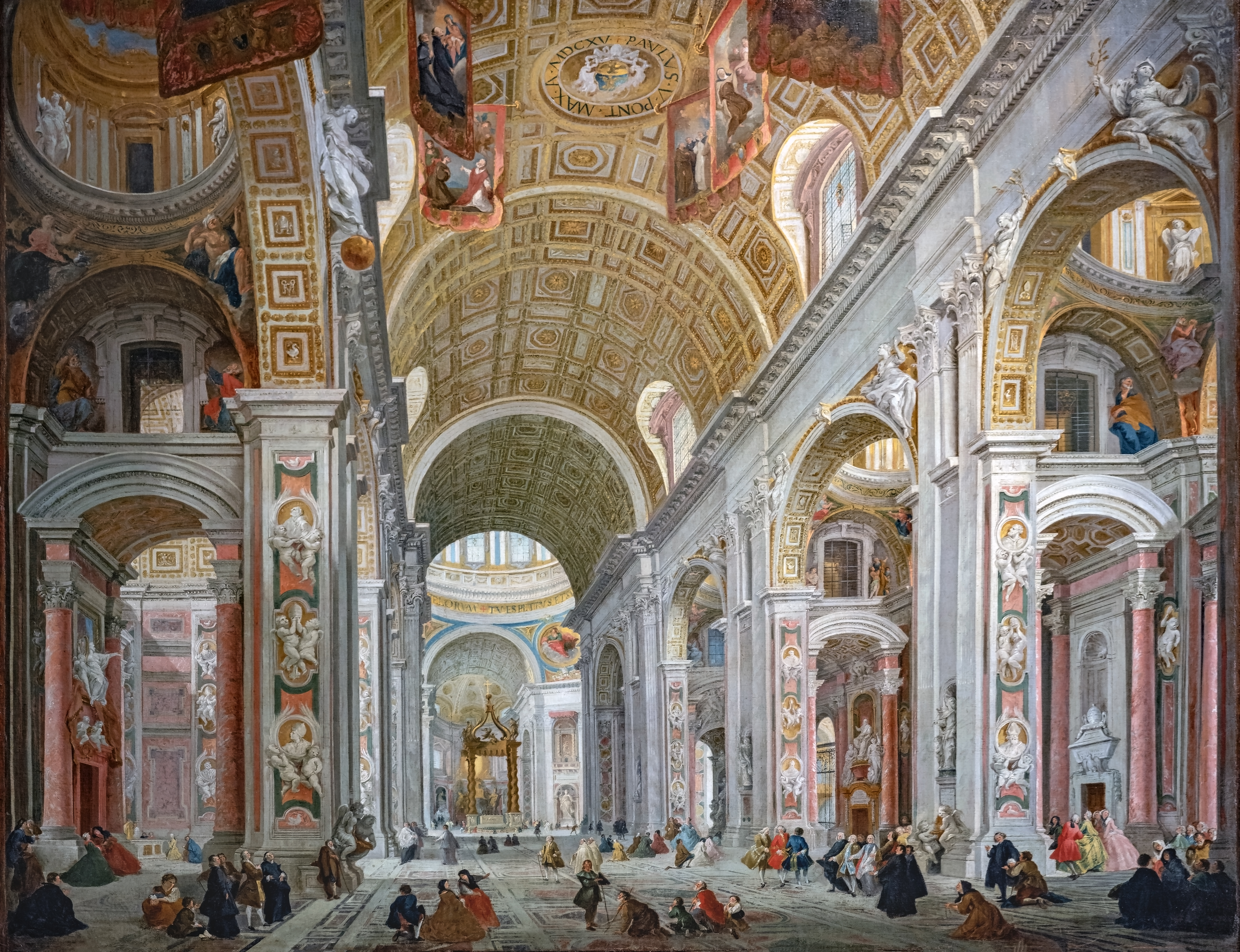
Interno della basilica di San Pietro a Roma - Giovanni Paolo Panini

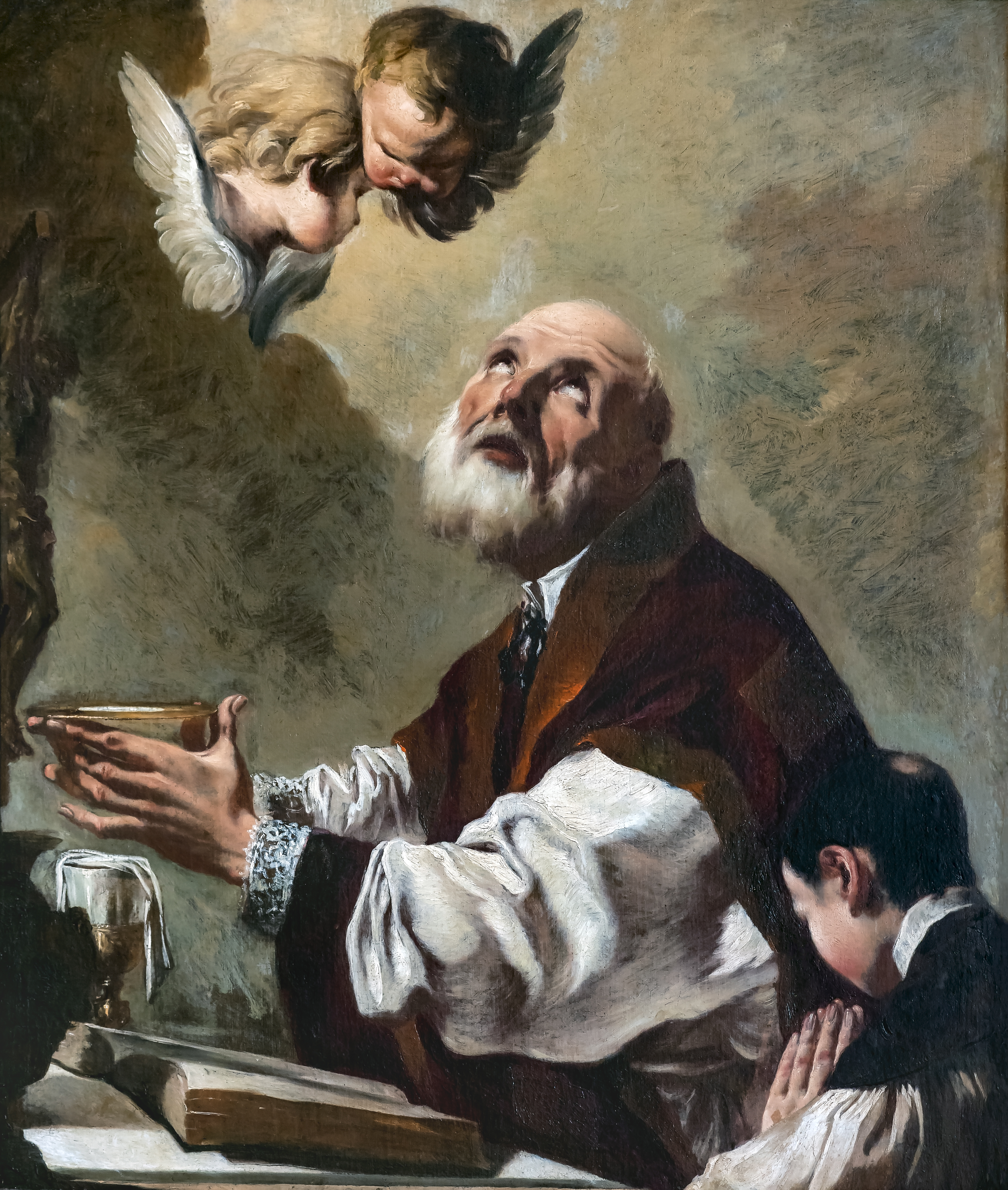
La comunione di San Filippo Neri - Giuseppe Angeli

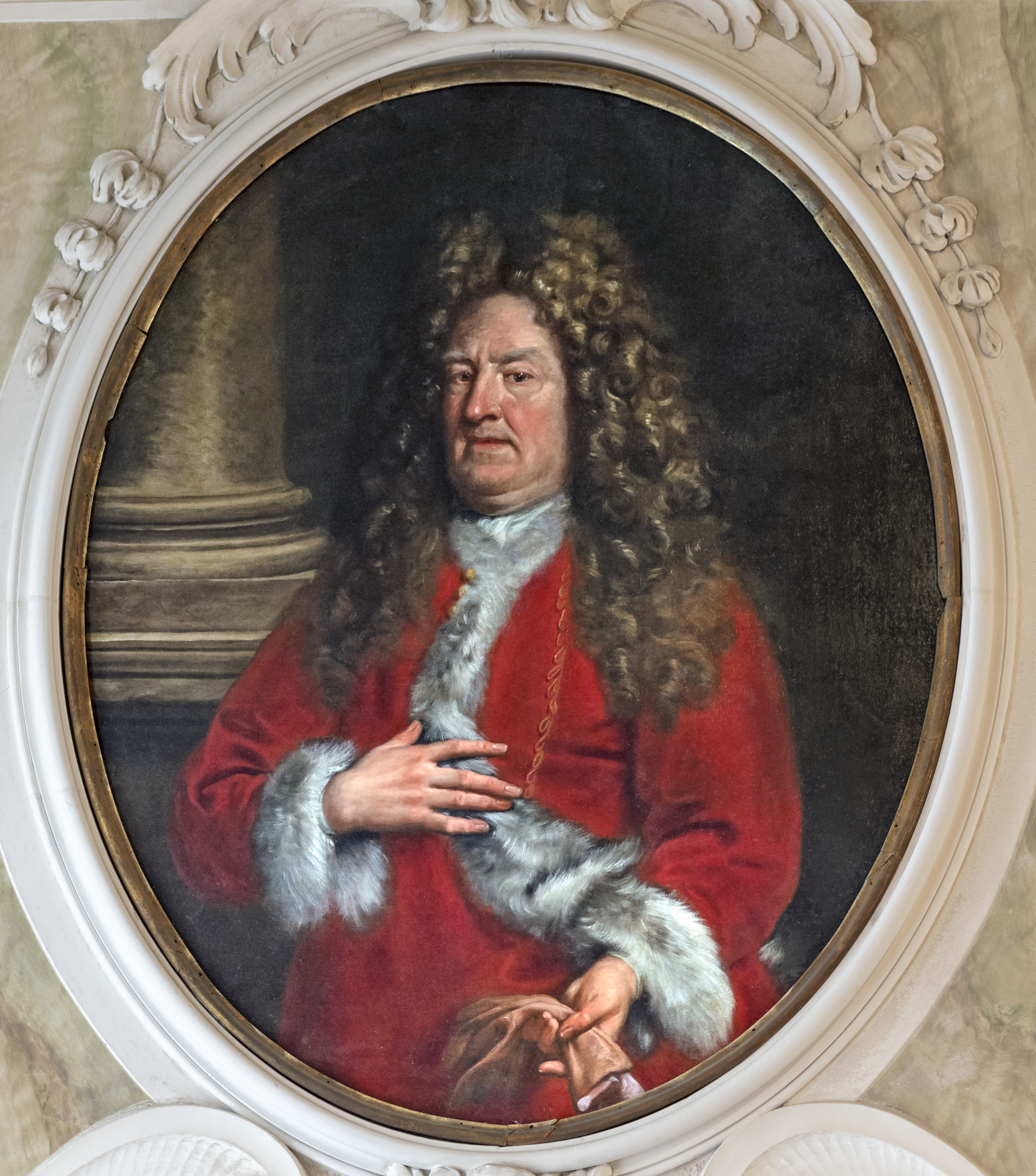
Ritratto di gentiluomo in rosso - Niccolò Cassana

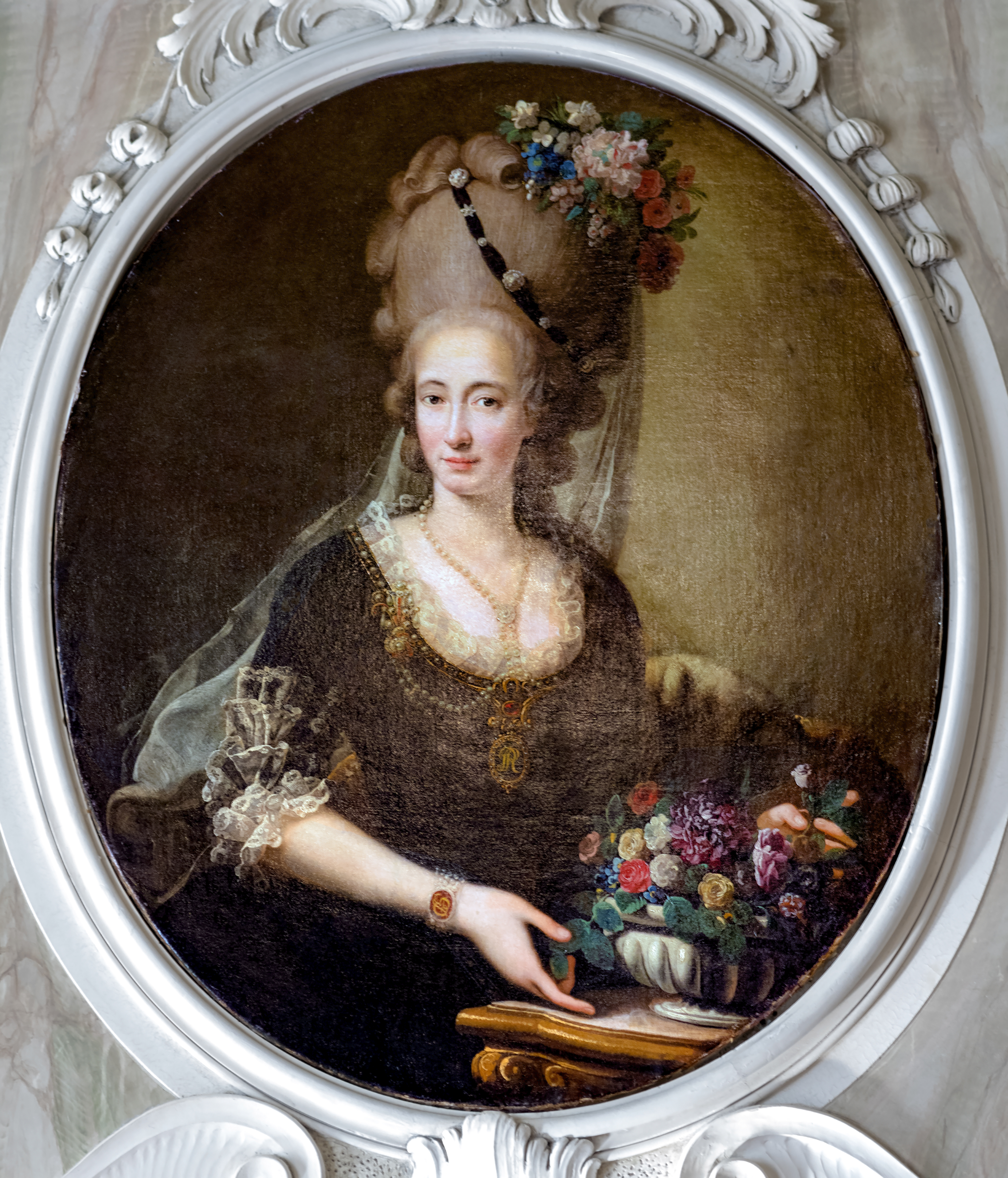
Giustina Donà dalle Rose - Lodovico Gallina

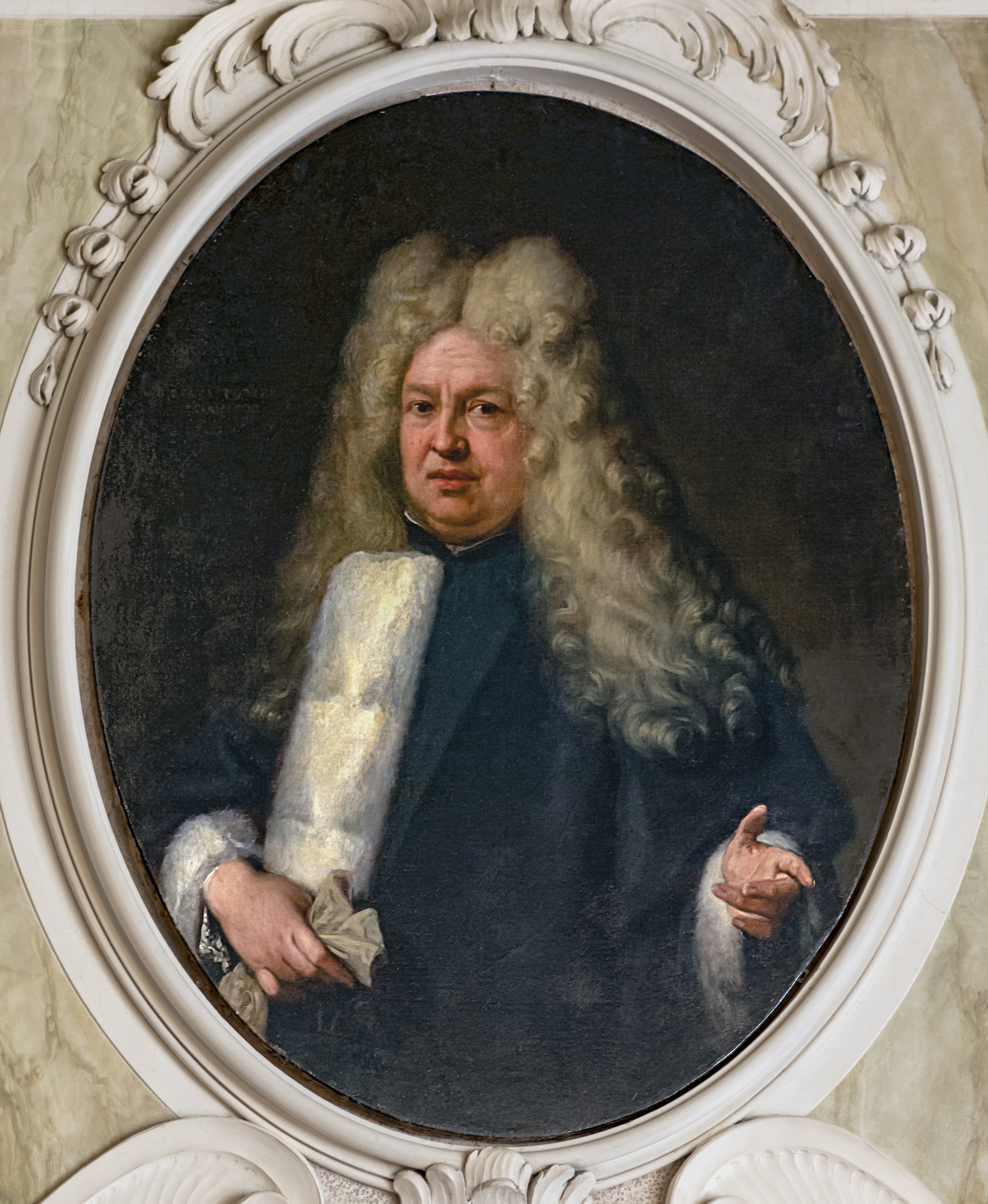
Ritratto del Senatore Giovanni Correr - Antonio Bellucci

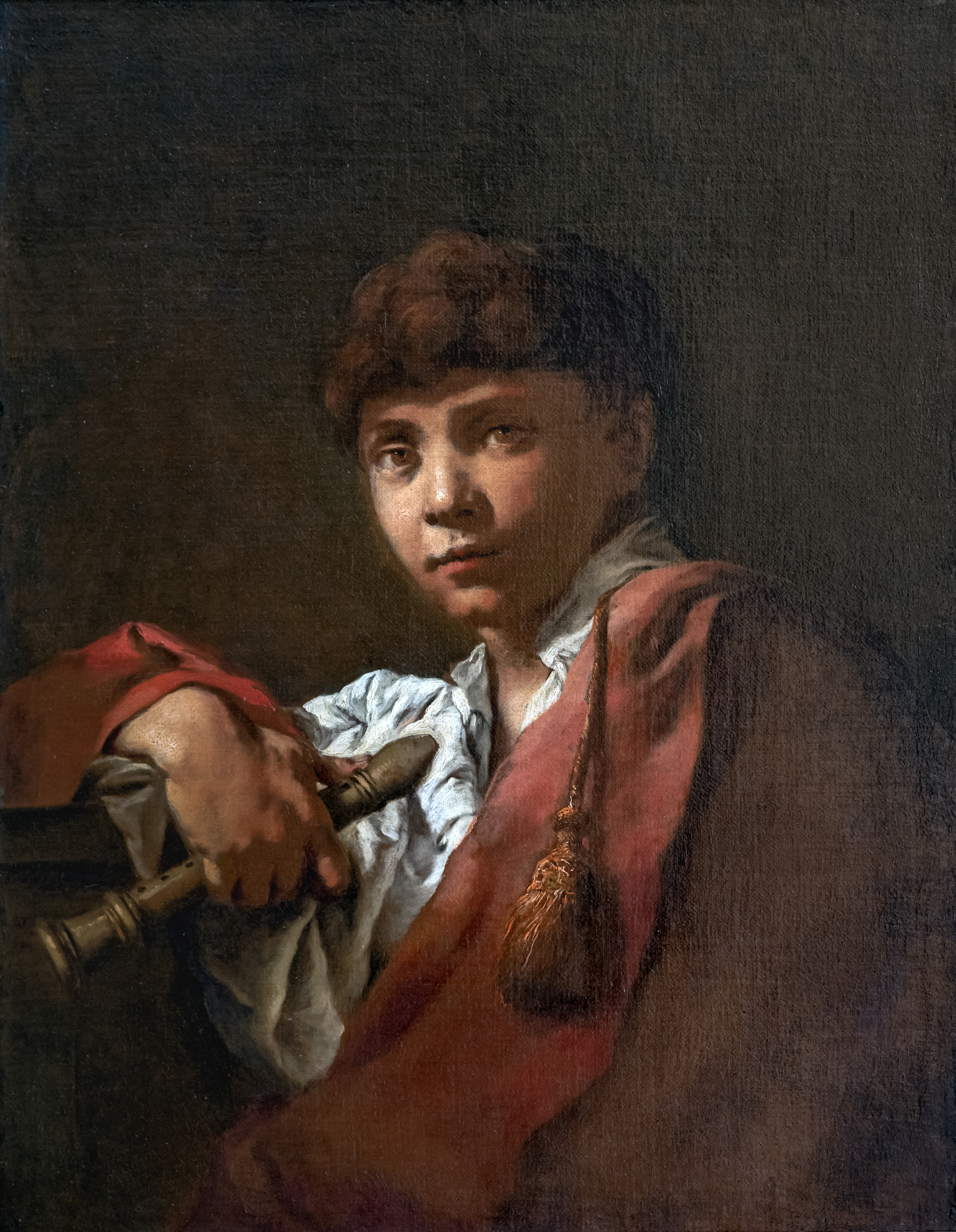
Ragazzo con piffero - Domenico Maggiotto

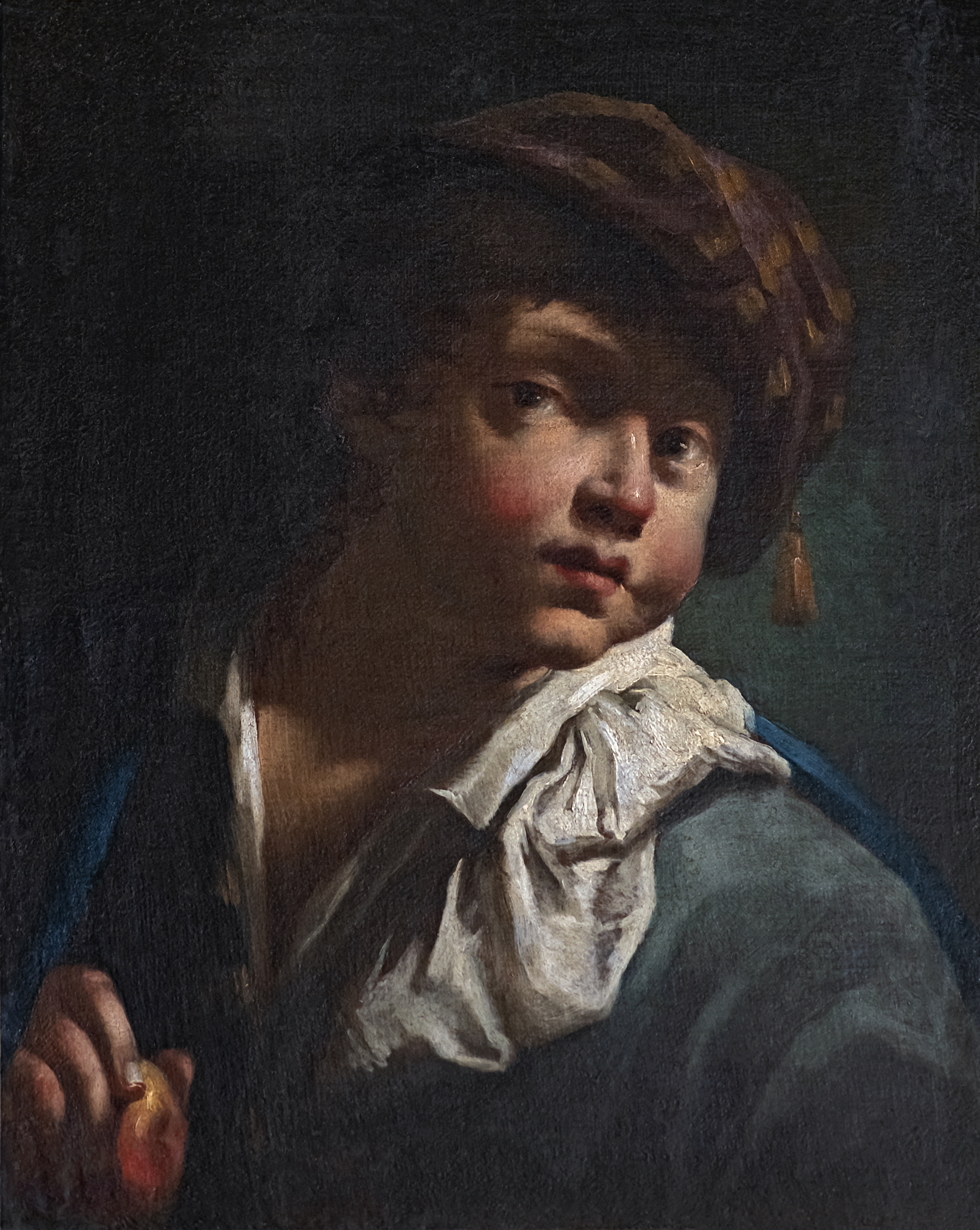
Ragazzo con mela - Antonio Marinetti

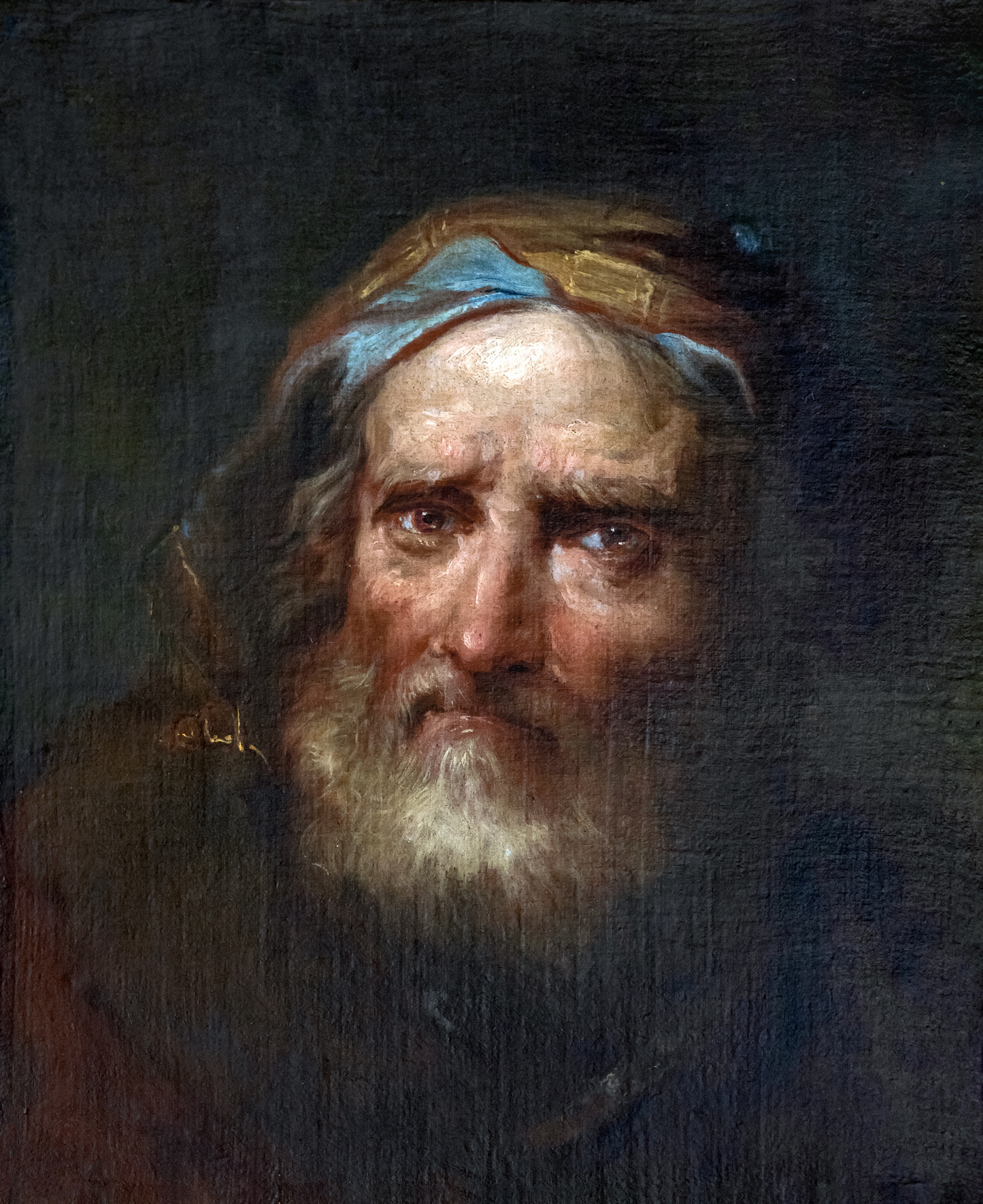
Testa di vecchio barbuto - Giuseppe Nogari

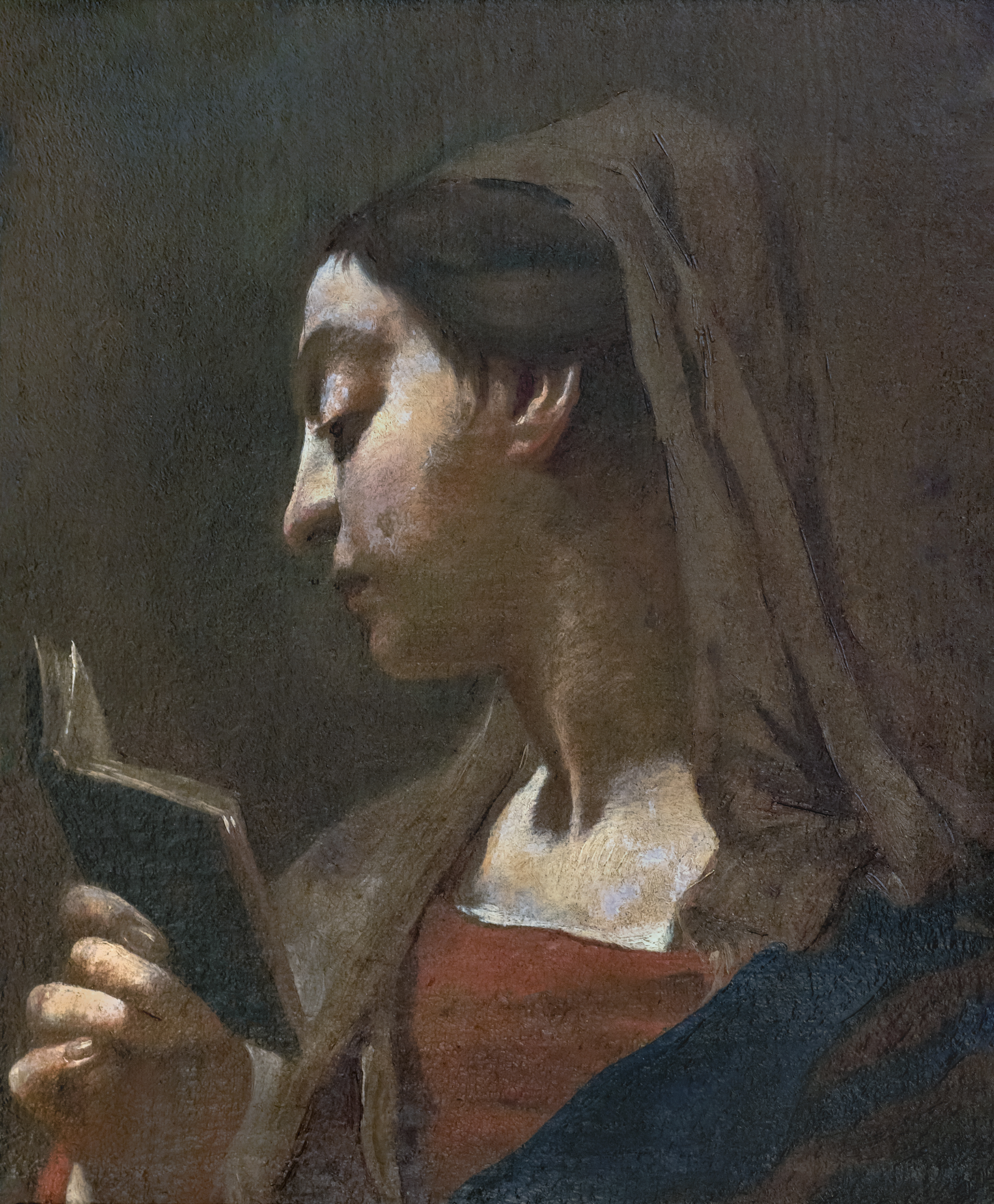
Madonna leggente - Francesco Capella

=== Parlor Room ===
The Parlor Hall takes its name from Francesco Guardi's painting: The Parlor of the Nuns at San Zaccaria (1740-1745) exhibited in the hall with | The Foyer of Dandolo's palace in San Moisè. The fresco of the ceiling entitled: Conjugal Concorde crowned by Virtue in the presence of Justice, Prudence, Temperance, Fame, Abundance is a work of Costantino Cedini (Padua, 1741 - Venice, 1811), member of the Guild of the painters of Venice and professor at the Academy of Fine Arts of Venice. The fresco was originally in the palace Nani in Cannaregio. It was transferred in the 1930s to its current location. The frame surrounding the fresco is older than a century ago and is due to the quadraturist Antonio Felice Ferrari (1667 - 1720).

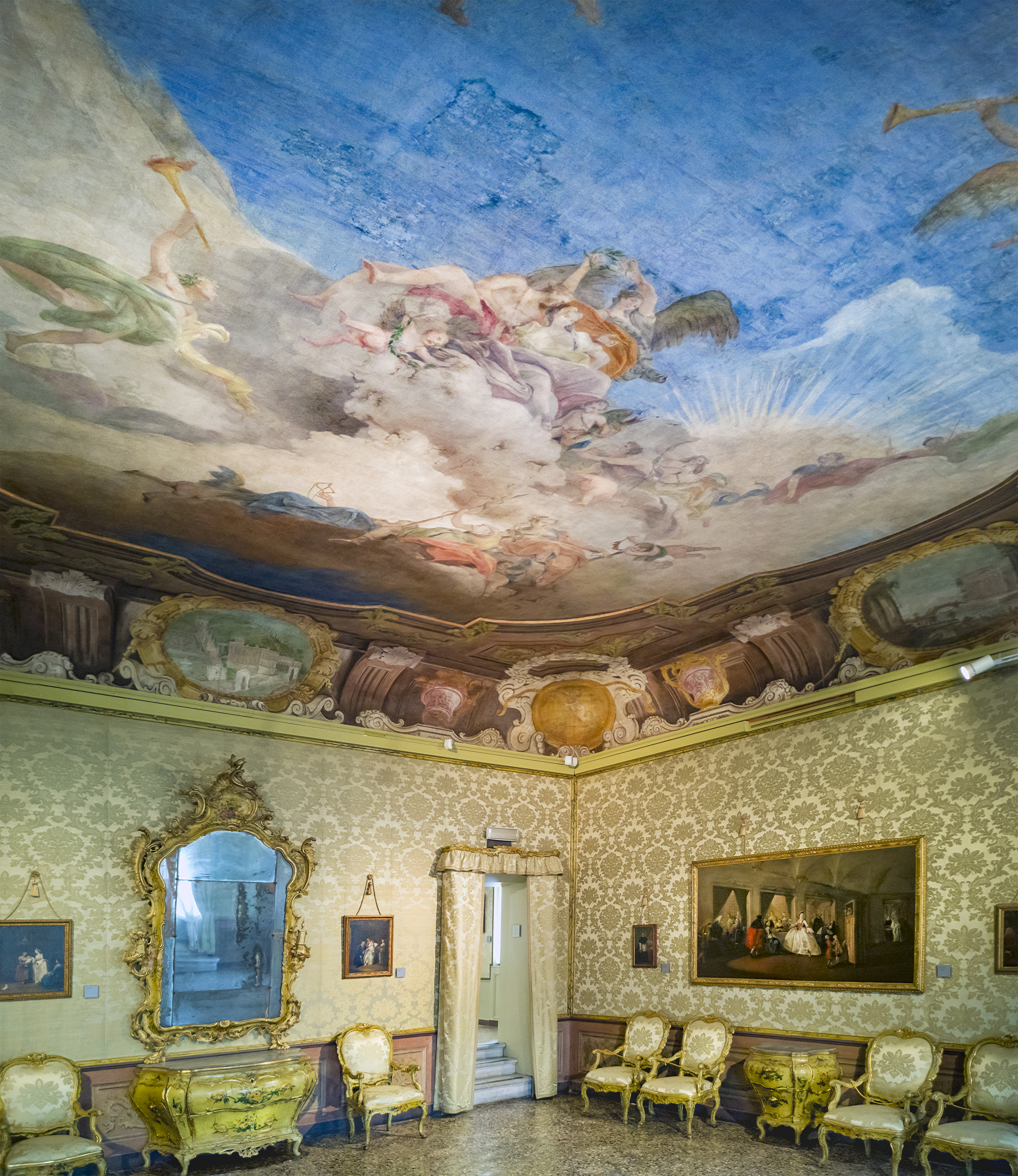
The room with Francesco Guardi's famous painting

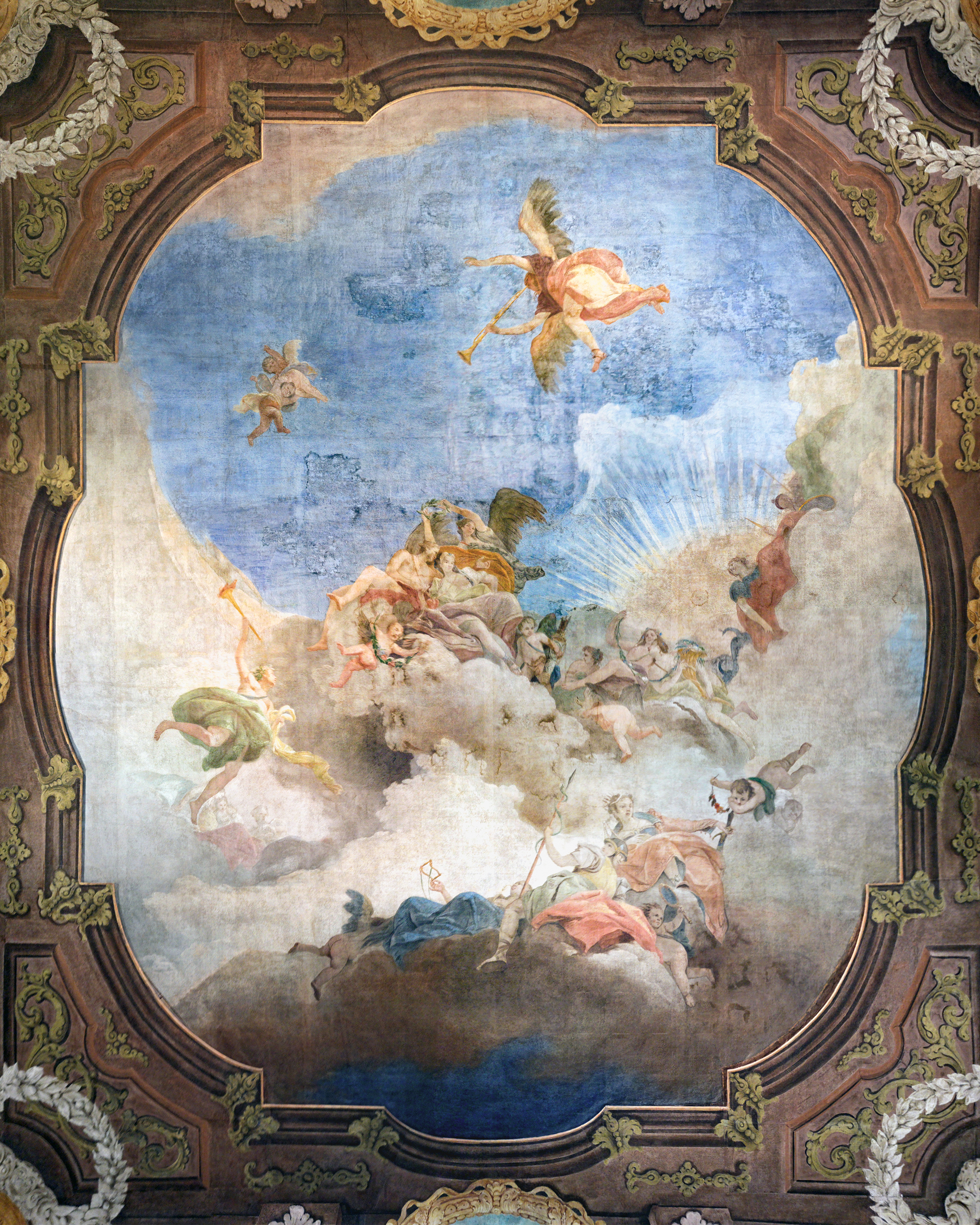
The fresco of Costantino Cedini

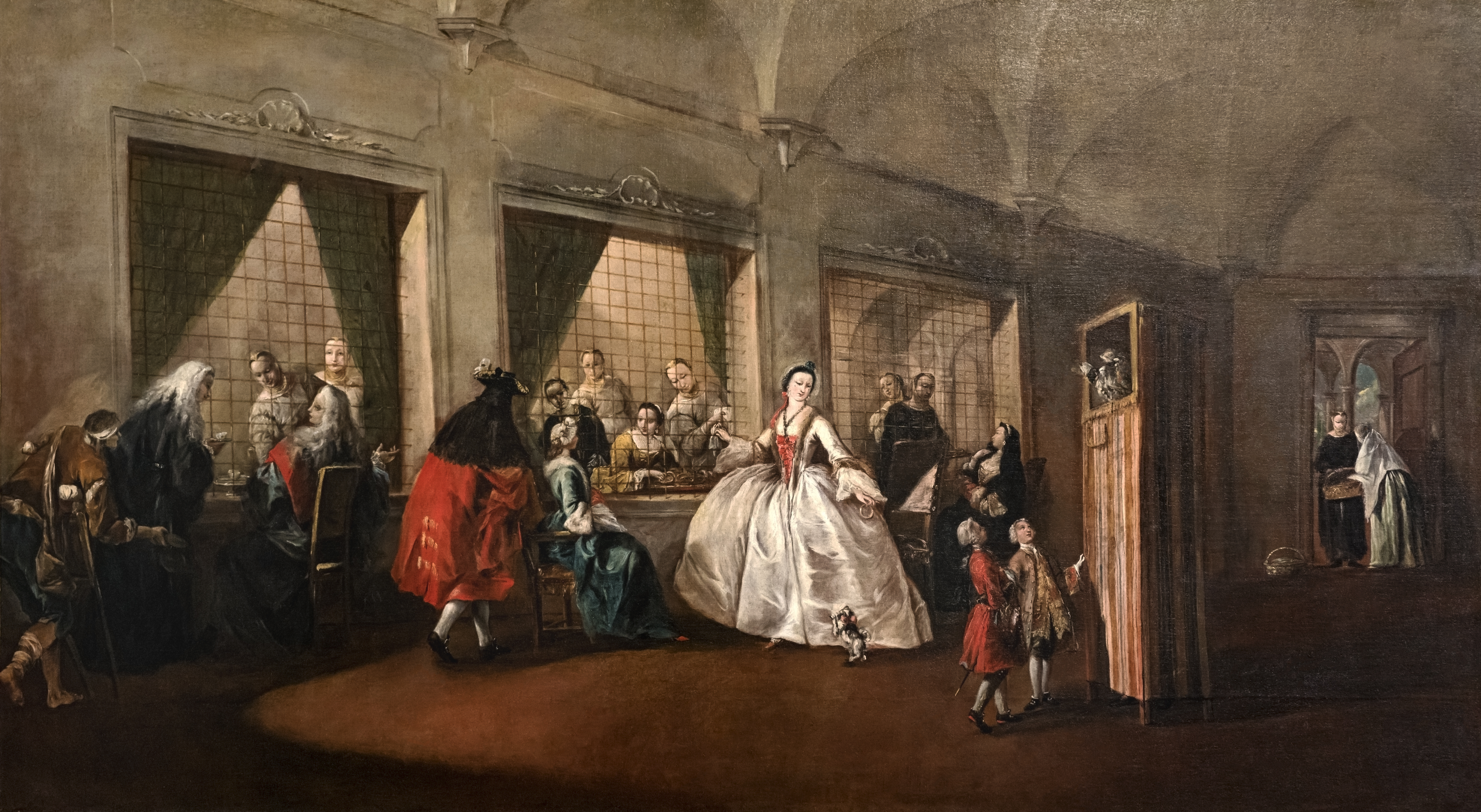
The Parlor of the Nuns at San Zaccaria by Francesco Guardi

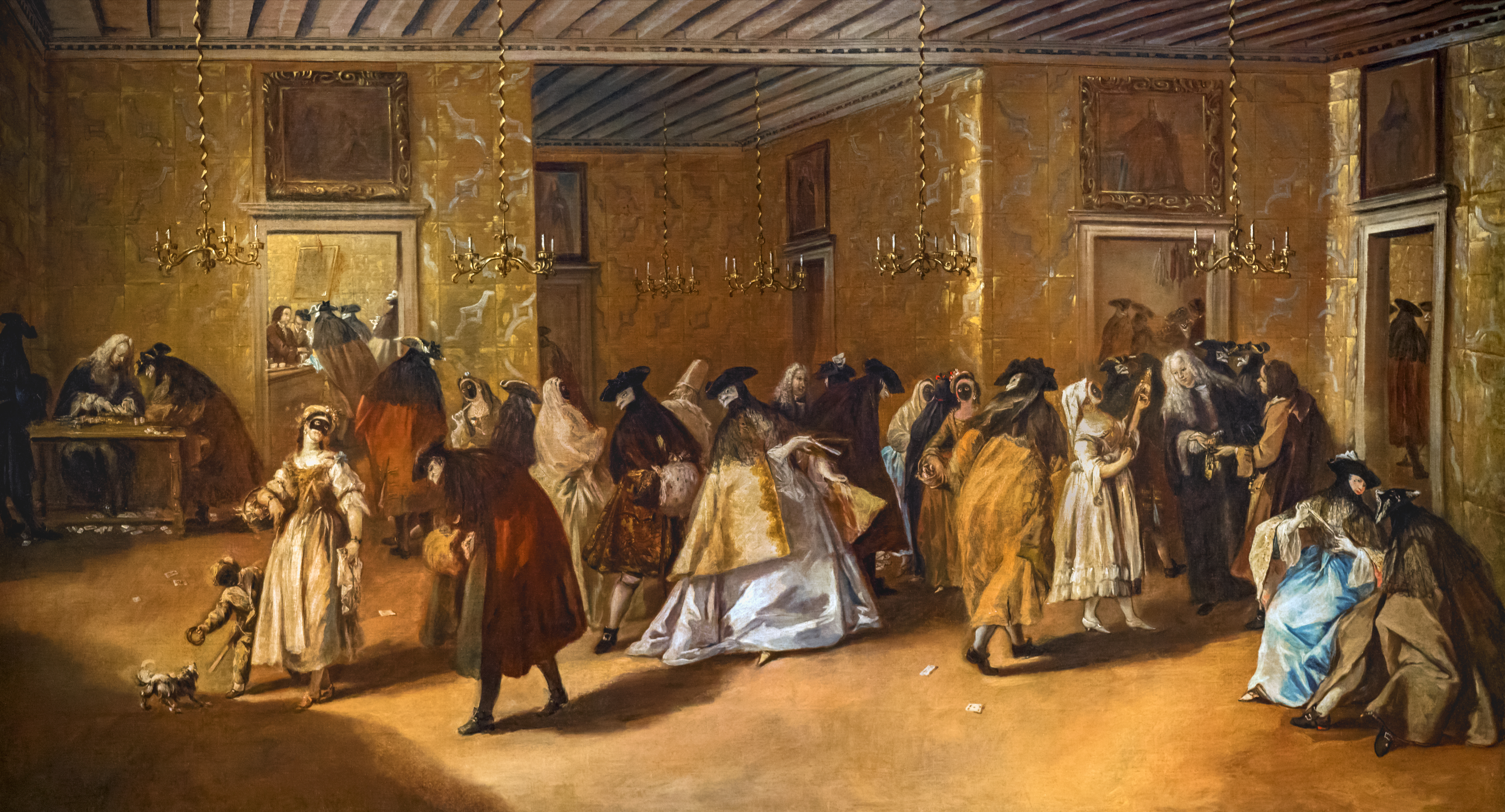
The Foyer of Dandolo's palace in San Moisè by Francesco Guardi

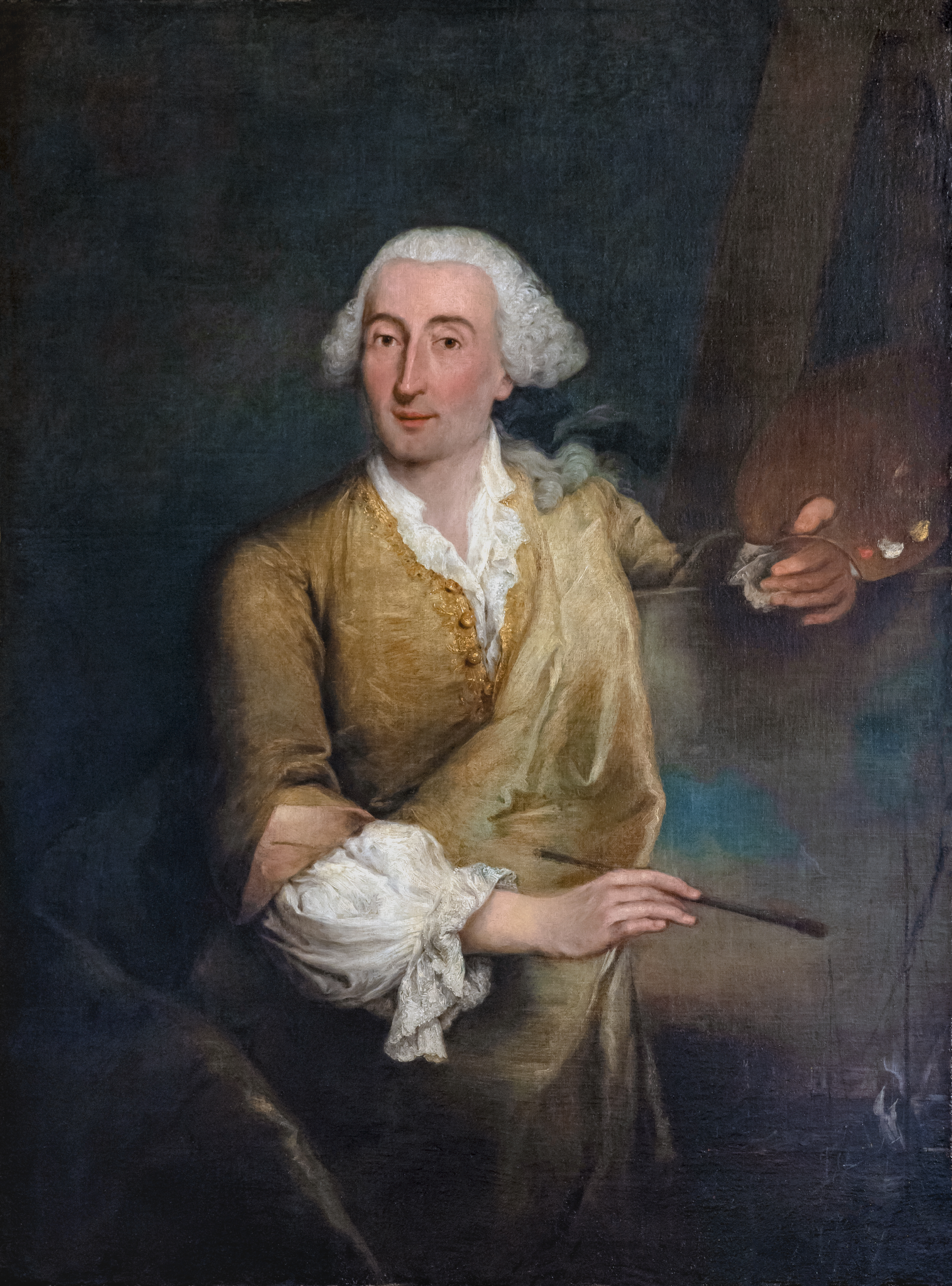
Portrait of Francesco Guardi by Pietro Longhi

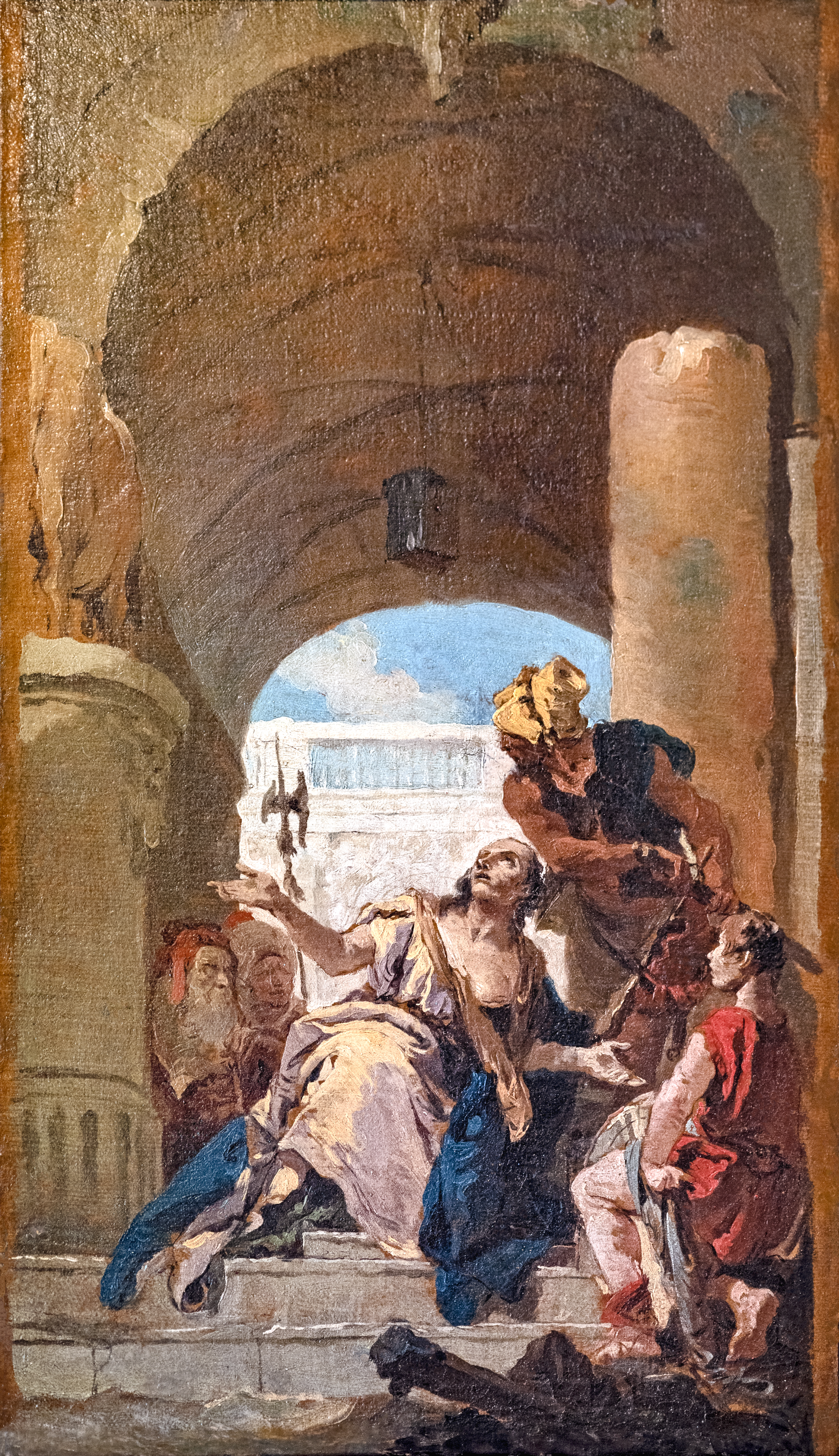
Martyrdom of Saint Theodora of Rome by Giambattista Tiepolo

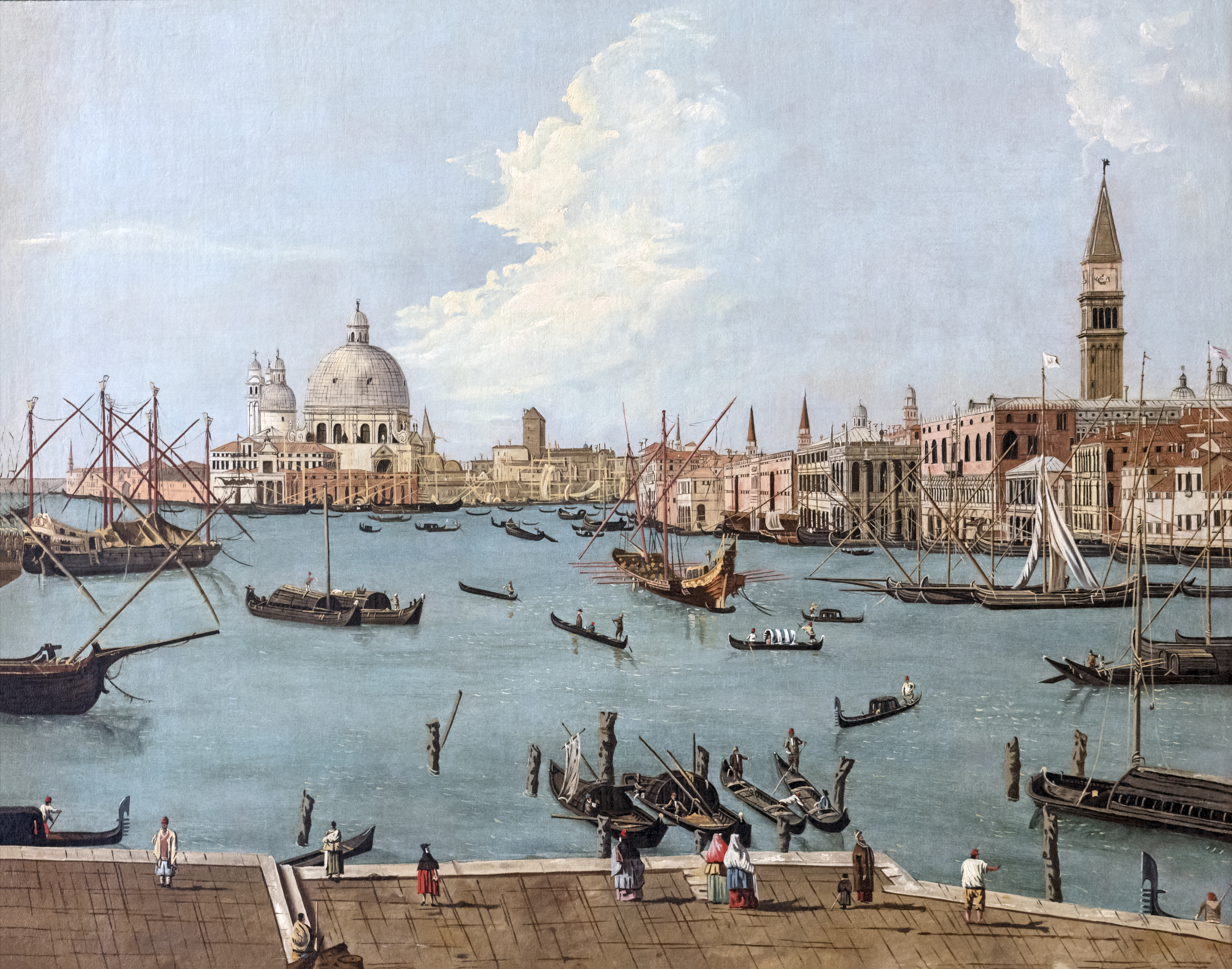
View of St. Mark's Basin

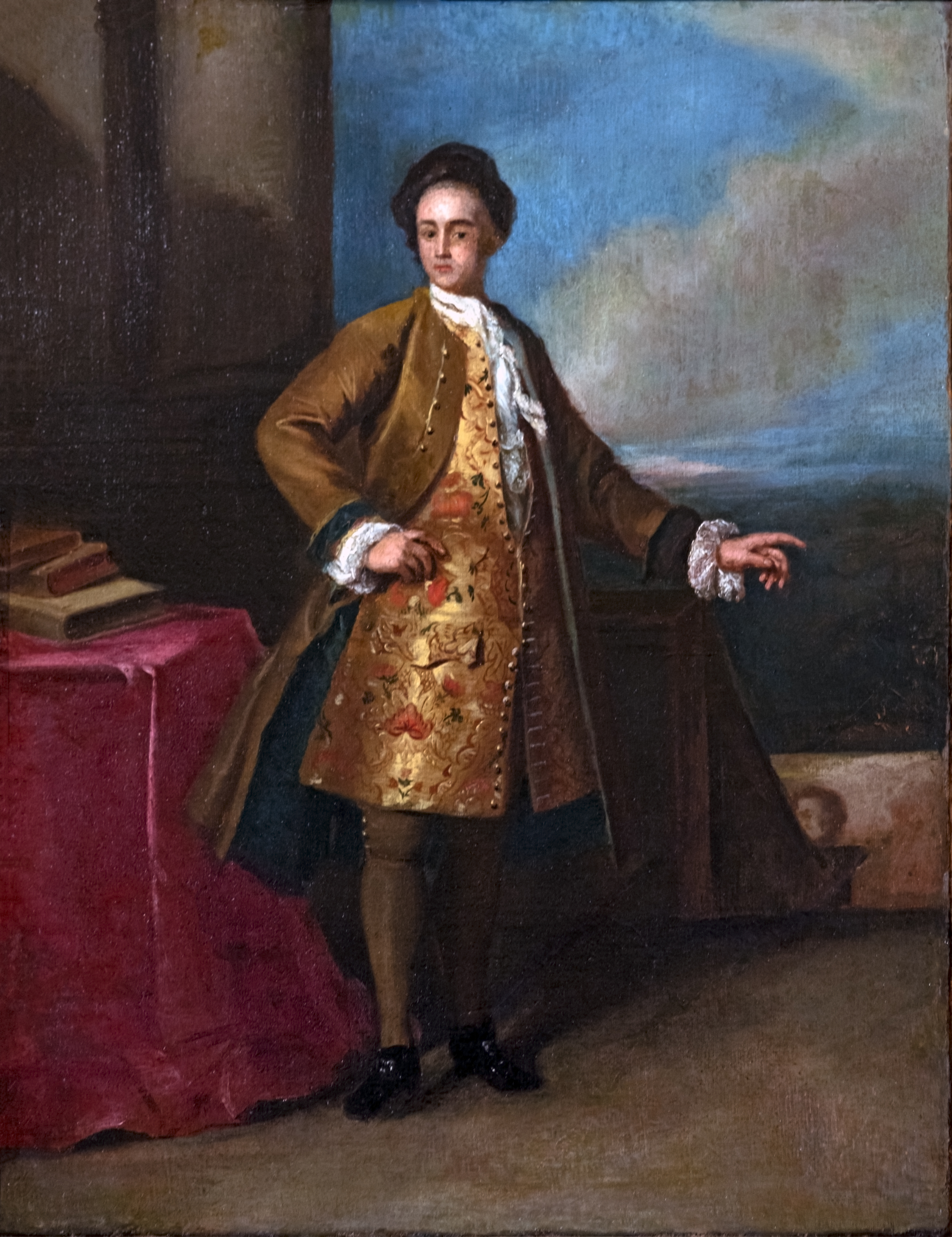
Samuel Egerton by Bartolomeo Nazari

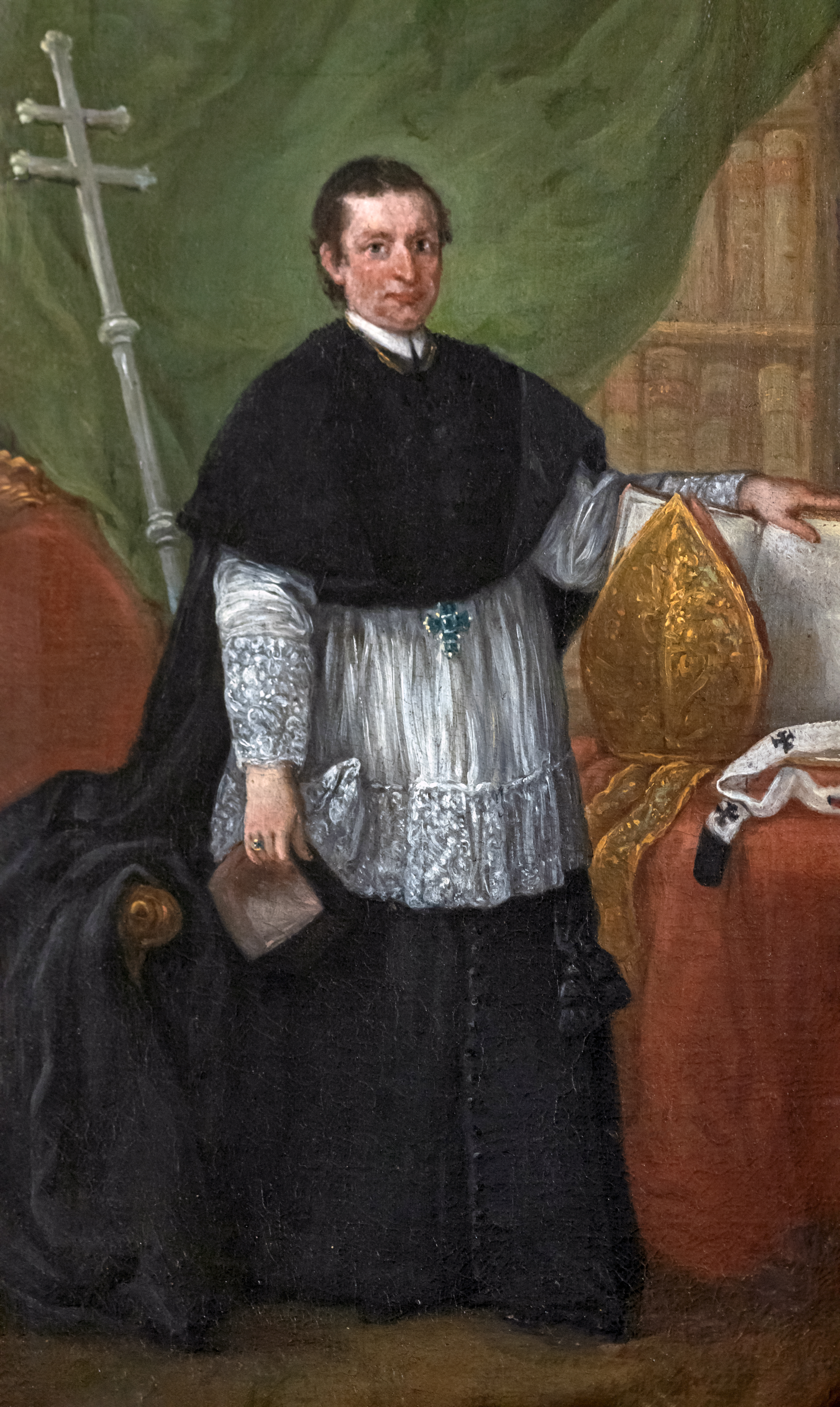
Benedetto Ganassoni by Pietro Longhi

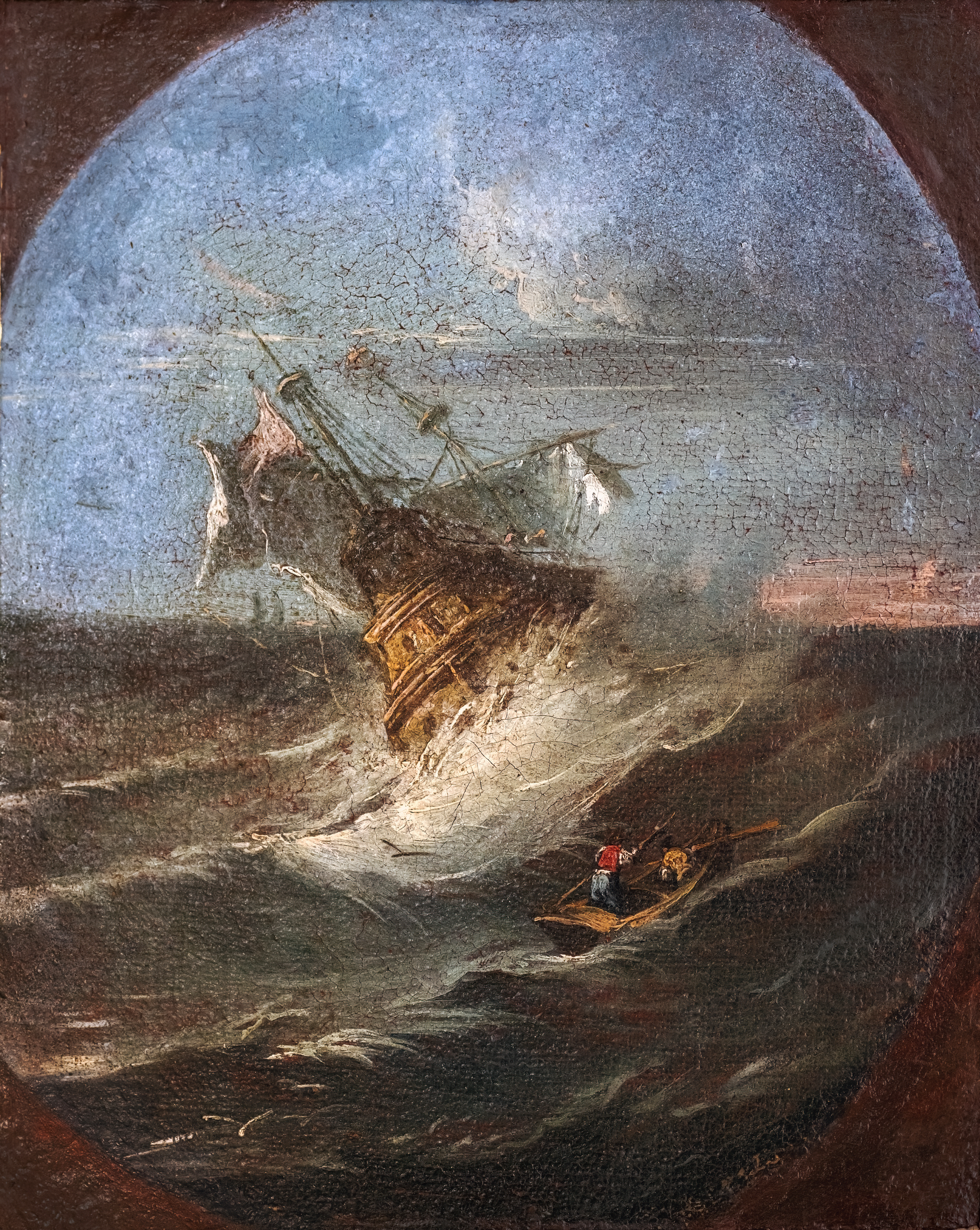
squall by Giuseppe Zais

Other Venetian artists whose works can be seen on this floor include Cima da Conegliano, Alvise Vivarini, Bonifacio de' Pitati; Tintoretto, Schiavone, the Bassano family, Paolo Fiammingo, Lambert Sustris; Padovanino and Carpinoni, Pietro Vecchia, Giovanni Segala, Palma il Giovane, Bernardo Strozzi, Francesco Maffei, Giovan Battista Langetti, Pietro Liberi; Balestra, Niccolò Bambini, Piazzetta, Nicola Grassi, Pietro Longhi, Rosalba Carriera, Sebastiano and Marco Ricci, Pellegrini, Amigoni, Antonio Marini, Zuccarelli, Zais, Giuseppe Bernardino Bison, Natale Schiavoni, Ippolito Caffi, Mancini, and Emma Ciardi.

=== Frescos from Villa Zianigo ===
A section on the second floor contains rooms with of frescos by Giandomenico Tiepolo, son of Giambattista Tiepolo, which were originally in the Villa Zianigo, near Mirano.

The hallway

In the corridor leading to the hall, on the left wall, a scene of the liberated Jerusalem of the Cup: "Renaud who abandons the Garden of Armida" by Giandomenico Tiepolo, who was on the ground floor of the villa from Zianigo. On the right wall of the vestibule two canvases of Nicolò Bambini: Achilles and the girls of Licomede and The Sabines' kidnapping; overcoming these two canvases The Apotheosis of Venice by Francesco Fontebasso; on the right, an "Allegory of Summer"; on the back wall: Falcon chasing a flock of sparrows on the run by Giandomenico Tiepolo.

Achille e le figlie di Licomede by Nicolò Bambini

Ratto delle Sabine by Nicolò Bambini

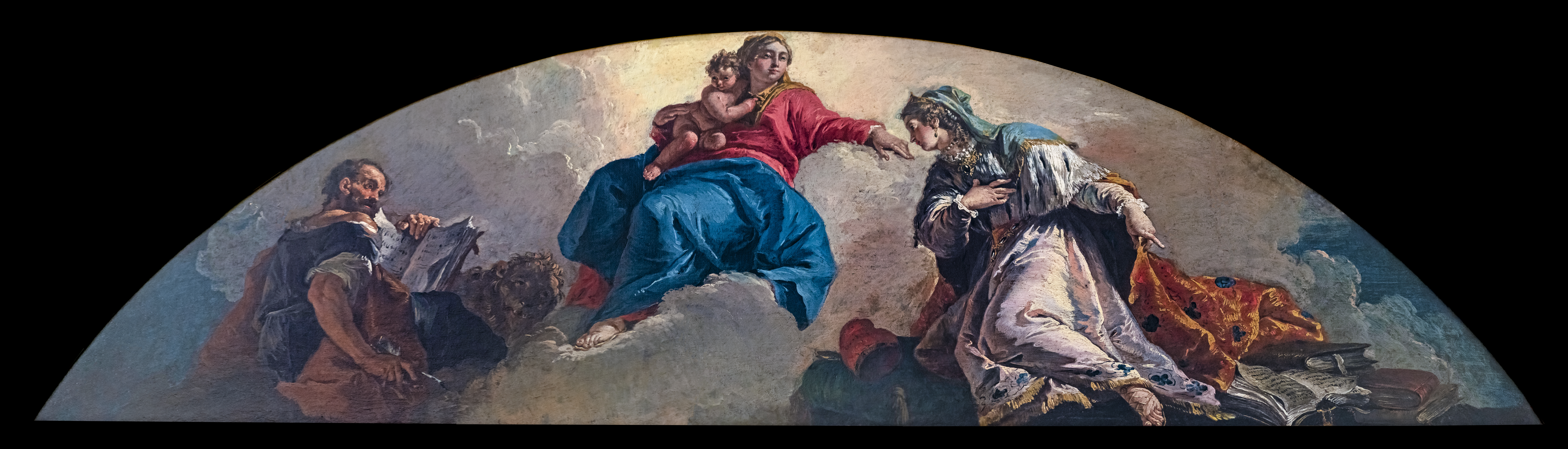
Apoteosi di Venezia by Francesco Fontebasso

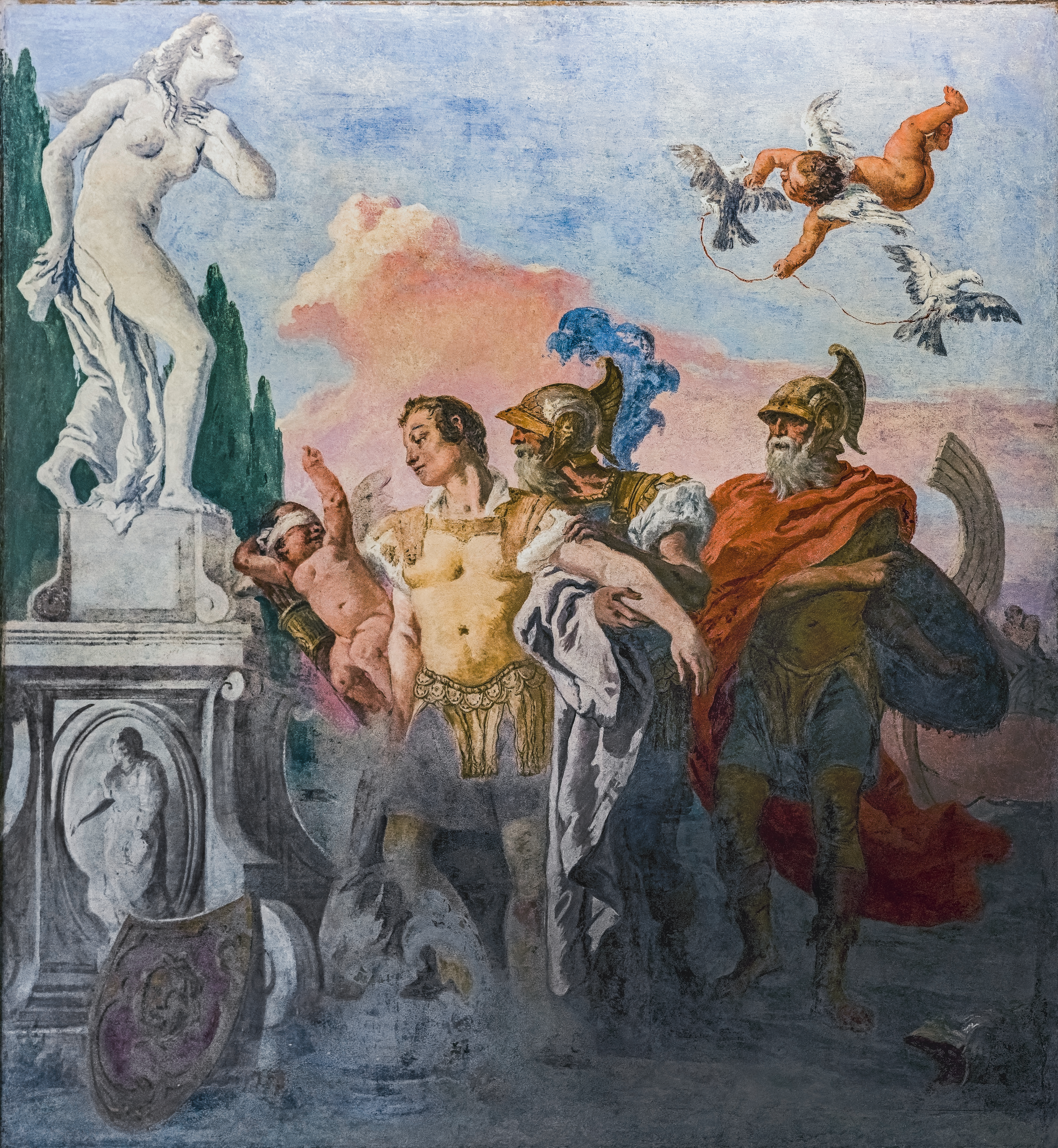
Rinaldo lasciando il giardino d'Armida

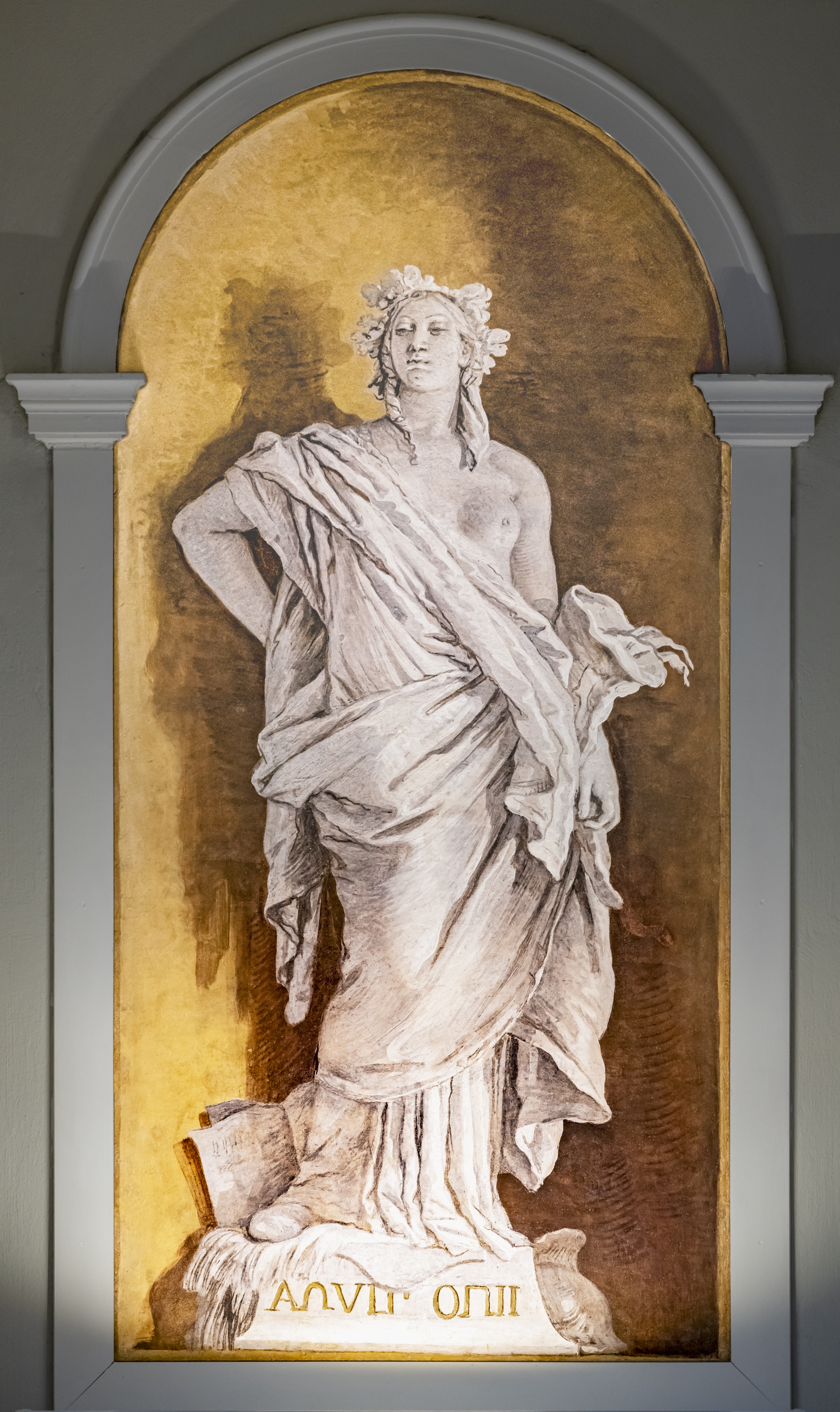
Camerino del falchetto

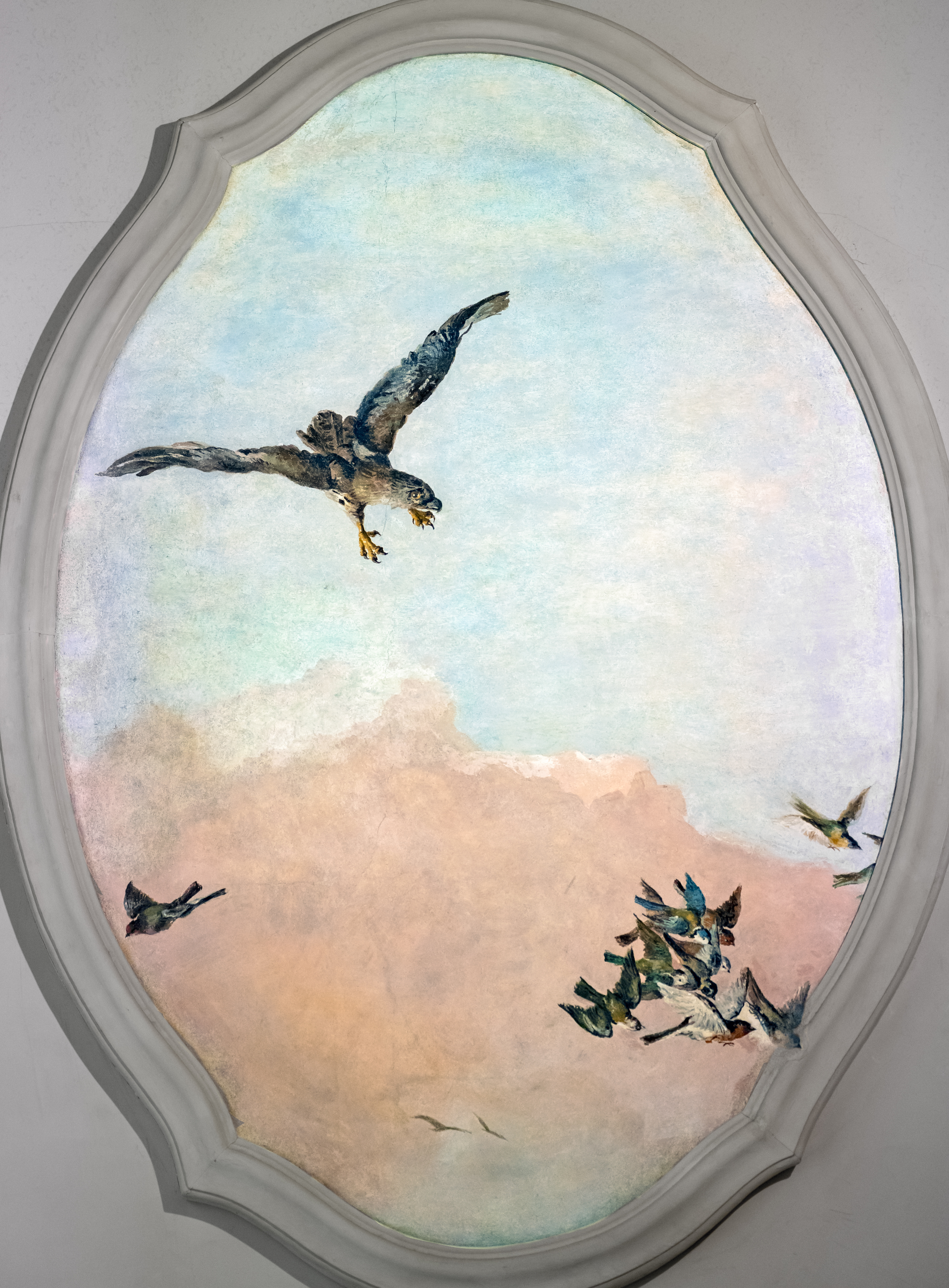
Falchetto che piomba sullo stormo di passeri in fuga

Pulcinella was a standard character in Italian Commedia dell'arte since the 17th century, a figure for ridicule and satire; he wore a tall white hat and gown, a mask, and carried a club or long forks. The frescos were begun in about 1759, and illustrate the stories of Pulcinella in various comic or satiric scenes. They were originally made by the elder Tiepolo for his own country house. They were finished in about 1797. Another important Tiepolo work is displayed in tho section; the New World; a long fresco in the corridor which was originally on the ground floor of the Villa Zianigo, depicting a line of Venetians, including one in a Pulcinella costume with a long a fork, waiting to look into a magic lantern presentation, Promenade is said to show Tiepolo himself, to the right, looking at the scene ironically through his eyeglass. On the opposite wall are two more scenes, Promenade and Minuet, showing, also in a certain ironic vein, Venetian aristocrats dancing and promenading.

The Pulcinella Room, in this section, contains a group of three frescoes by Giandomenico Tiepolo from the Villa, called Pulcinella in Love, Pulcinella and the Saltimboques, and the Departure of Pulcinella. The round fresco on the ceiling depicts Pulcinella seen from below walking across a tightrope. These paintings were made between 1793 and 1797 at the Villa Zianigo, at the time of the first occupation of Venice by the French, and the beginning of downfall of the Venetian Republic, and its particular style of life and art.

The Pulicinella section contains two more rooms, the Cabinet of the Centaurs and the Cabinet of Satyrs, with monochromatic scenes by Giandomenico Tiepolo of themes and creatures. The ceiling of the Cabinet of Centaurs has a red monochrome meed image called Rhapsody, which is said to be a tribute to the poet Homer, along with medallions and images of mythological scenes and creatures. On the ceiling is a large rectangular painting of Scenes from Roman History, and, over the doors, more images of both male and female satyrs.

The Chapel is a room which displays paintings by Giandomenico Tiepolo for the chapel of the Villa Zianigo, which was consecrated in 1758. The paintings are signed by Tiepolo with the date 1759. The main figure in the paintings is Saint Jerome Émilien, depicted with handcuffs to represent his imprisonment in 1511 by soldiers of the Holy Roman Empire, and his liberation, according to the legend, through the intervention of the Virgin Mary.

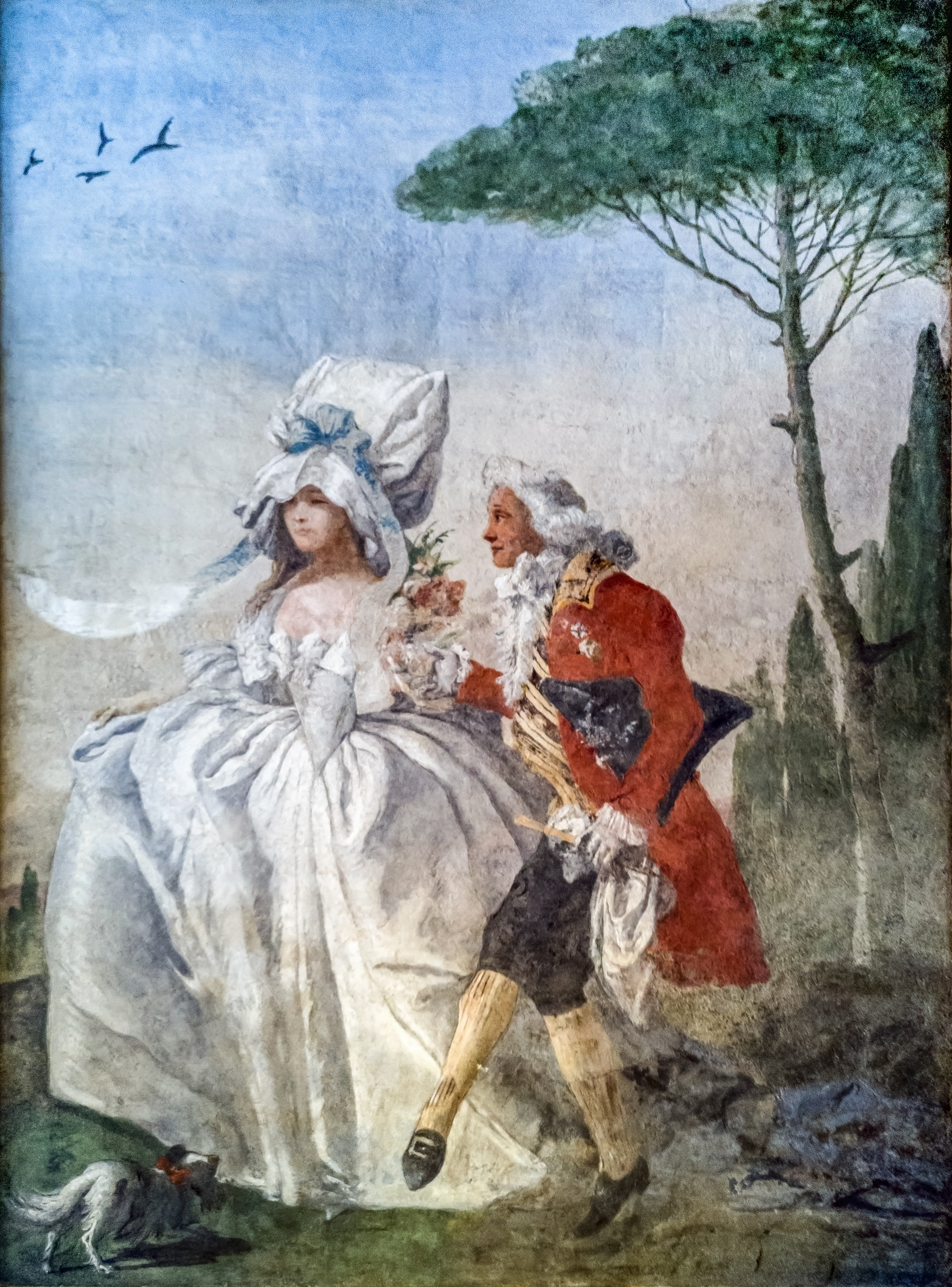
Minuetto in villa di Zianigo

Ceiling of Mondo Novo Hall

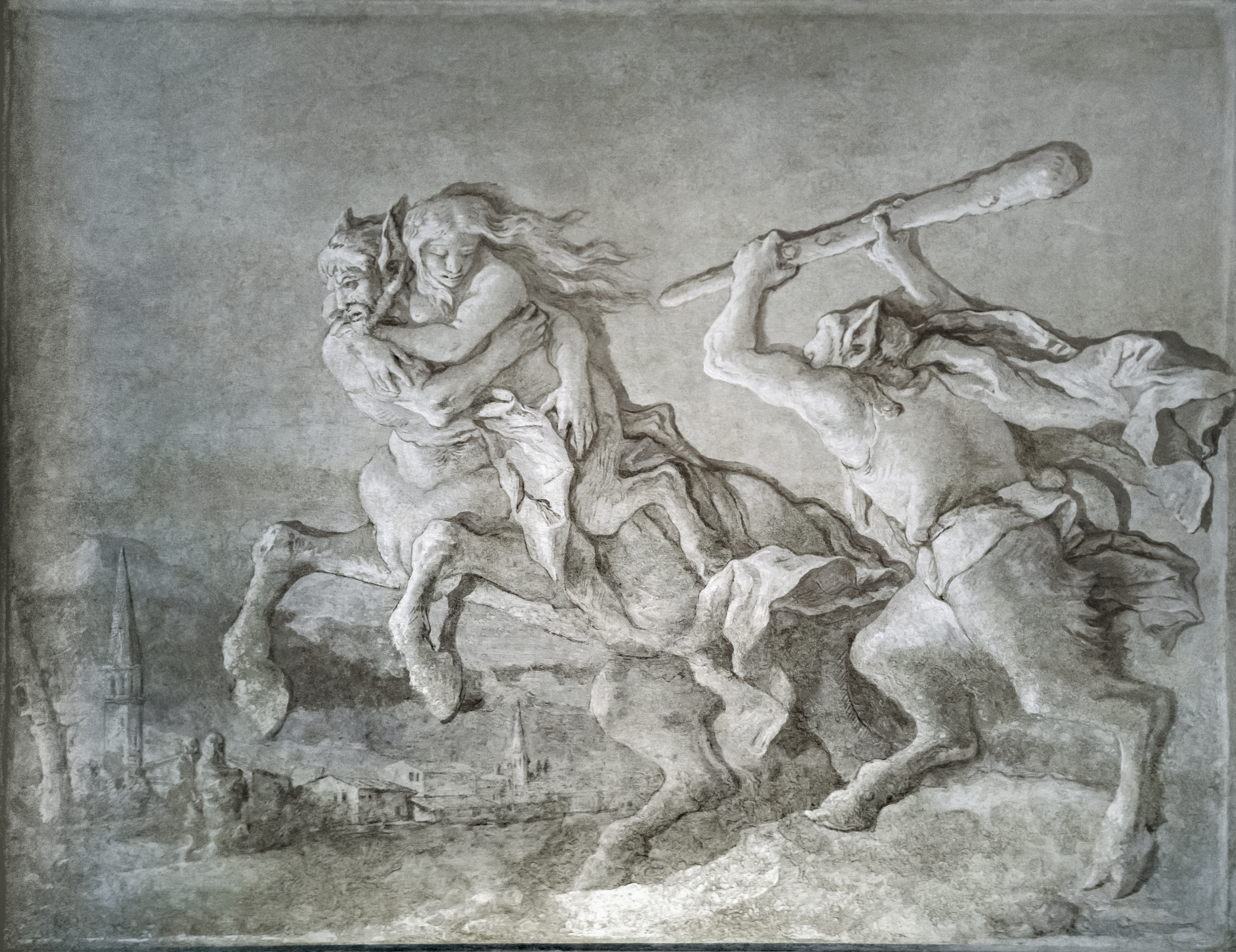
Centauro che rimuove una satira

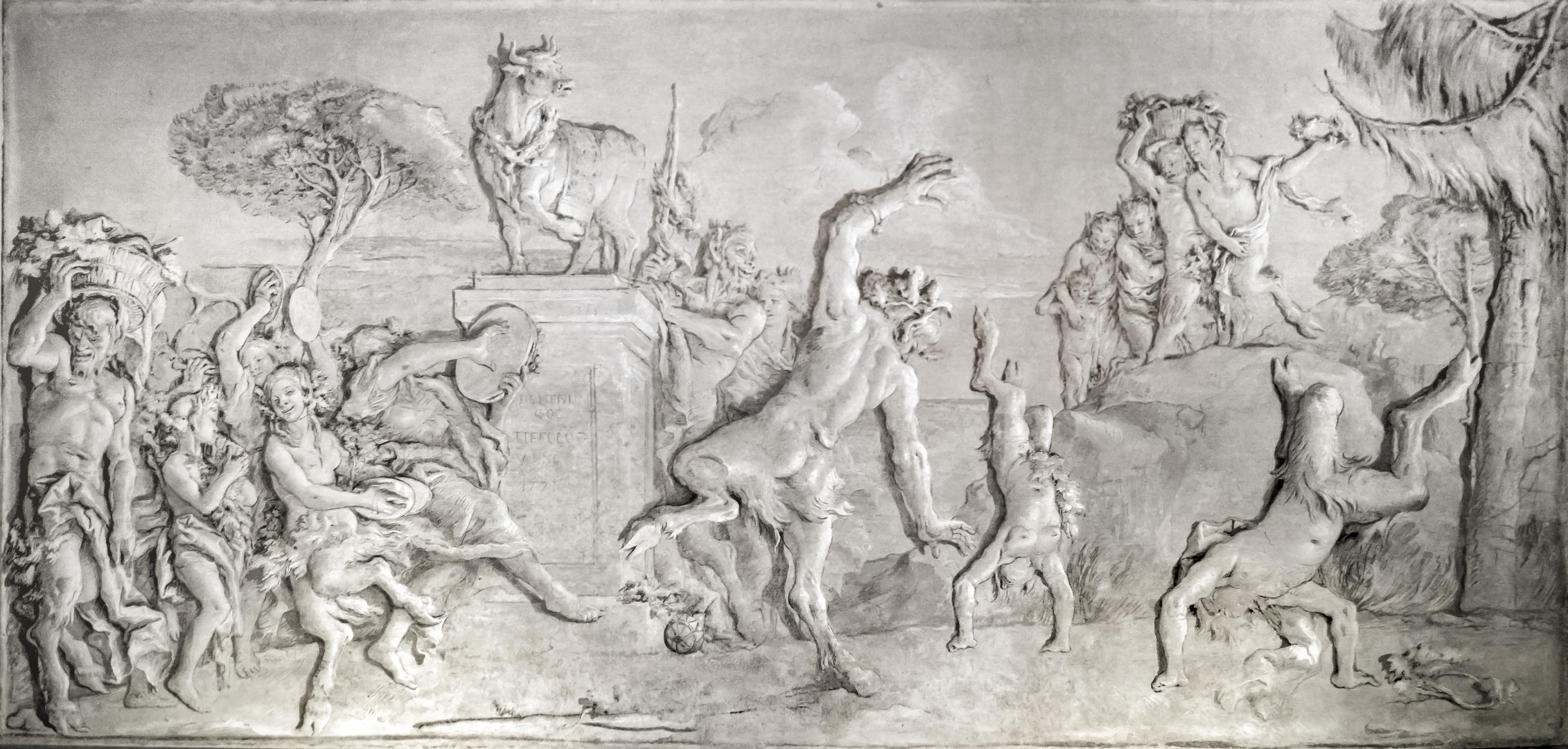
La danza dei satiri

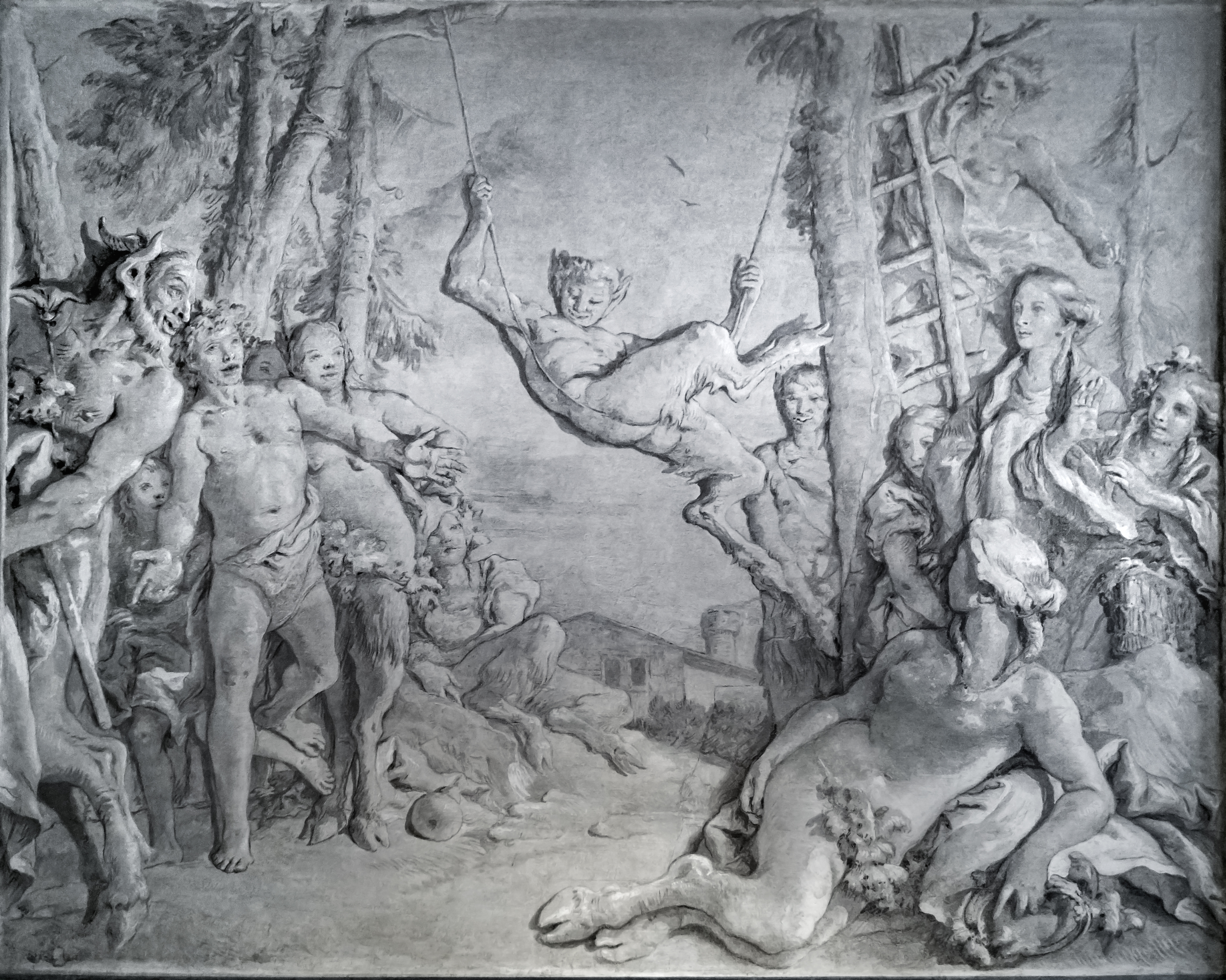
L’altalena del satiro

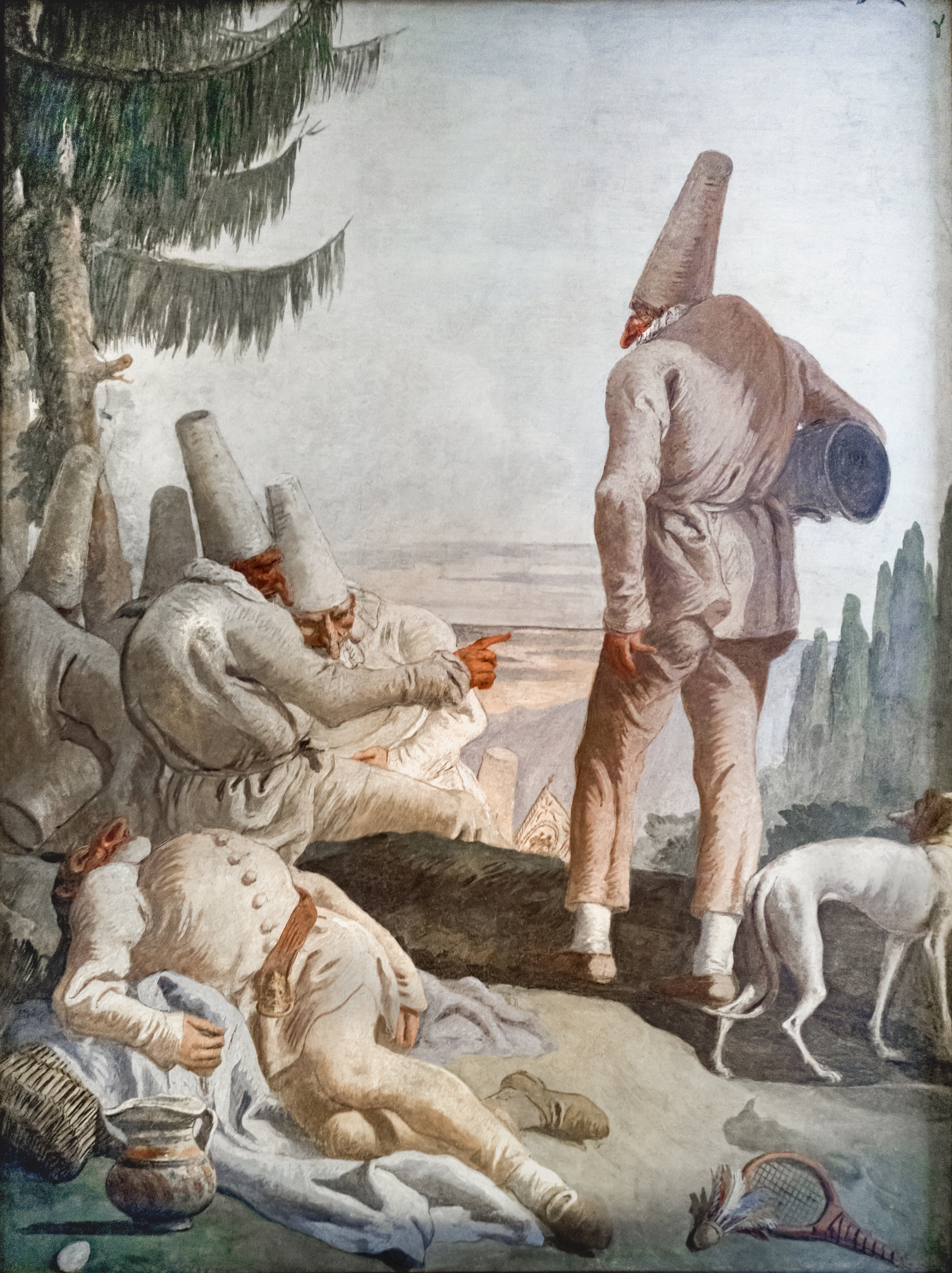
Pulcinelli a riposo

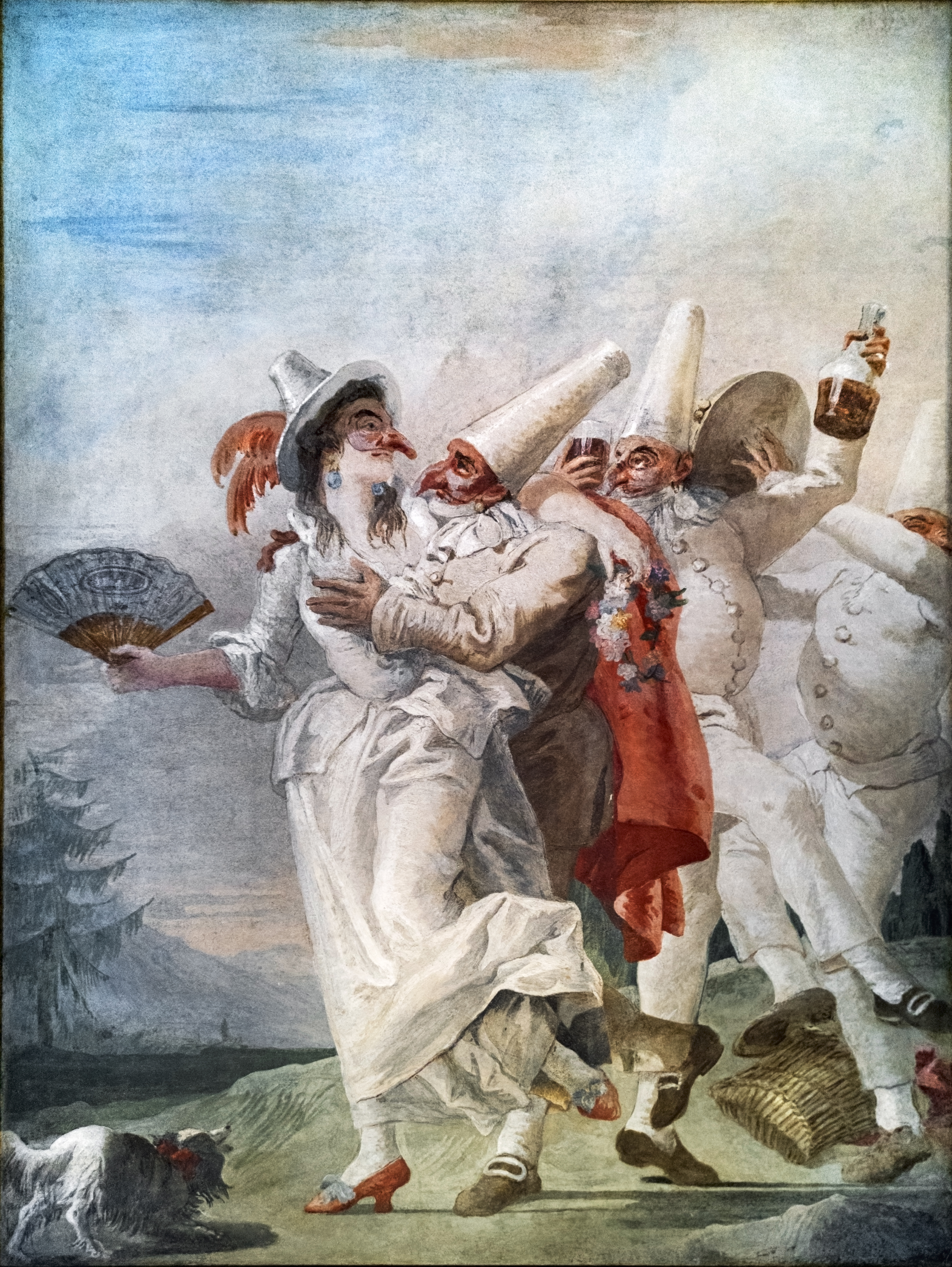
Pulcinella innamorato

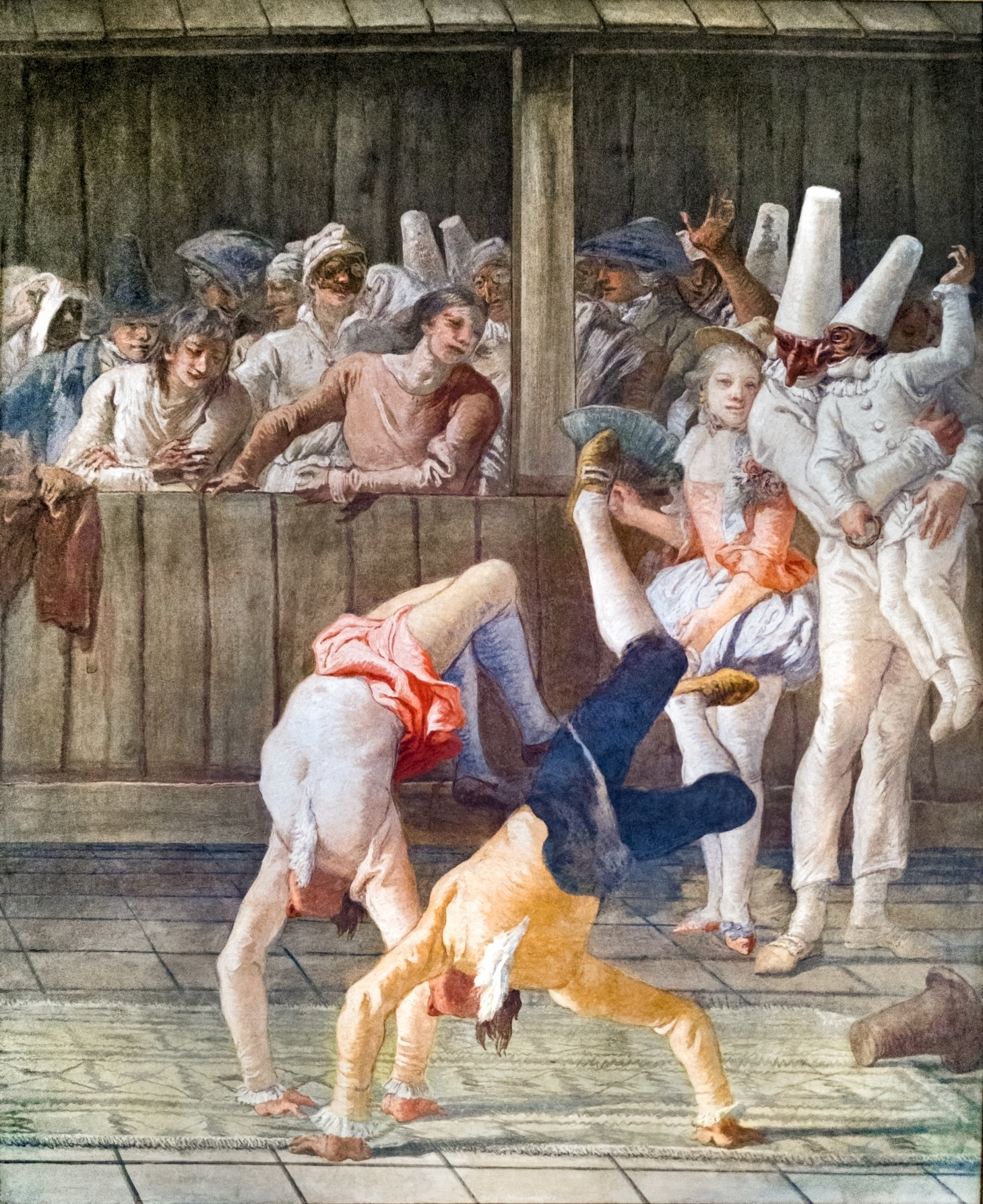
Il casotto dei saltimbanchi

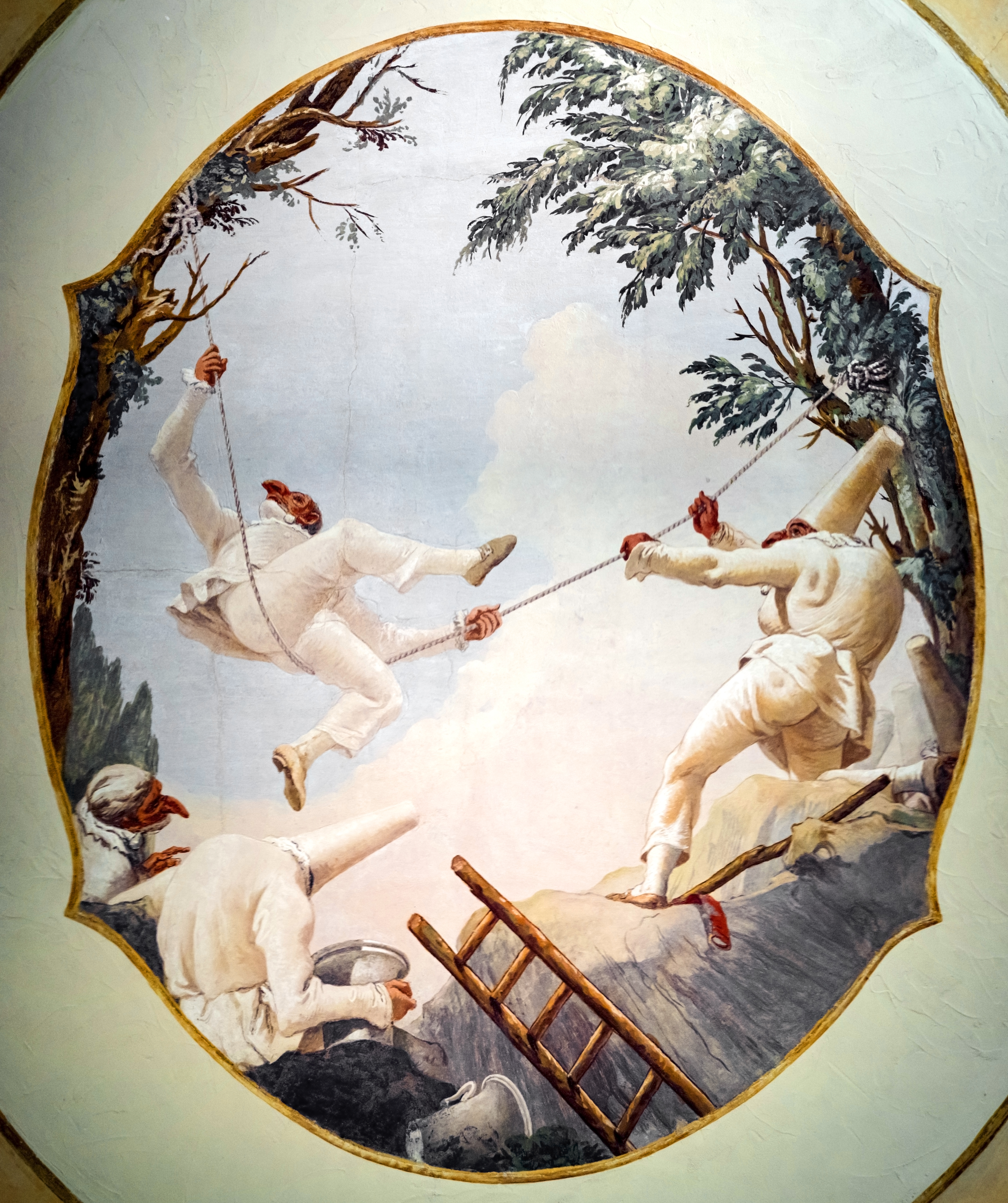
Altalena dei pulcinelli - Ceiling

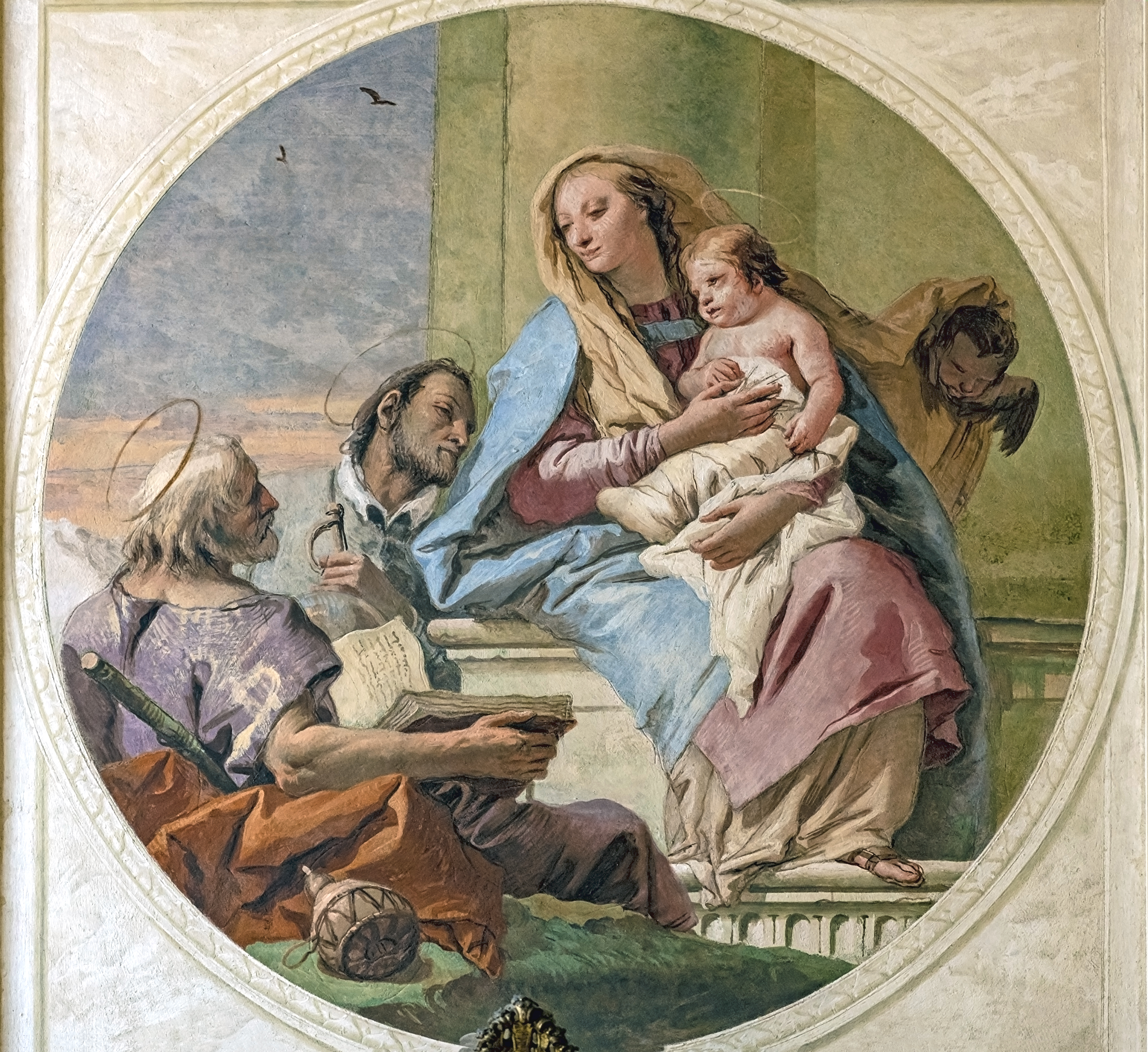
Madonna col Bambino adorata da San Girolamo Miani e da San Giacomo apostolo

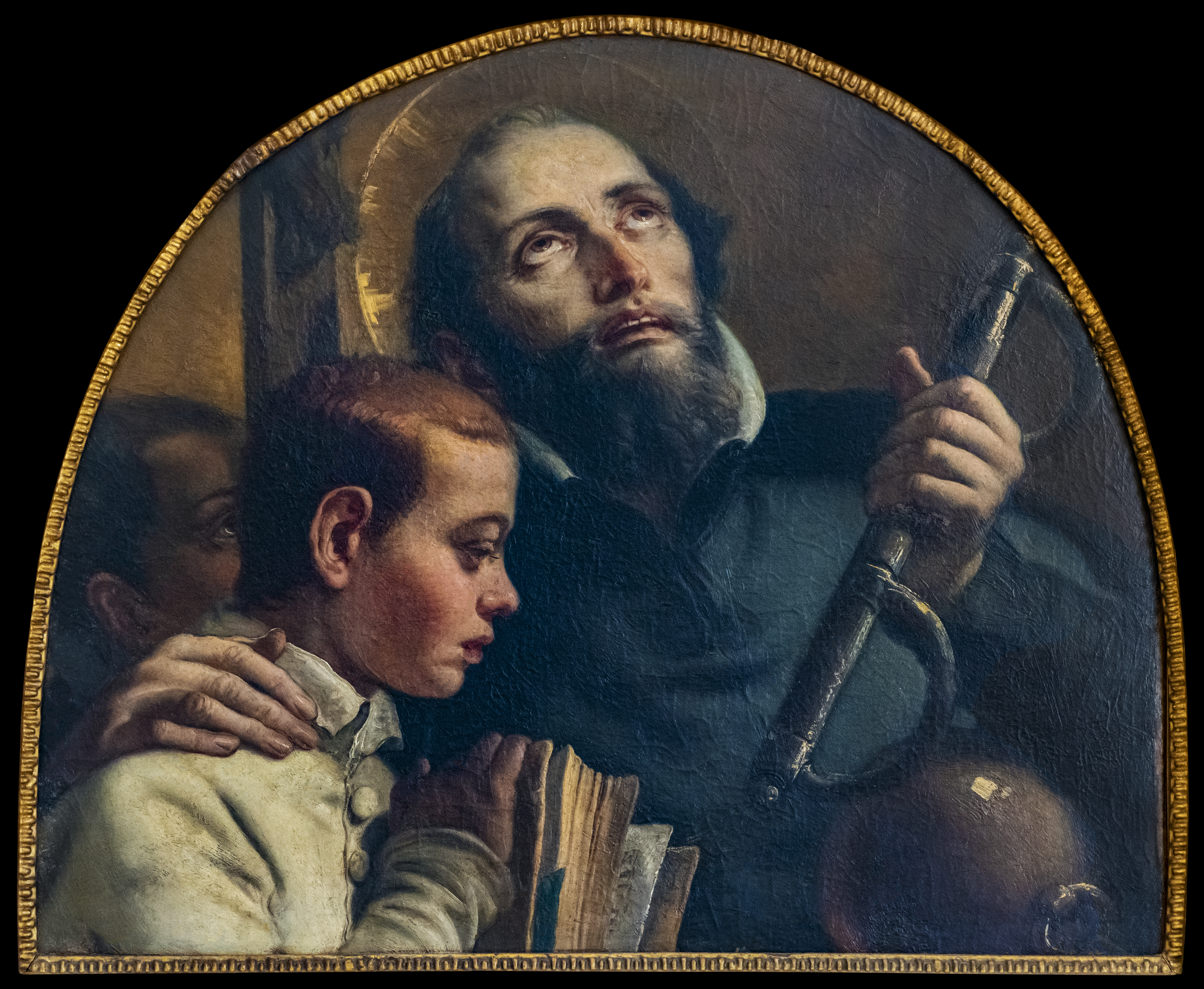
Hiëronymus Emiliani

=== Antonio Guardi Room ===
Commissioned by Maria Barbarigo Savorgnan from the painter Antonio Guardi, the frescoes of this room were covered with plaster during the nineteenth century and found during a restoration of the Palace Barbarigo Dabalà in 1936. Detached and mounted they were transferred to Ca' Rezzonico. They are three in number: Minerva; Venus and Love before Vulcan's forge; and Apollo. The frescoes were framed with plasterwork. These restored frescoes are the only examples of this type of work by Guardi. The Veiled Lady, represents the allegory of Purity, is the work of the Venetian sculptor Antonio Corradini, who was known for his depiction of figures under veils.

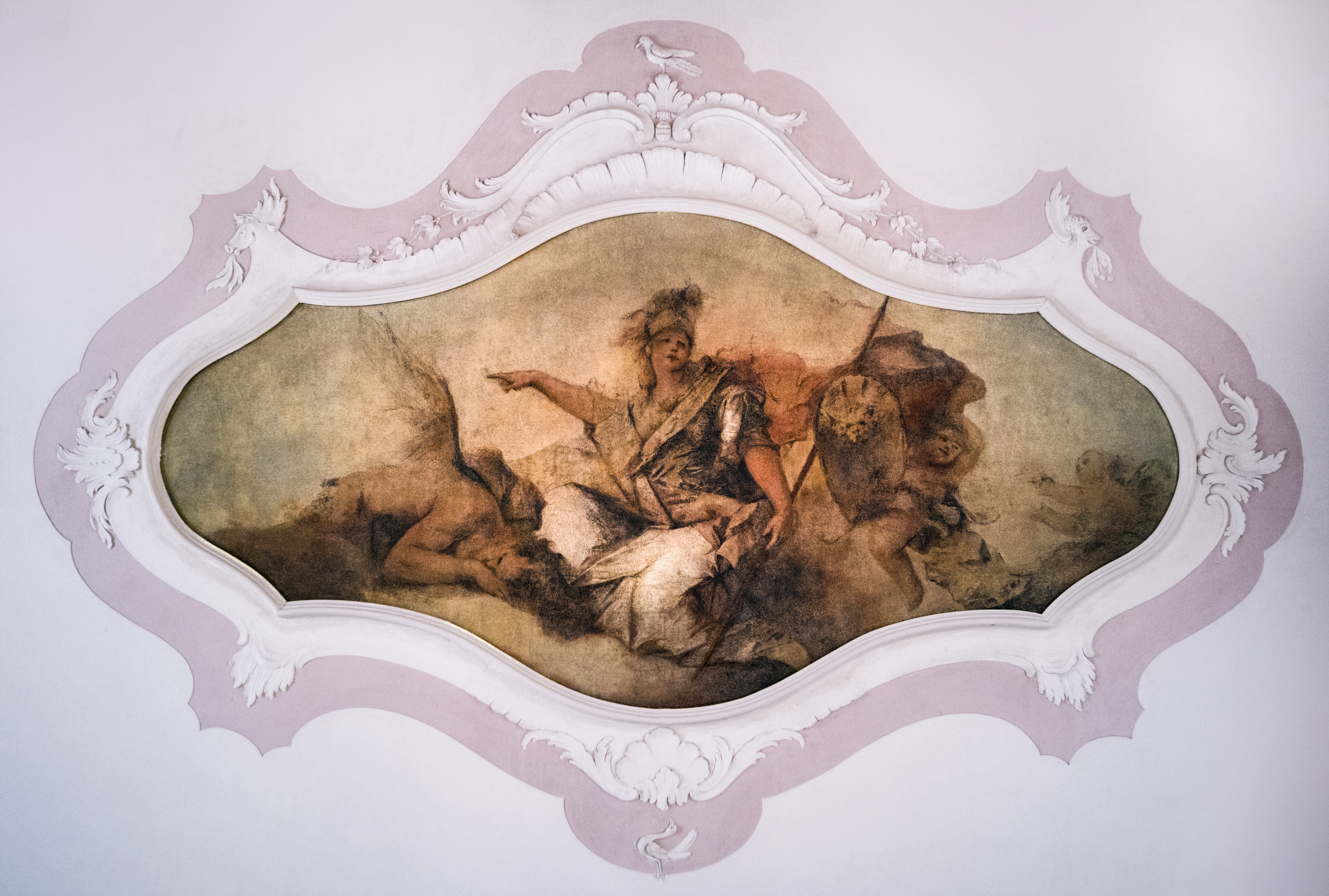
Minerva

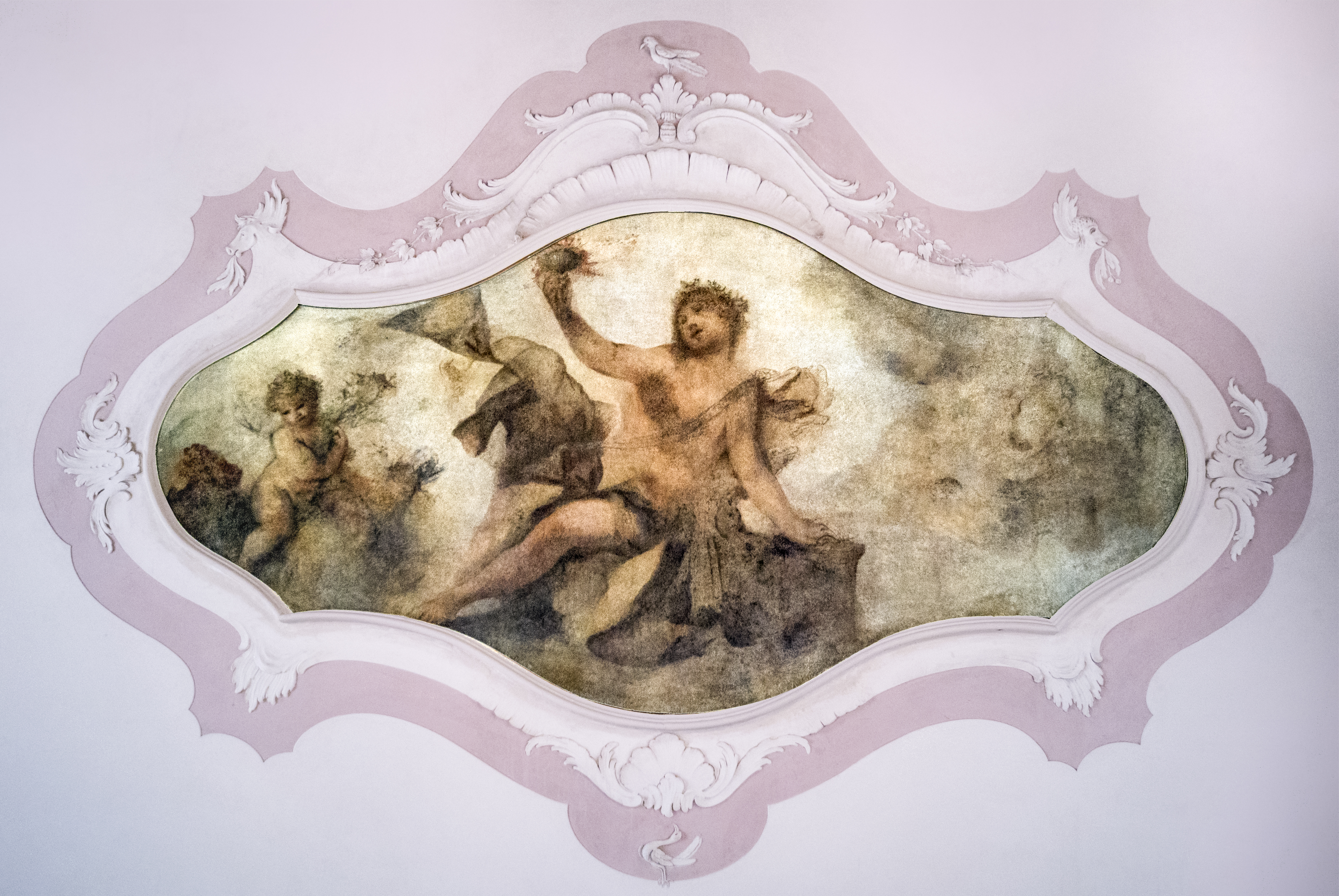
Apollo

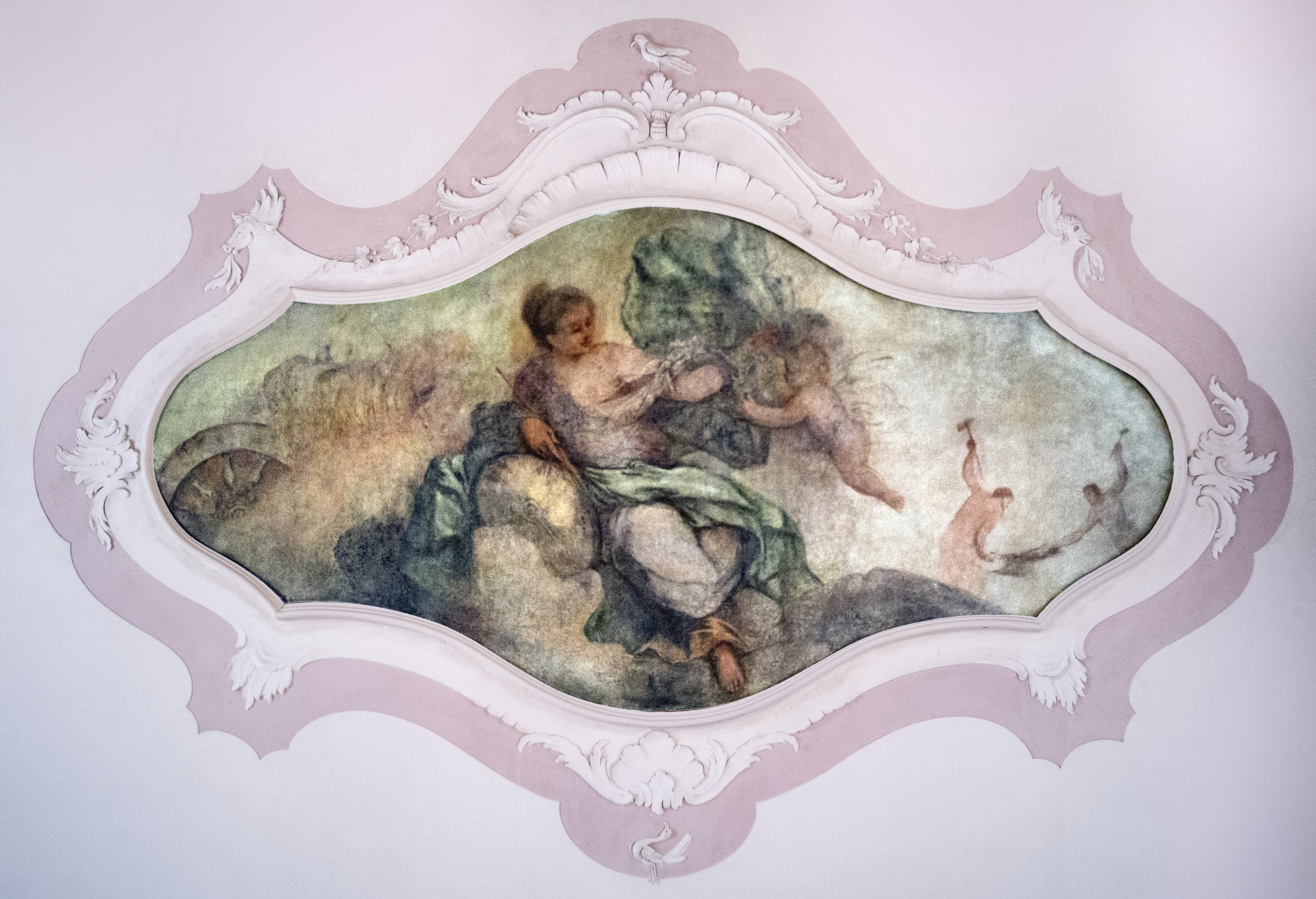
Venere e Amore di fronte alla fucina di Vulcano

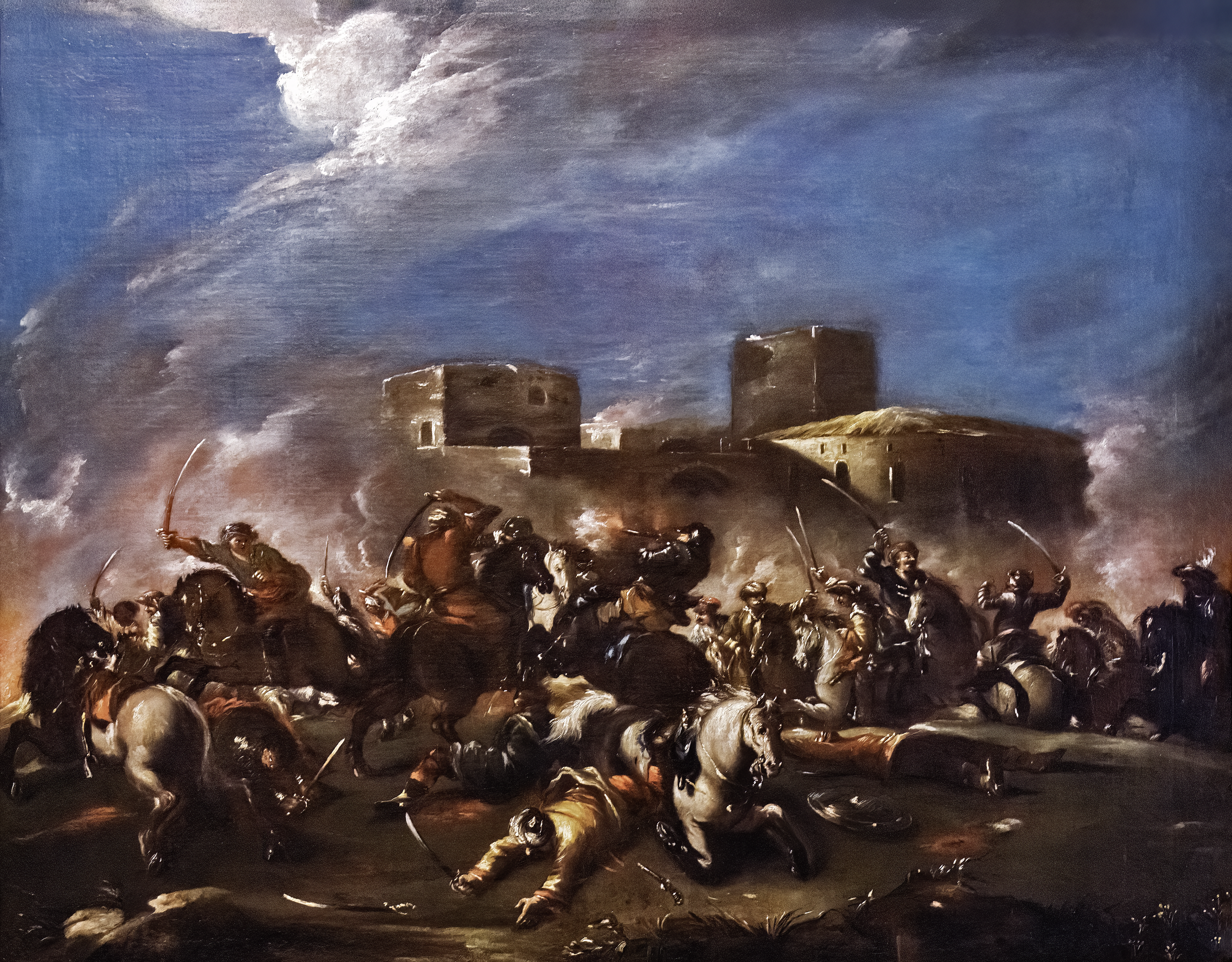
Battel Gianantonio Guardi

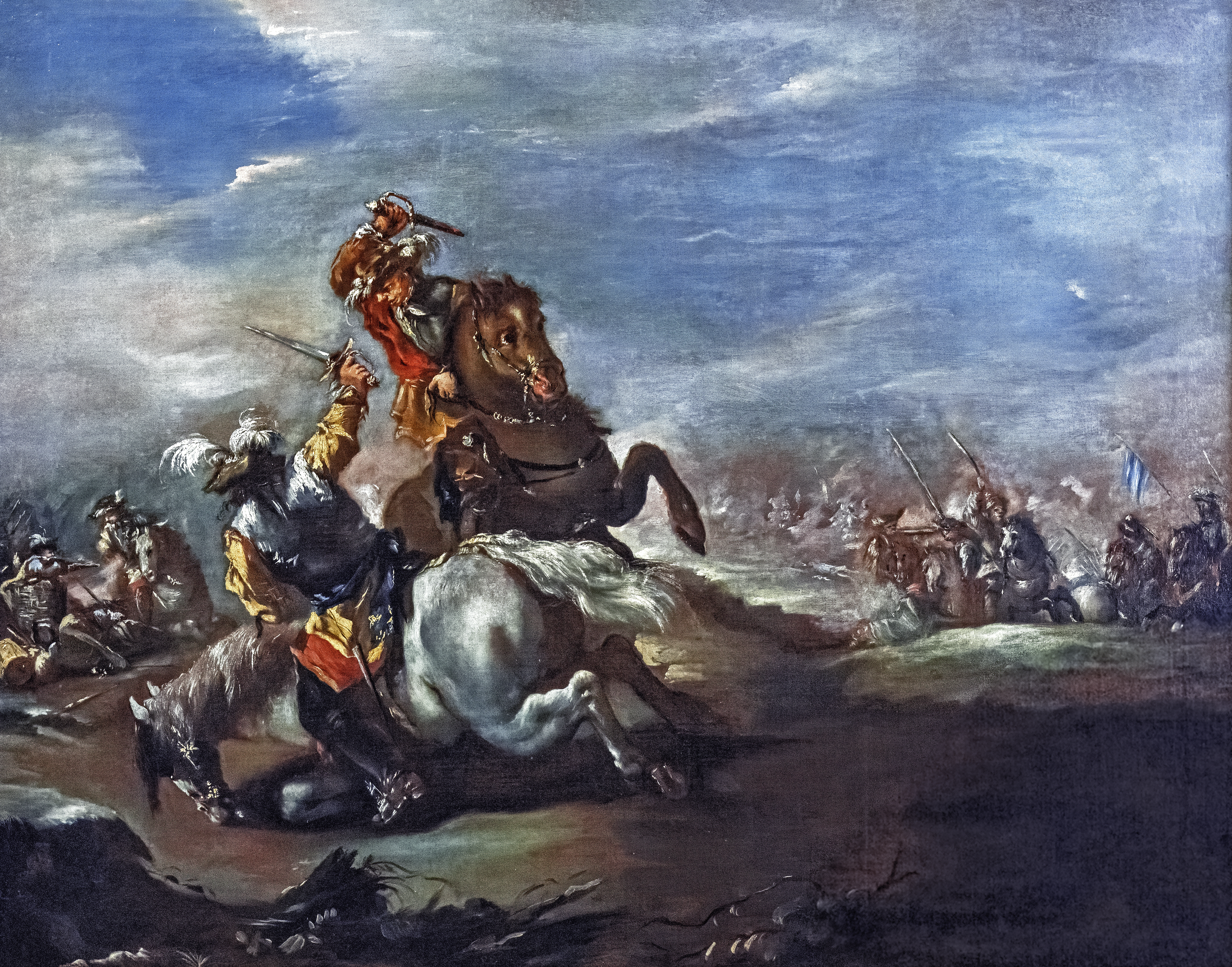
Duel between knights Gianantonio Guardi

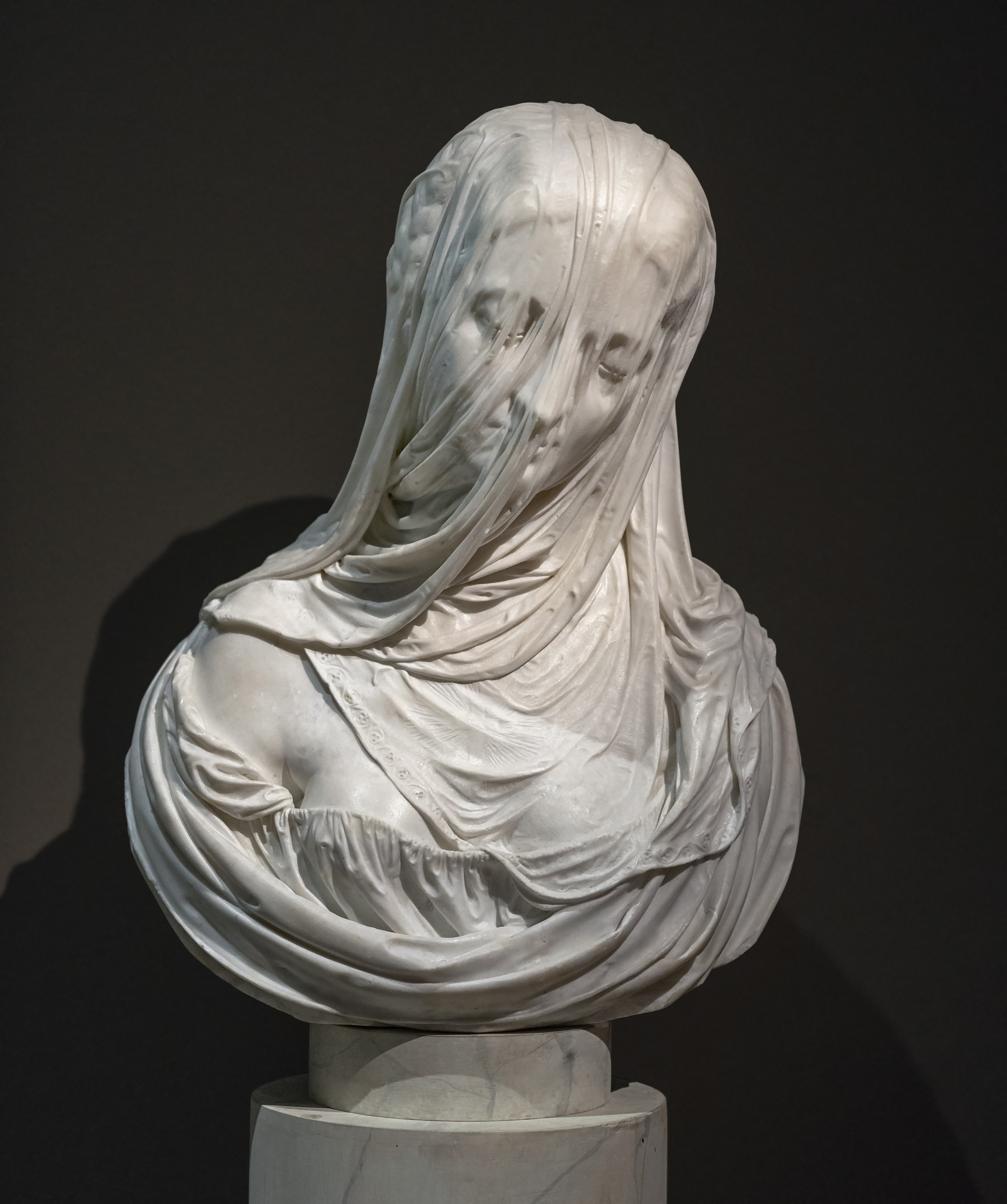
The Veiled Lady (1772) by Corradini

=== Longhi Hall ===
The paintings in this room offer the opportunity to compare two different trends in the Venetian painting school of the Eighteenth century: vivid, sensual, rococo, visible in the allegorical and mythological works of Giambattista Tiepolo, with a ceiling, "zephyr and Flore" ironic and the critical spirit of the Venetian Lights, visible in the paintings of Pietro Longhi hanging on the walls. The canvas of Tiepolo, painted in the 1730s for Ca' Pesaro, is part of the beginnings of his work. The joint presence of Zephyr, one of the four winds, and Flore is a reference to spring, so to fertility. The colors are bright and transparent. The artist has virtually drawn sensual flesh tones and accentuated color contrasts. Pietro Longhi's series of paintings on the walls depict scenes from everyday life; a visit to a painting studio, a hairdresser at work, scenes of family and family life, concerts, events and entertainment. Longhi appears in them as an insightful observer of forms and ways of life, submitting in detail the empty habits and pompous weaknesses of his heroes and their world. He distinguishes himself by presenting house interiors as, to a certain extent, by Canaletto with his vedute.

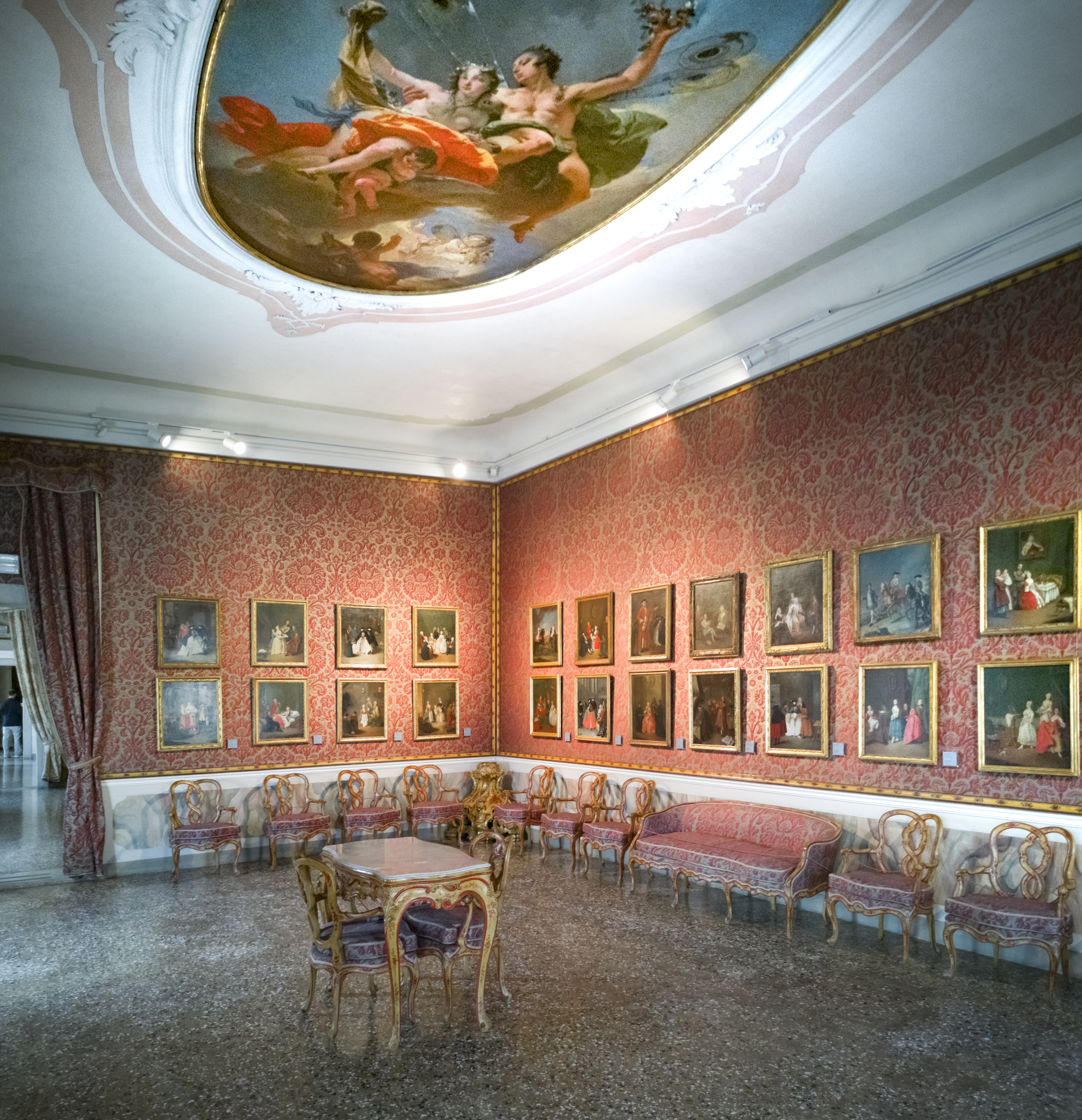
Longhi Hall

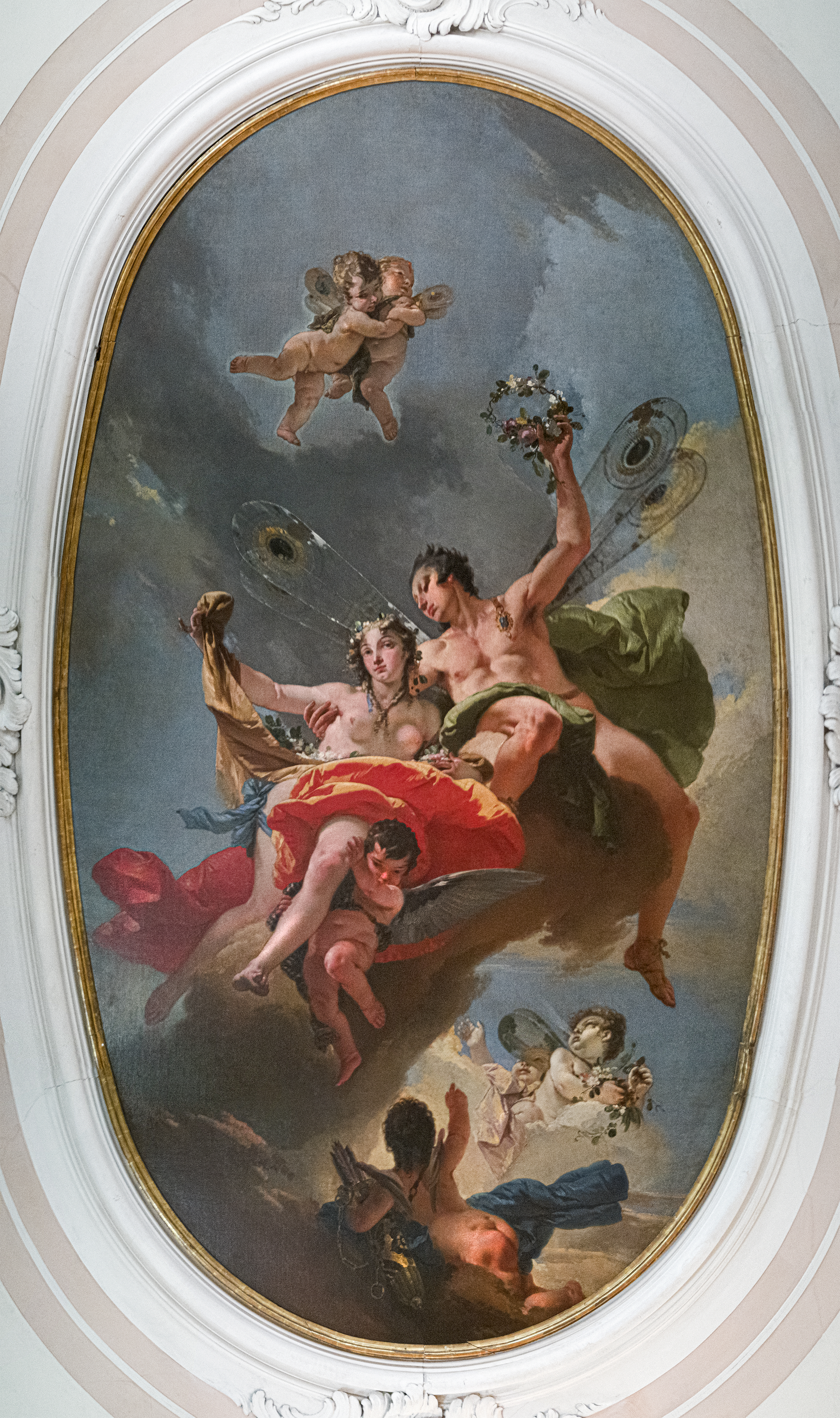
Longhi Room - Ceiling by Giambattista Tiepolo

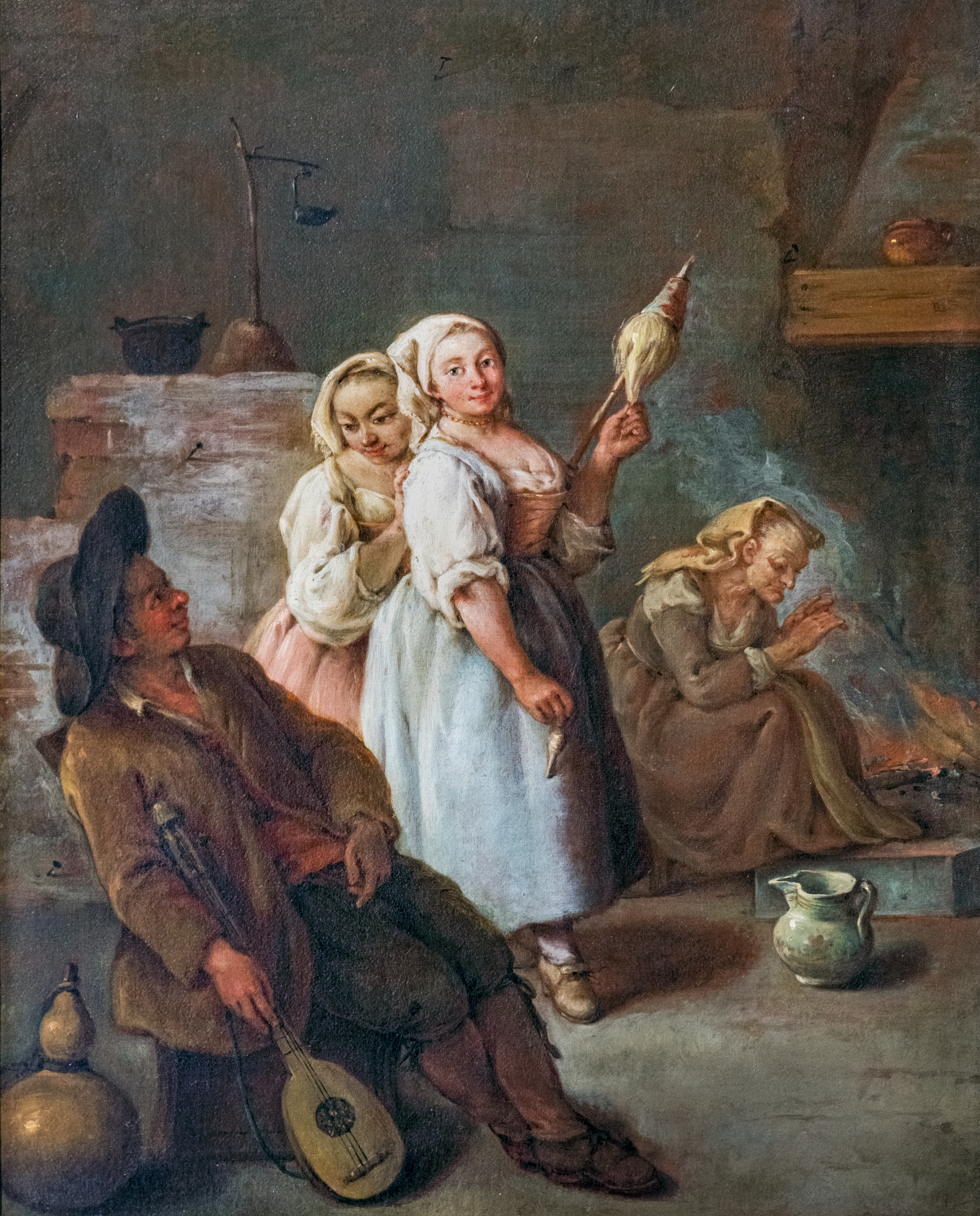
La filatrice 1740, by Pietro Longhi

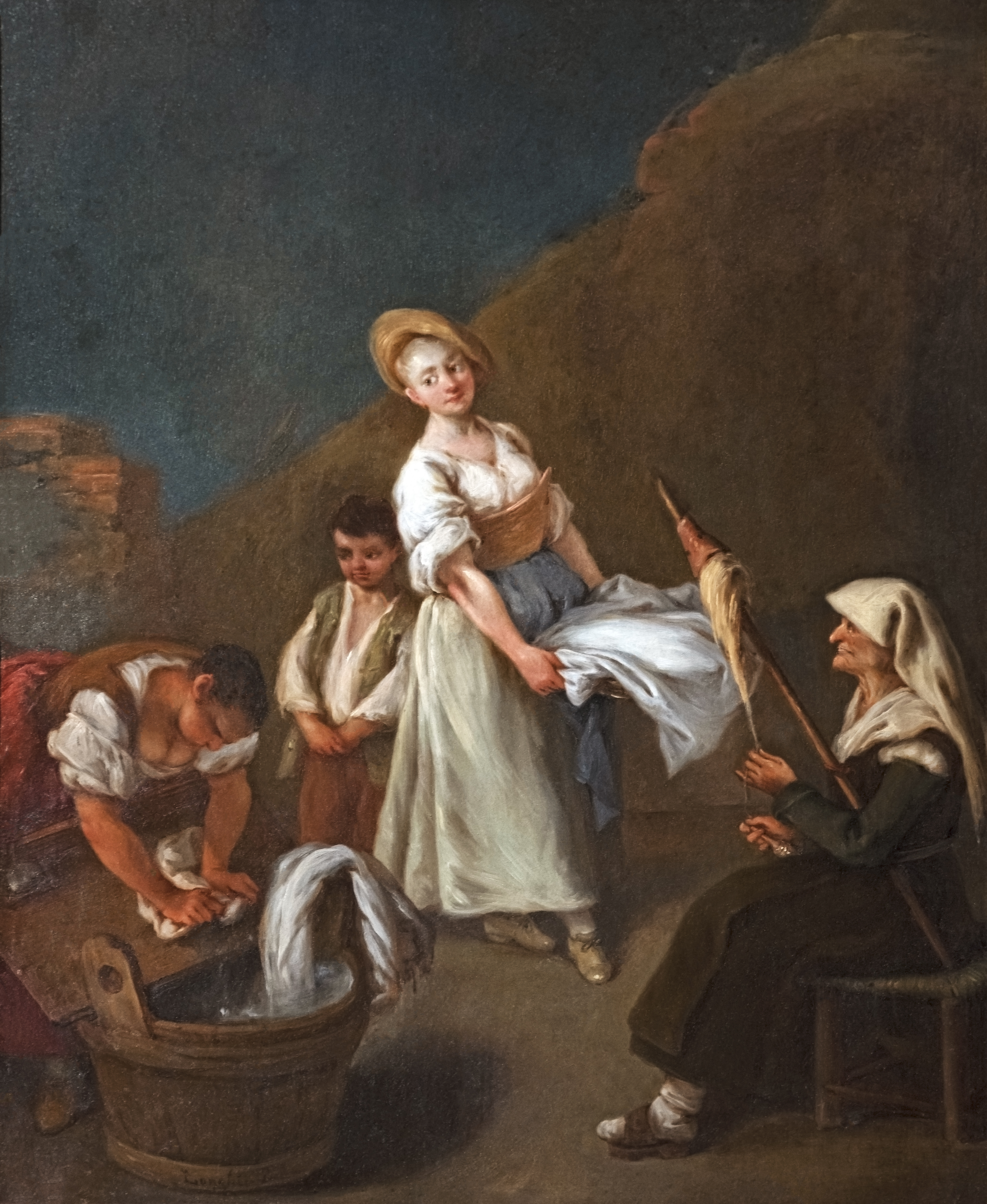
Le lavandaie 1740

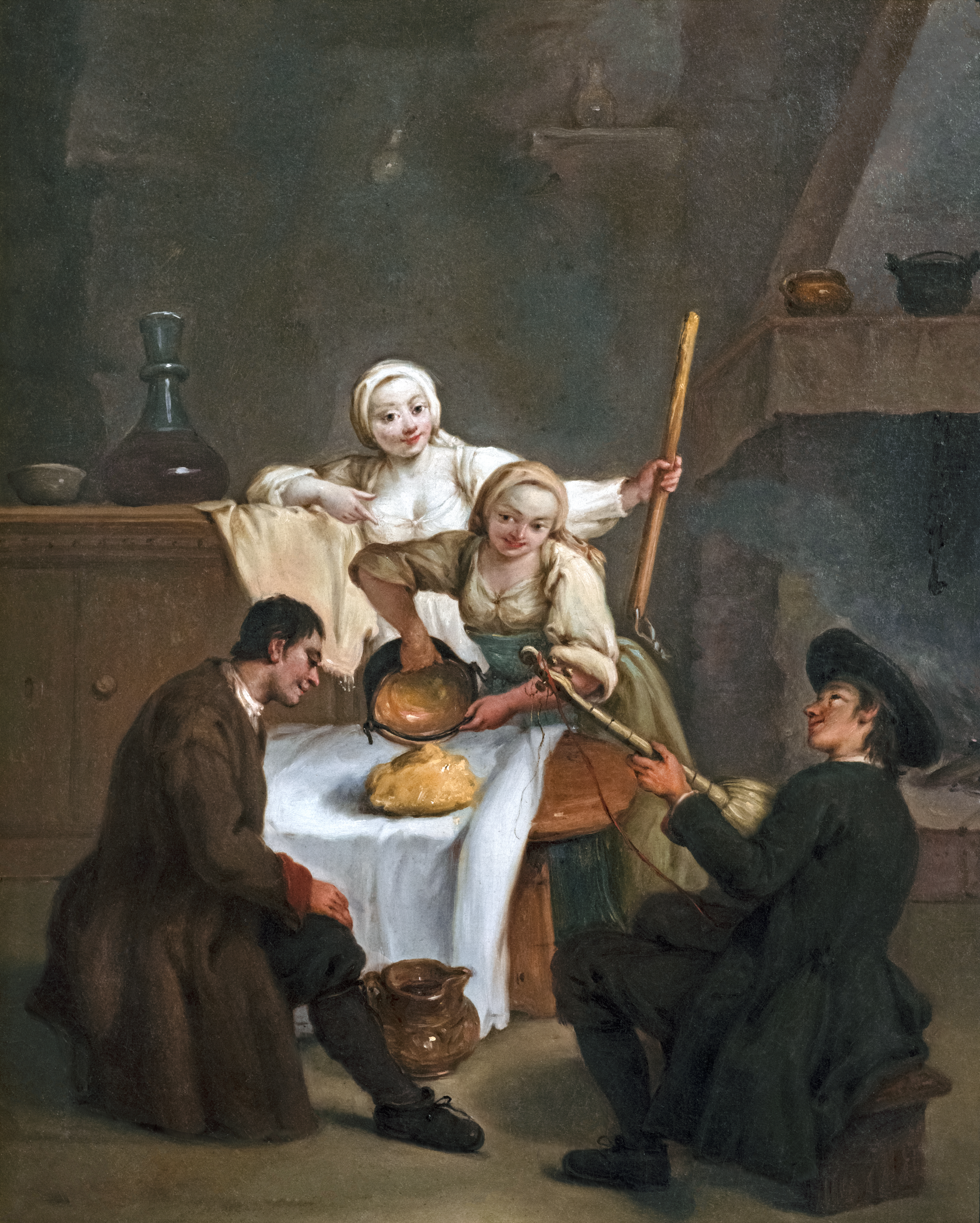
La Polenta 1740

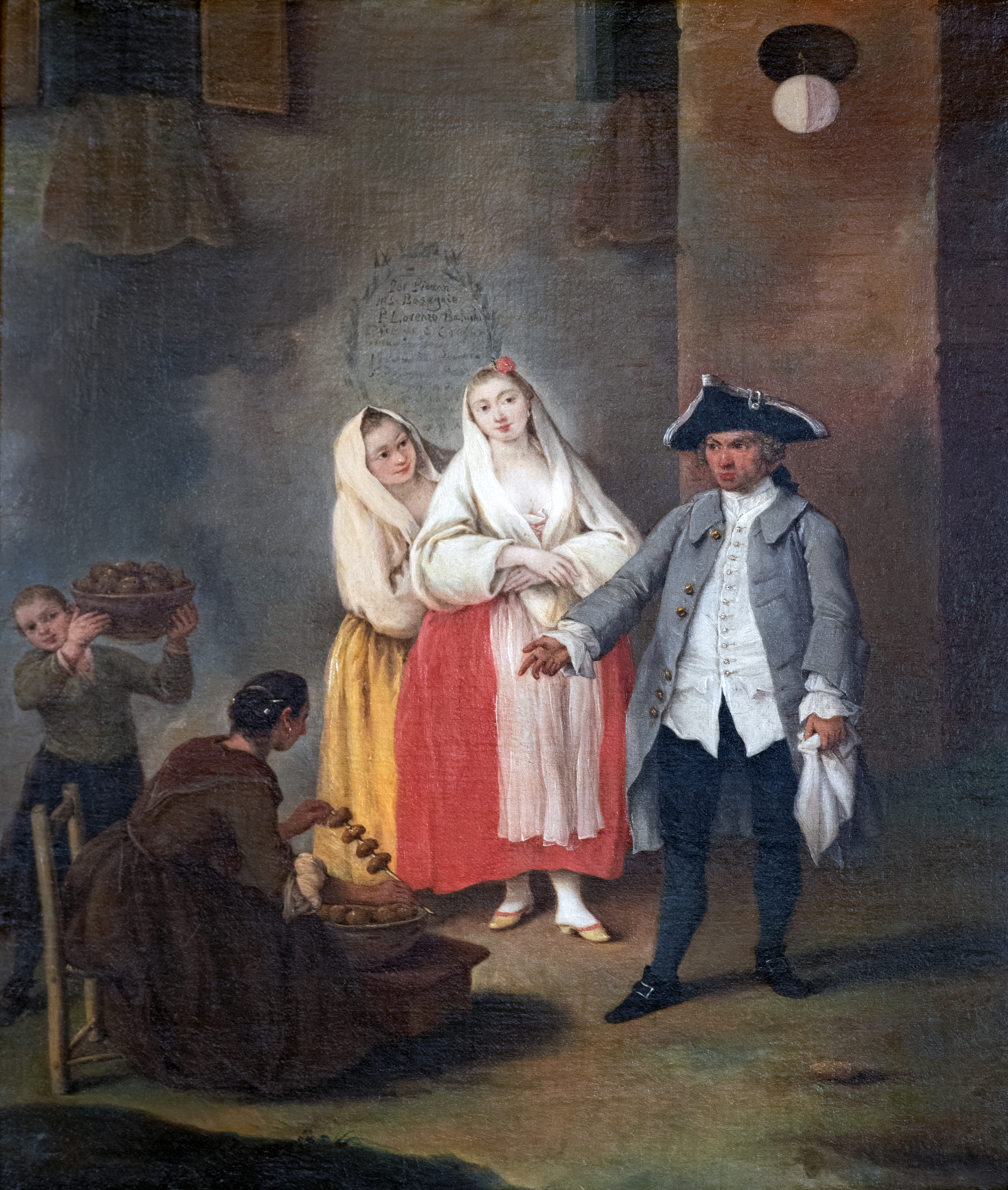
La venditrice di frittole 1755

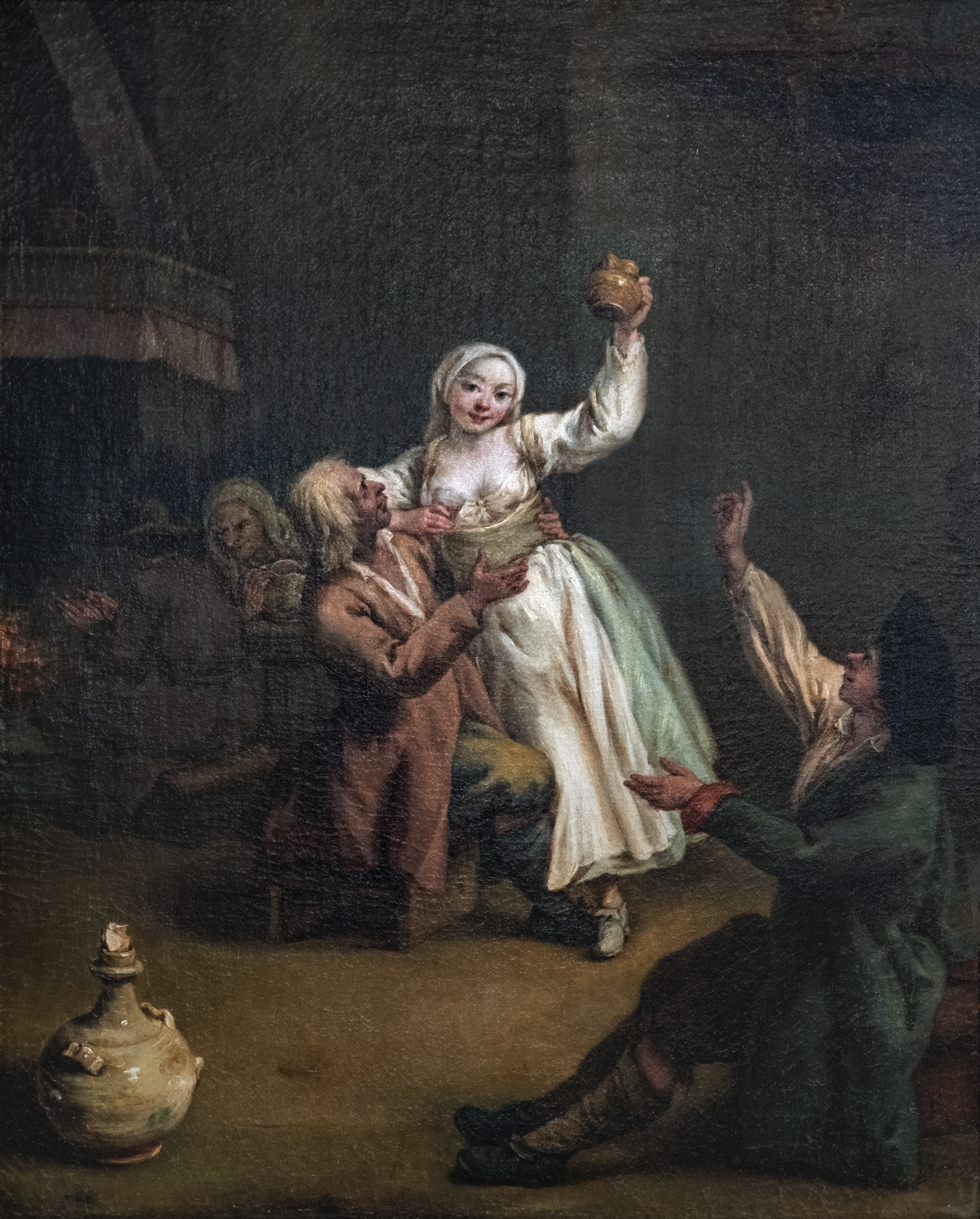
L'allegra coppia 1740

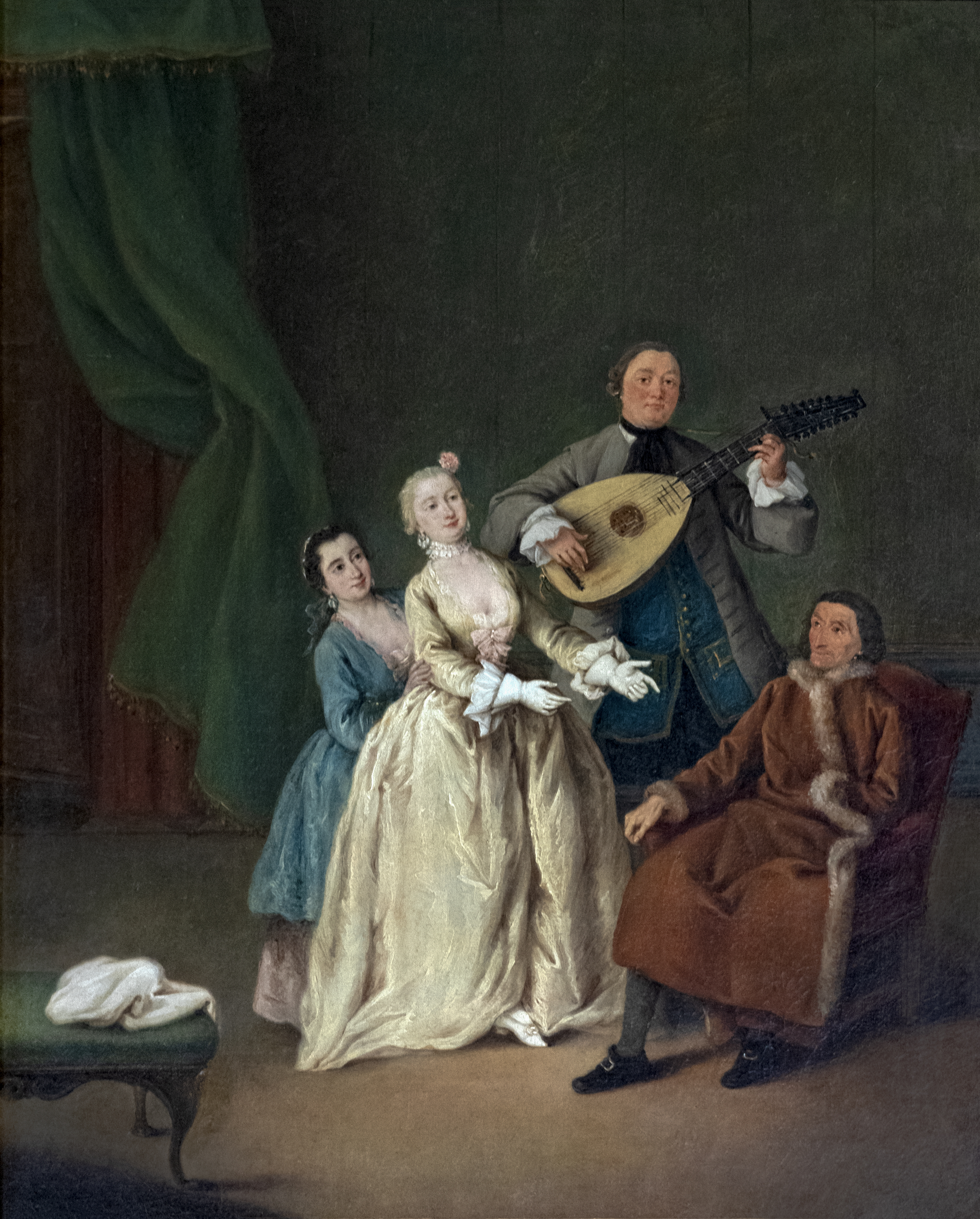
Il concertino in famiglia 1752

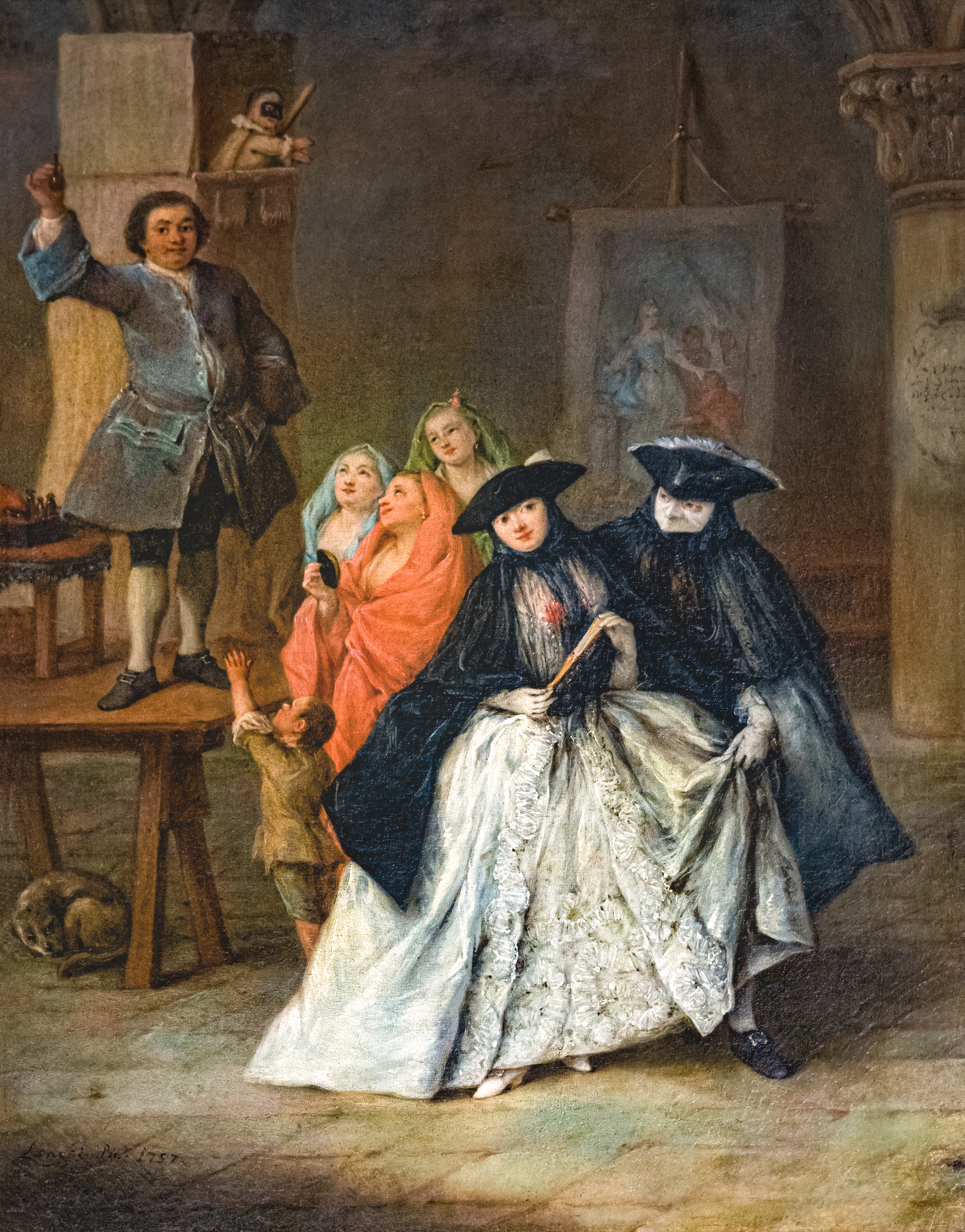
Il Ciarlatano 1757

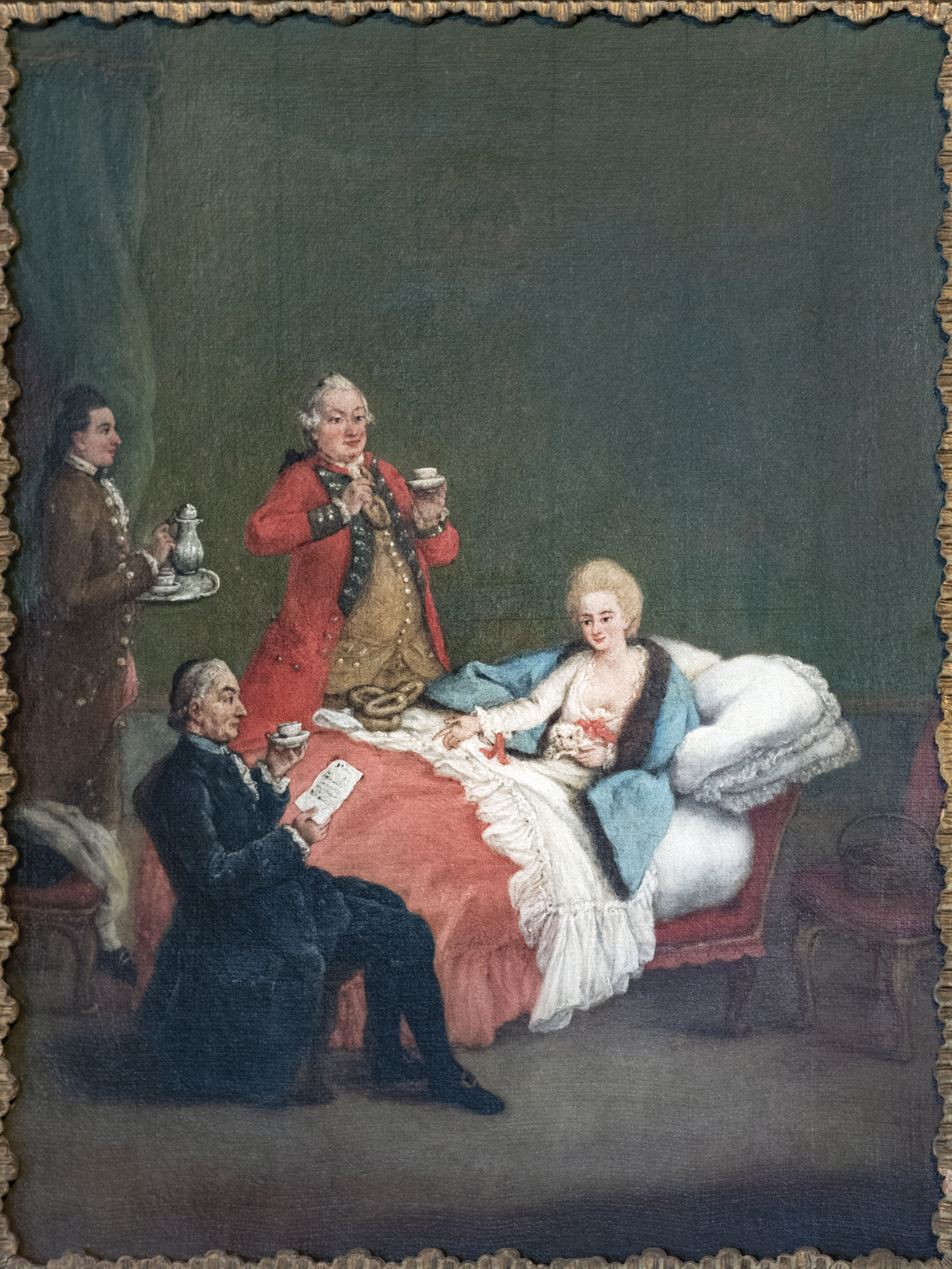
La cioccolata del mattino 1775

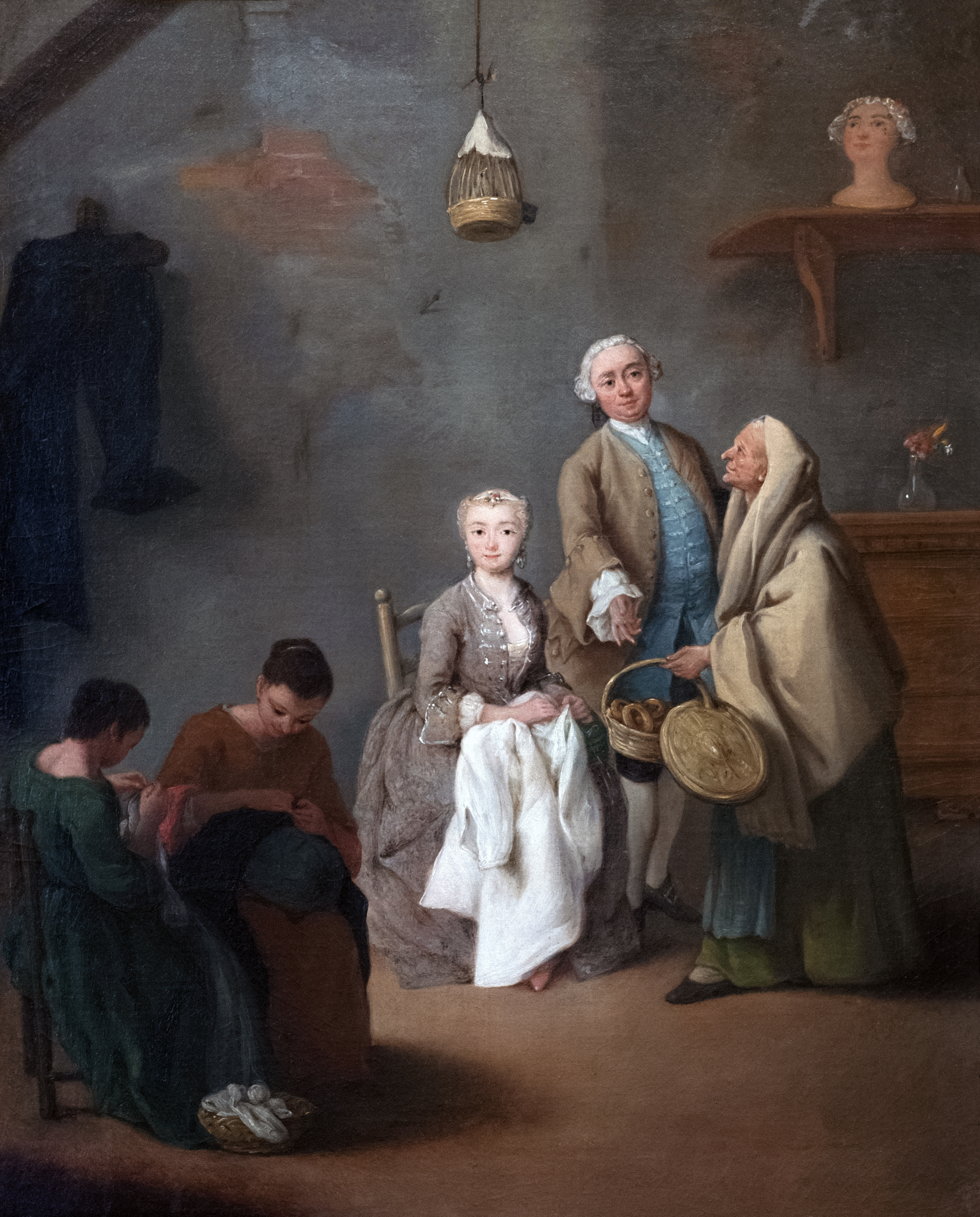
La scuola di lavoro 1752

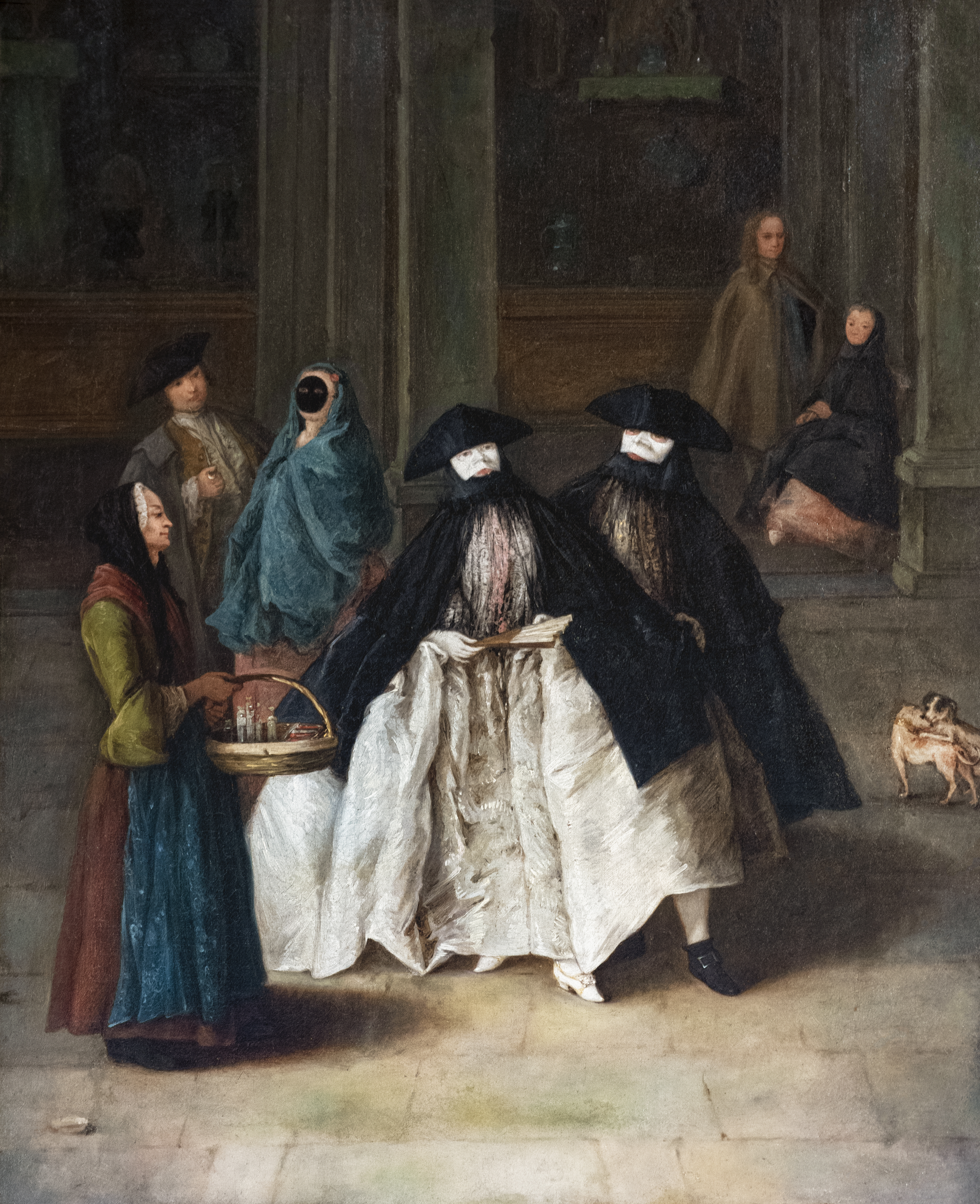
La venditrice di essenze 1756

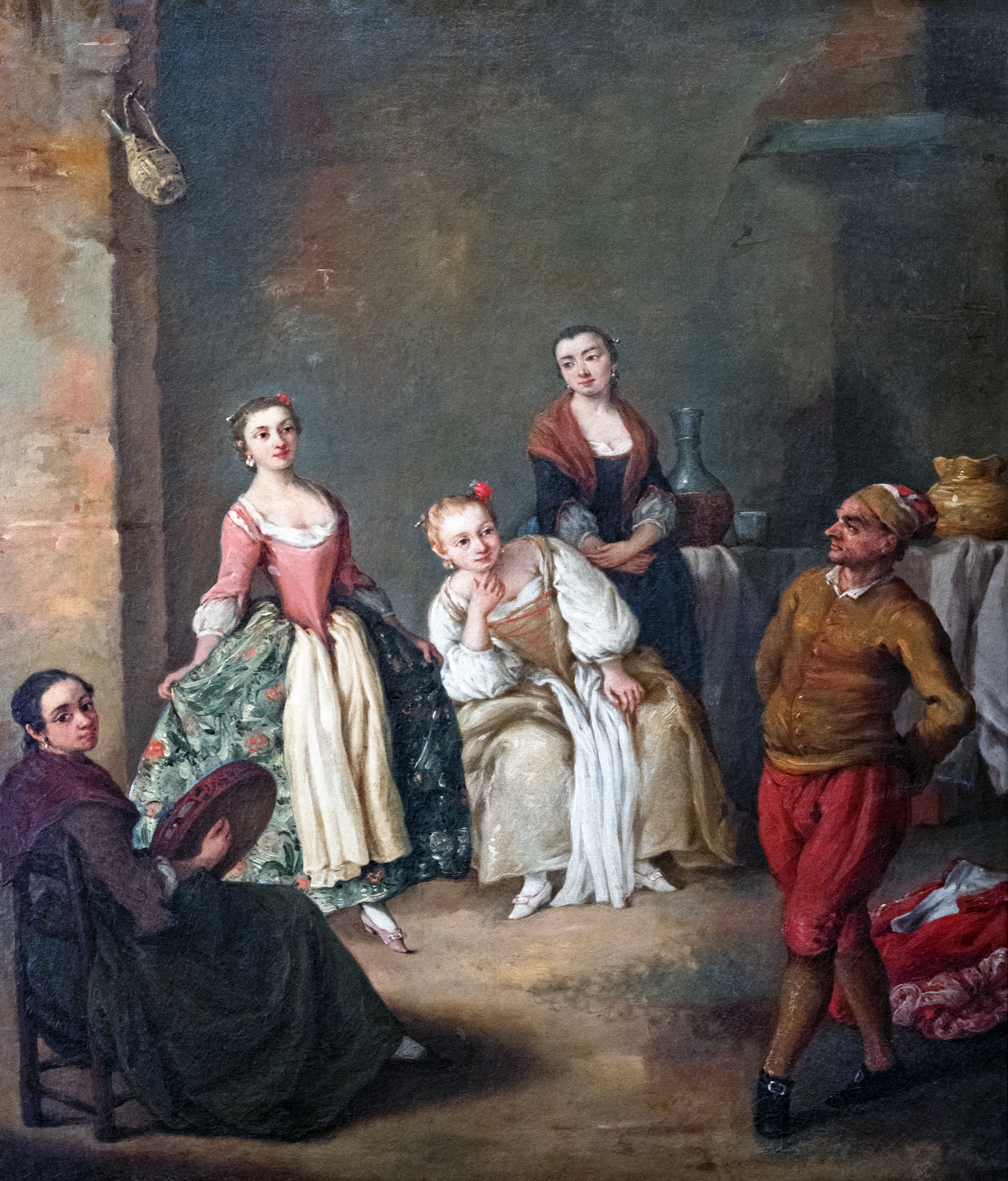
La furlane 1750

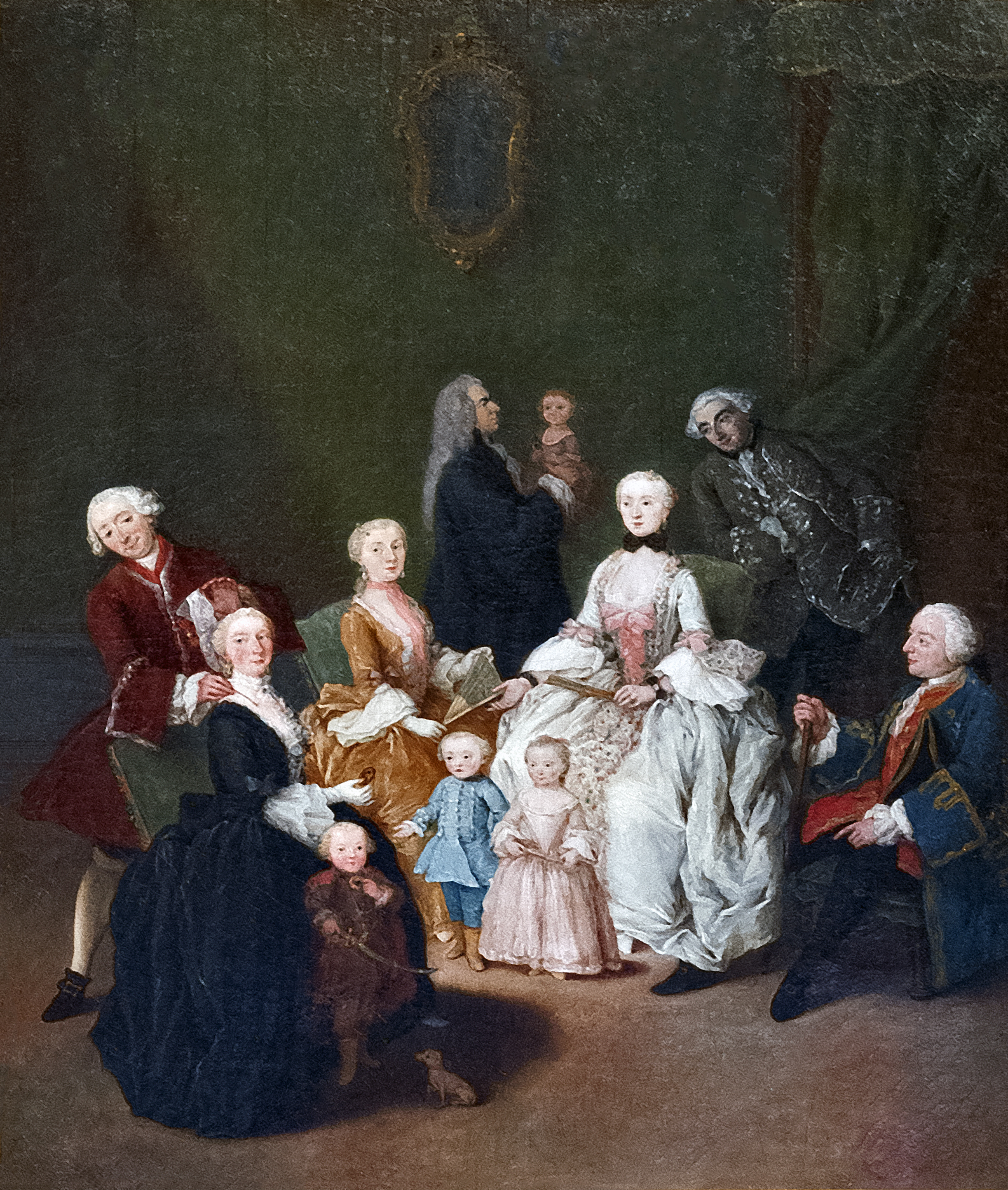
Famiglia Patrizia 1755

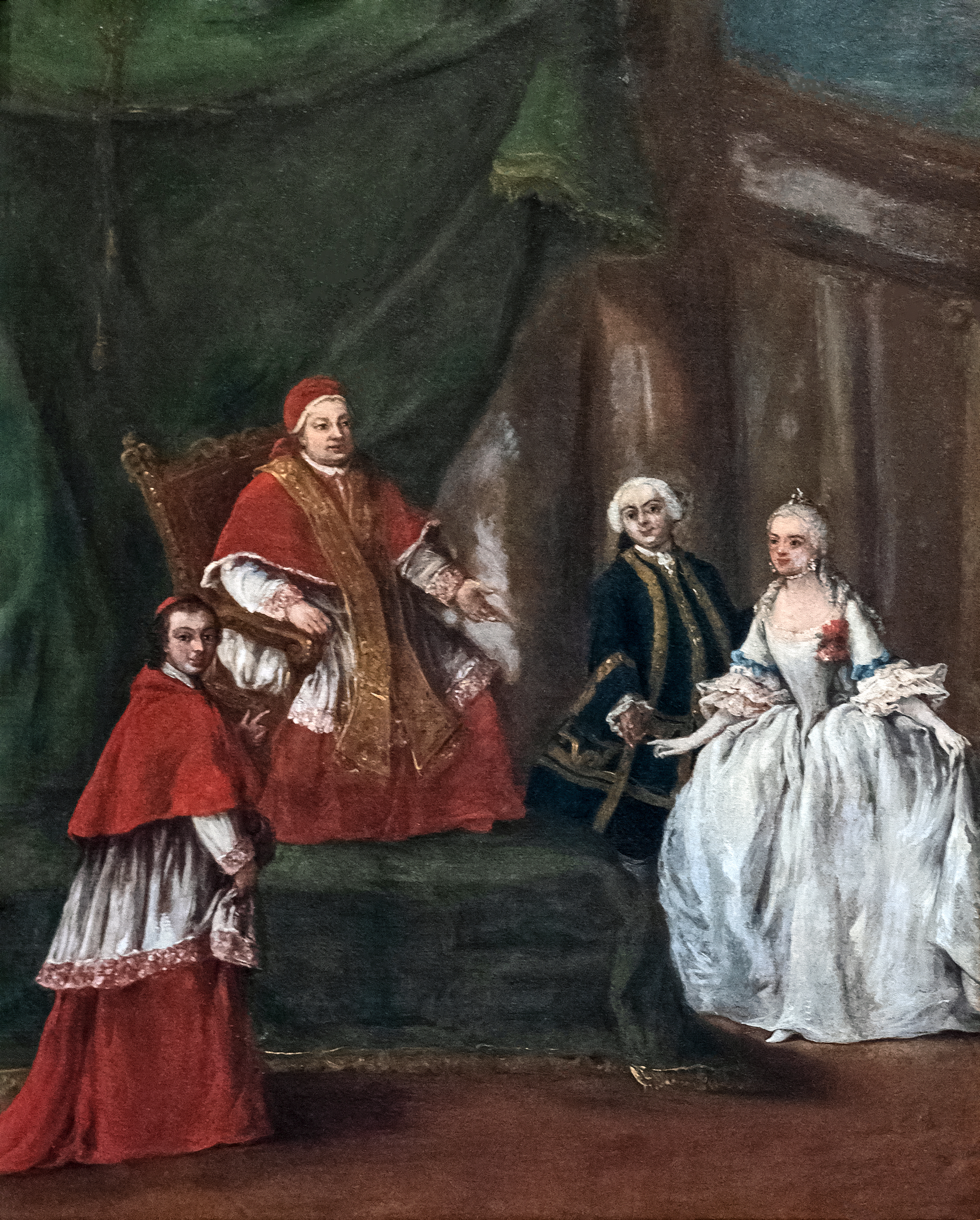
La famiglia Rezzonico 1758

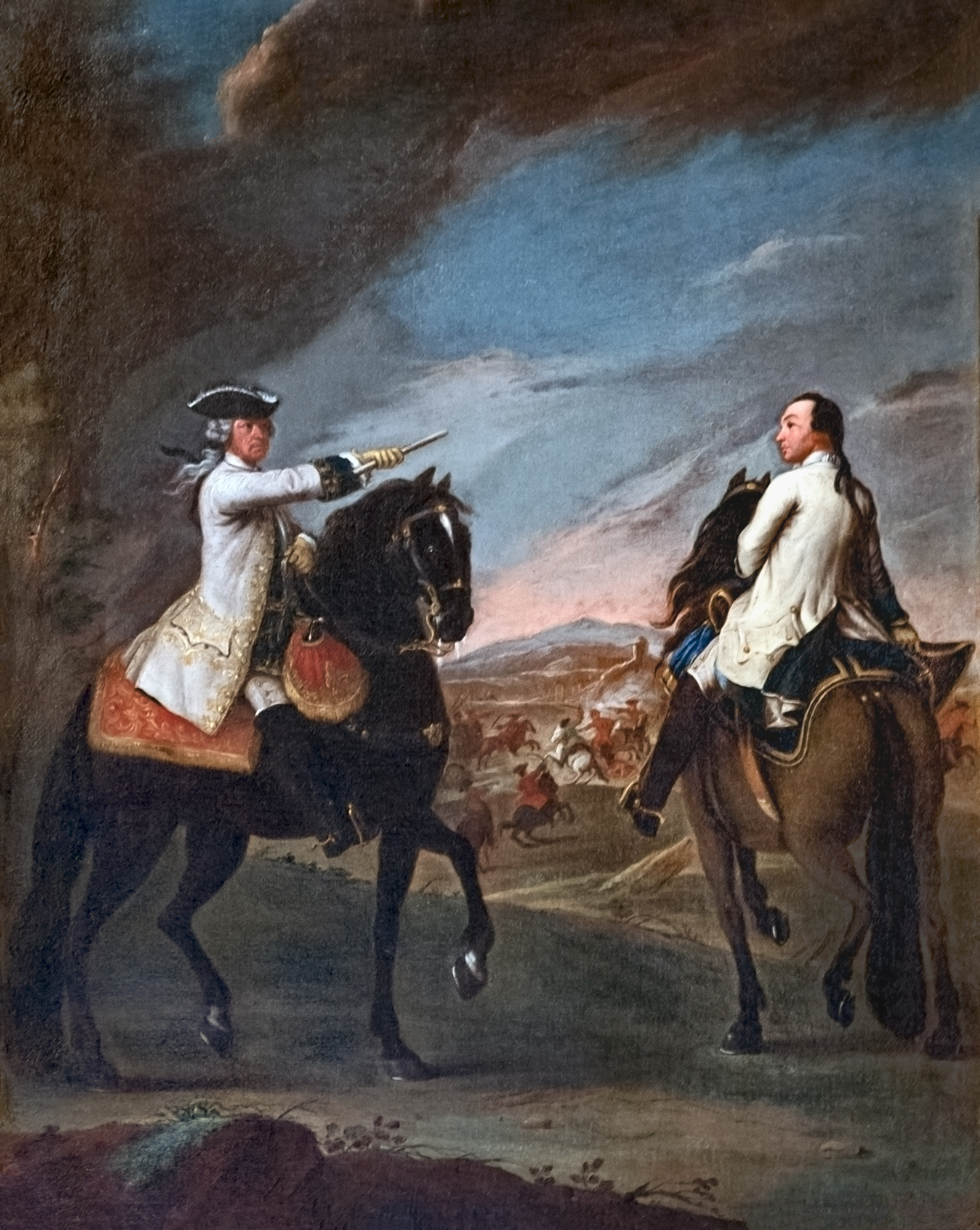
Portrait of William Graham (2e duc de Montrose) 1755

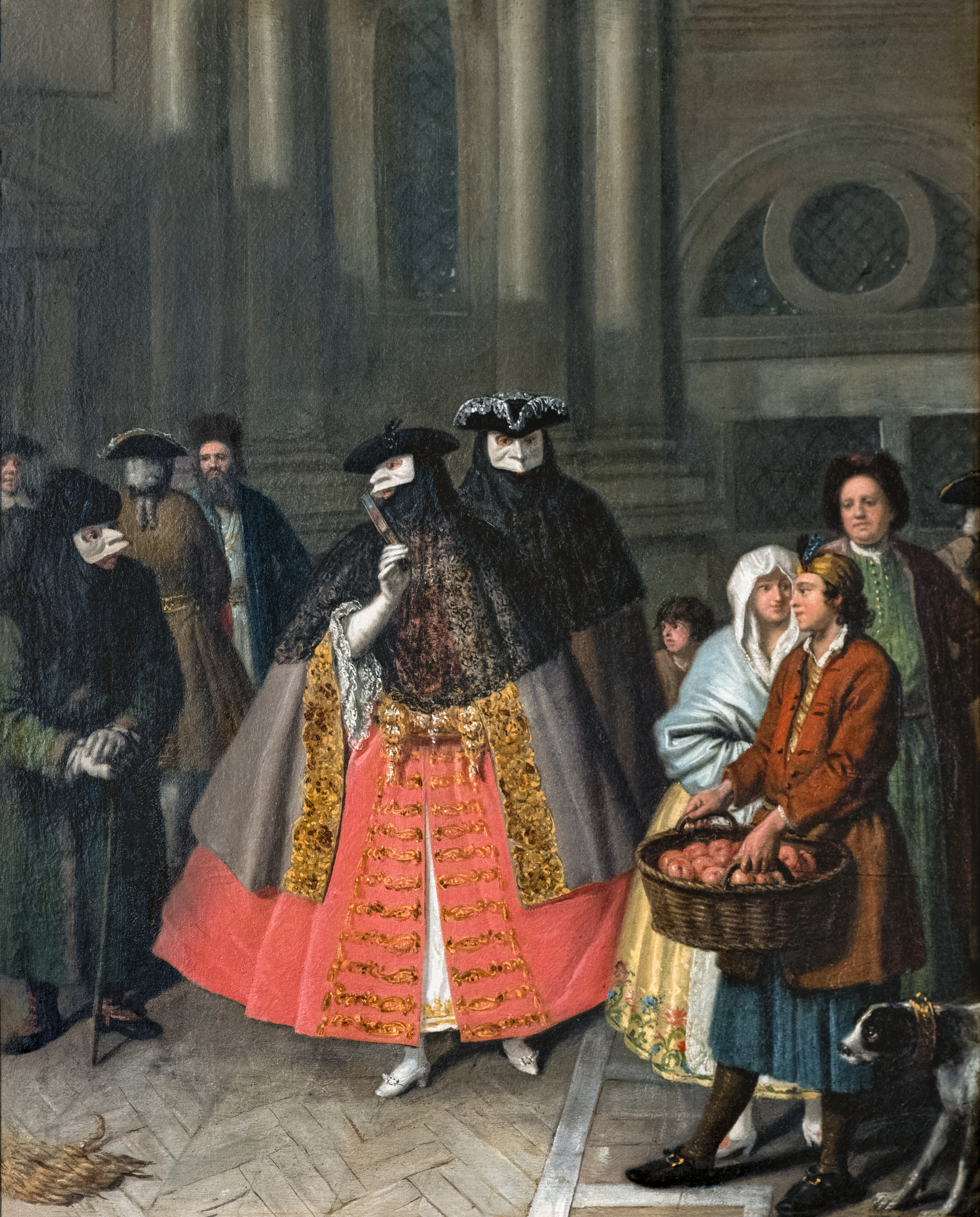
Colloquio fra baute 1760

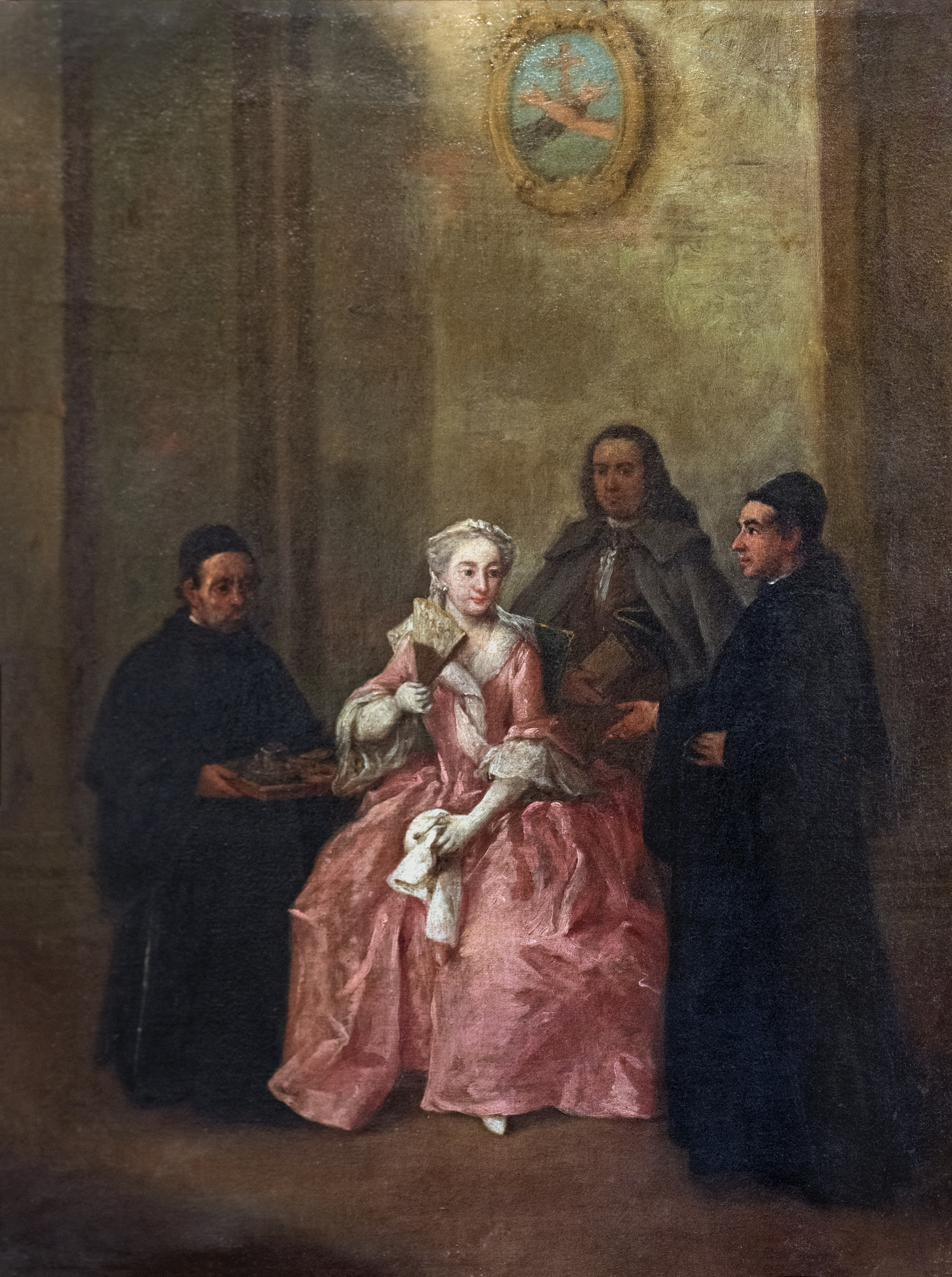
La visita al convento 1760

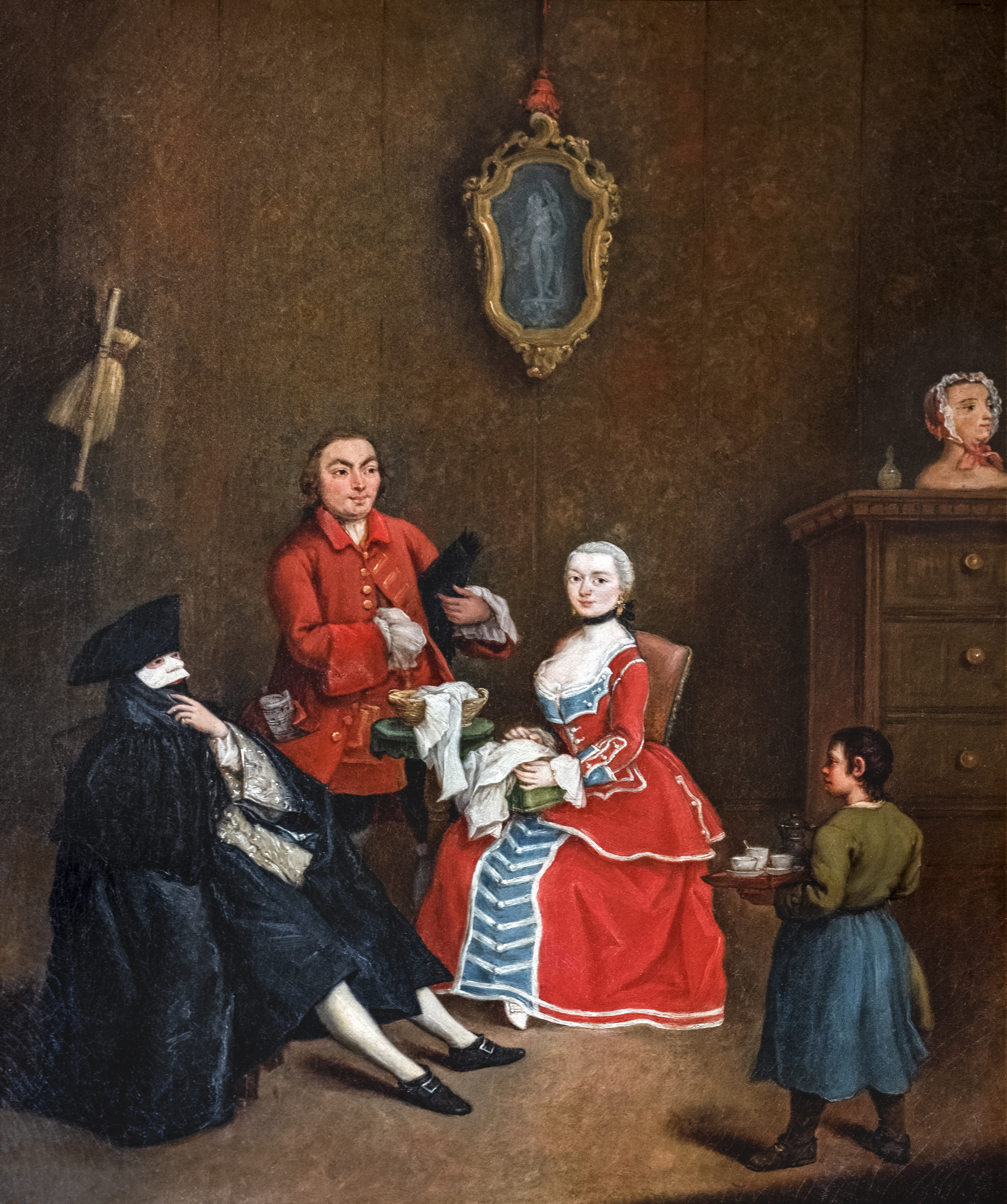
La visita in bauta 1760

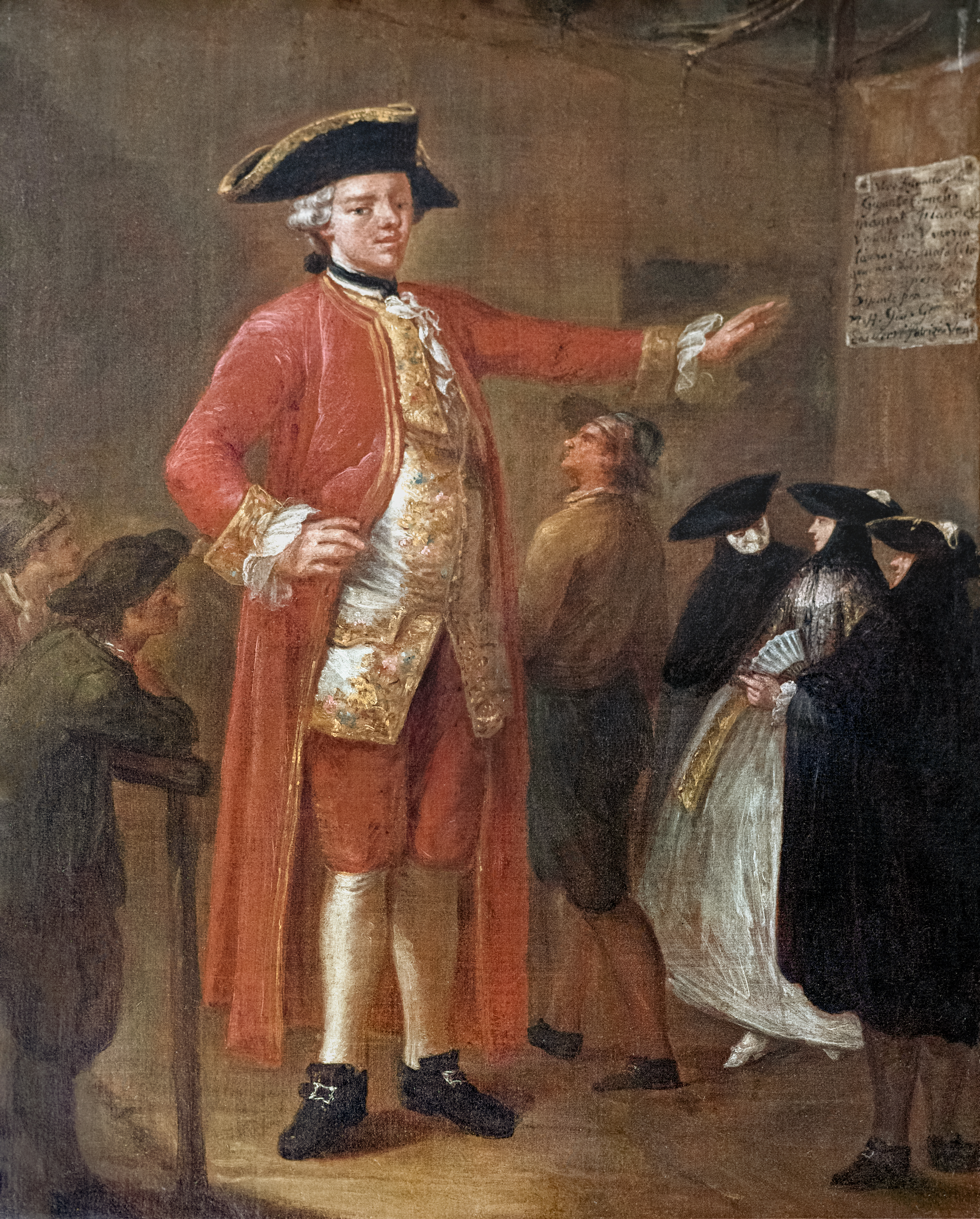
Il gigante Magrath 1760

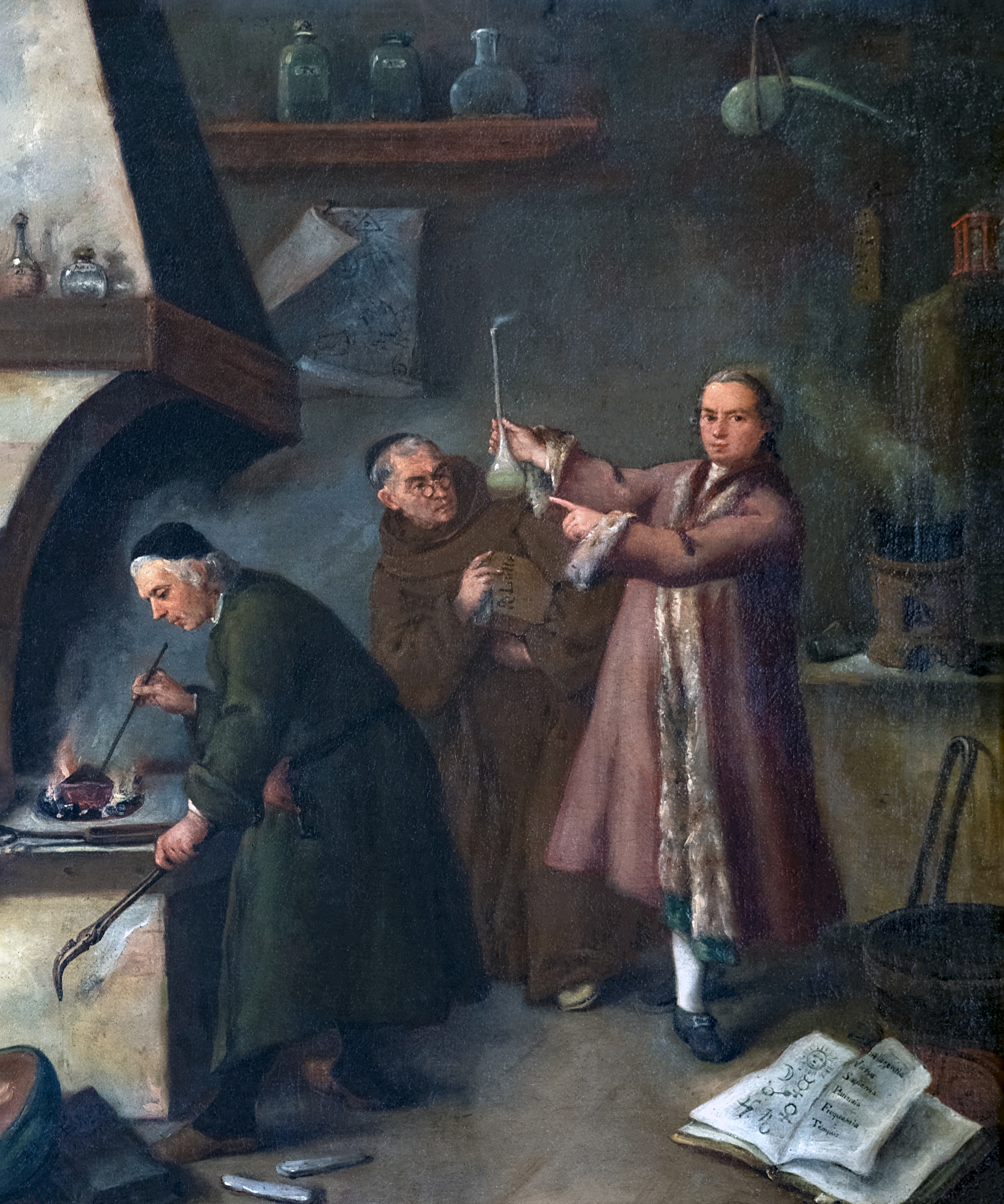
Gli alchimisti 1757

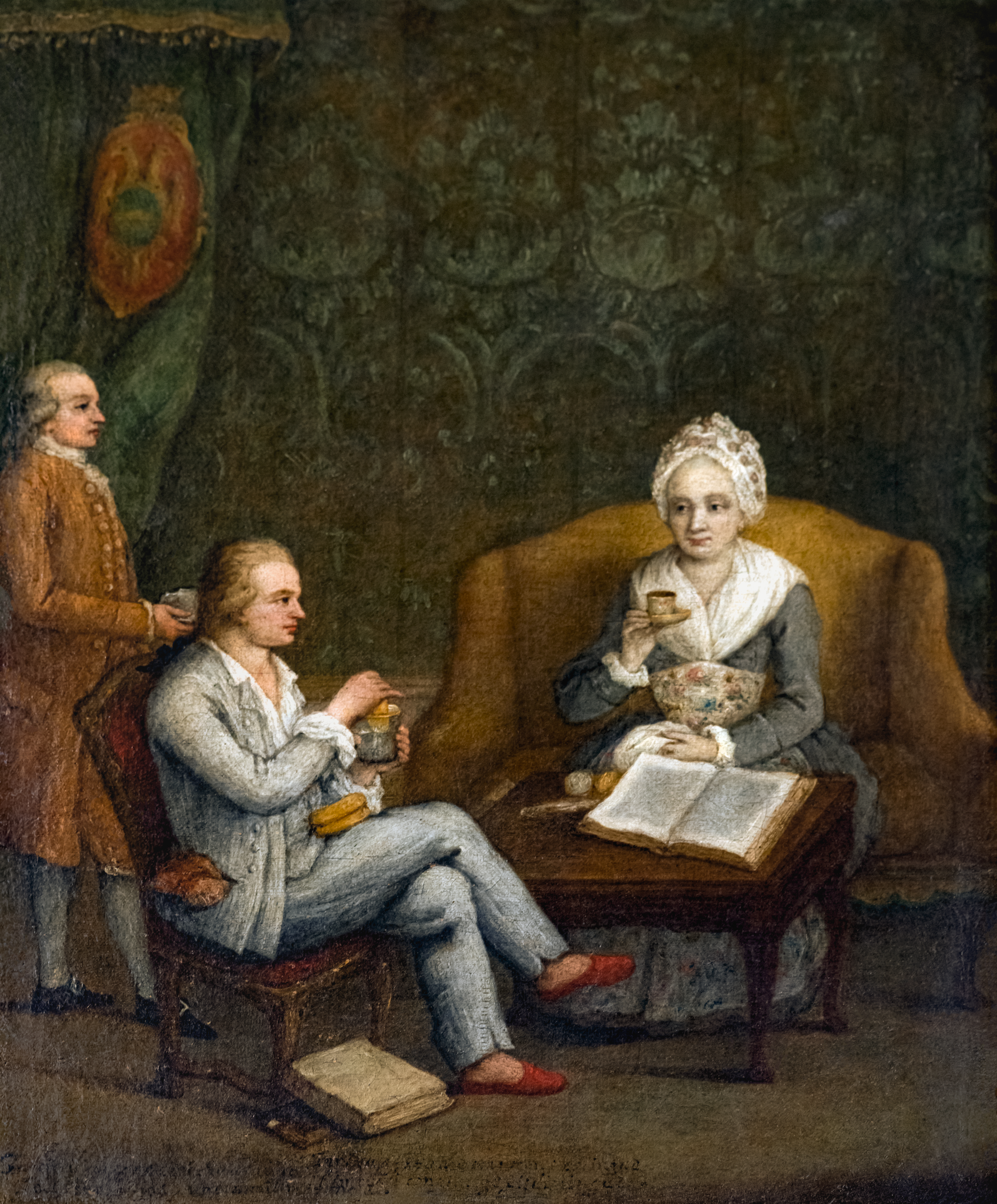
Ritratto di Adriana Giustinian Barbarigo 1776-1779

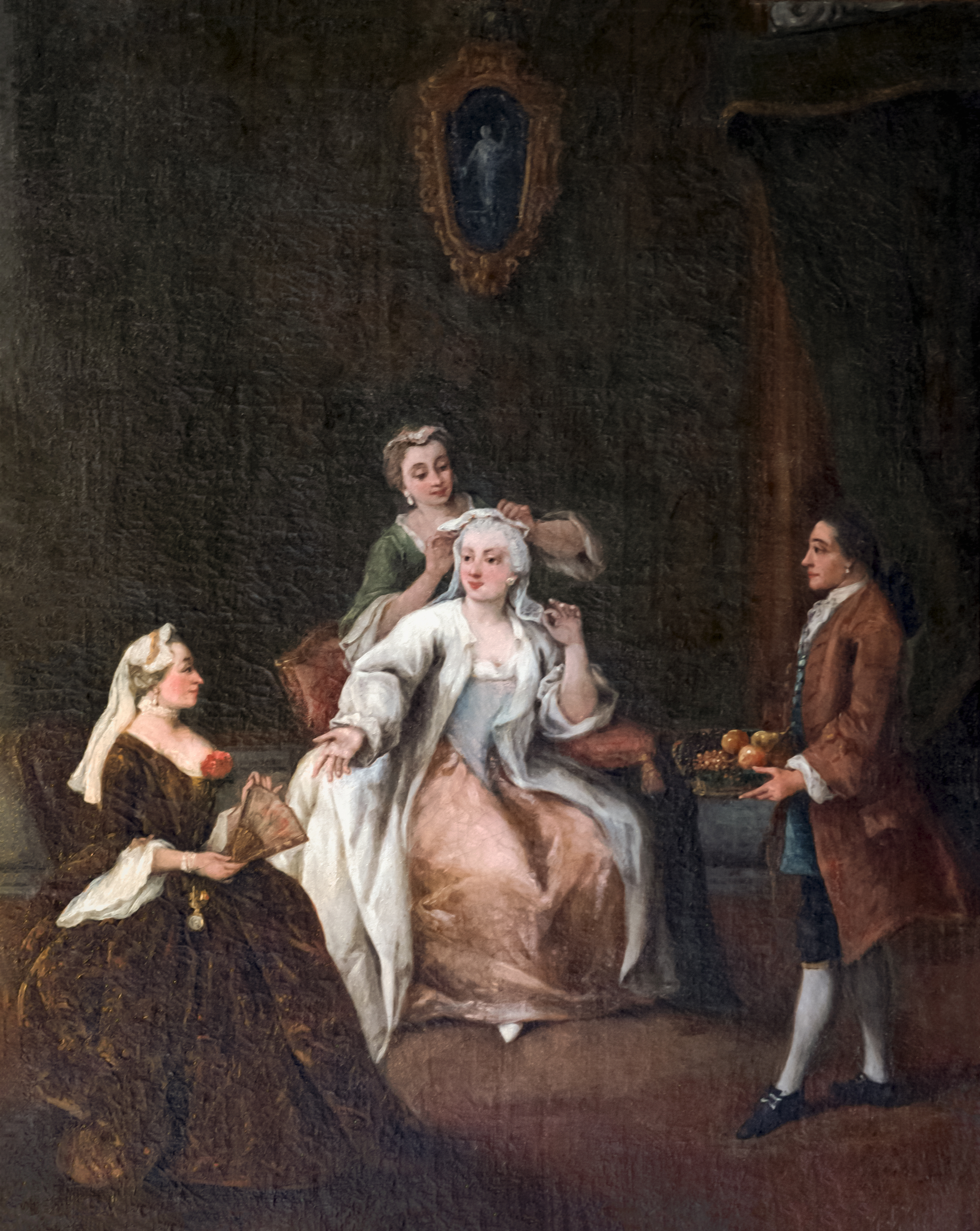
La pettinatrice 1760

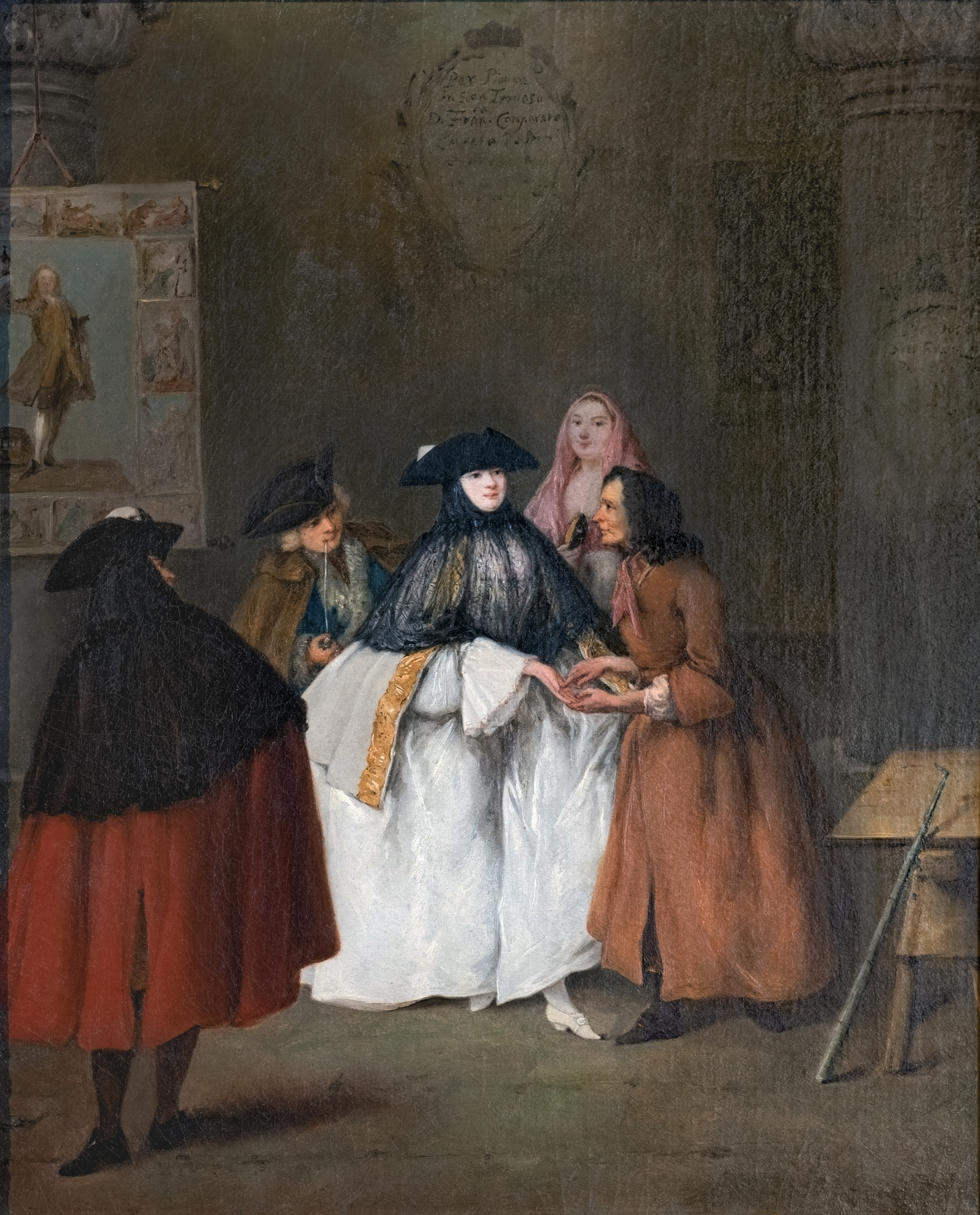
L'indovina 1752

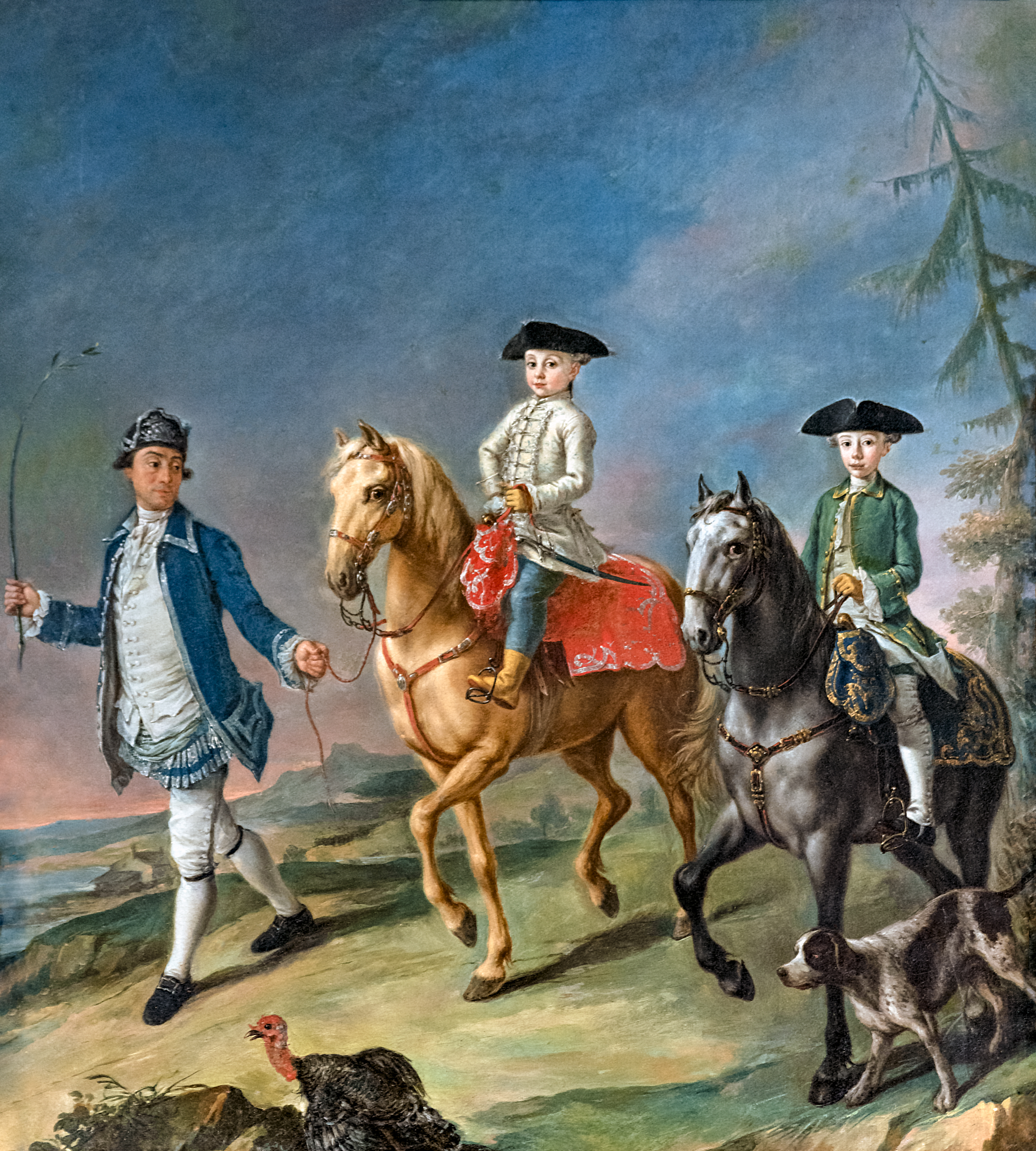
La passaggiata a cavallo 1755-1760

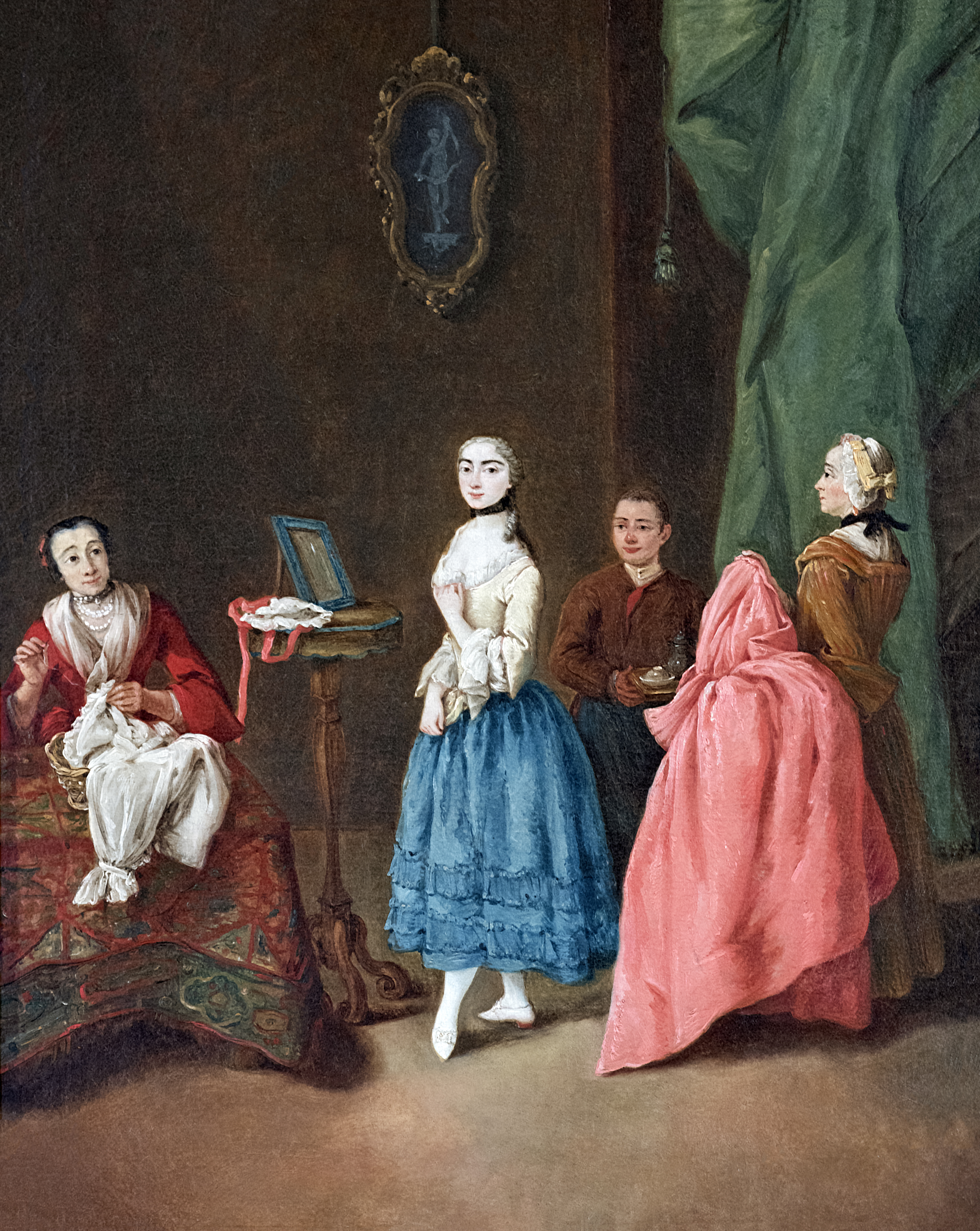
La prova dell'abito 1760

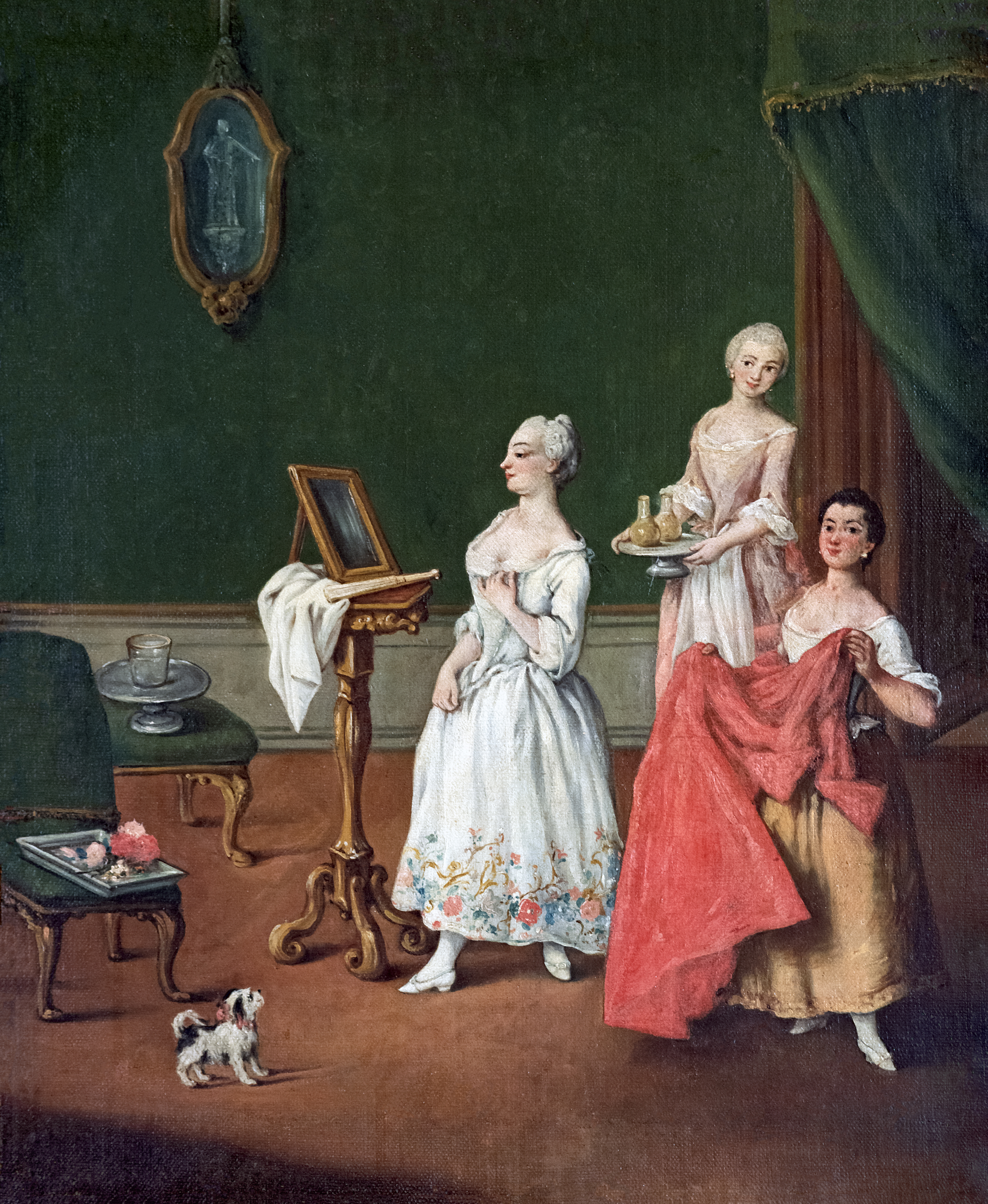
La toeletta 1760

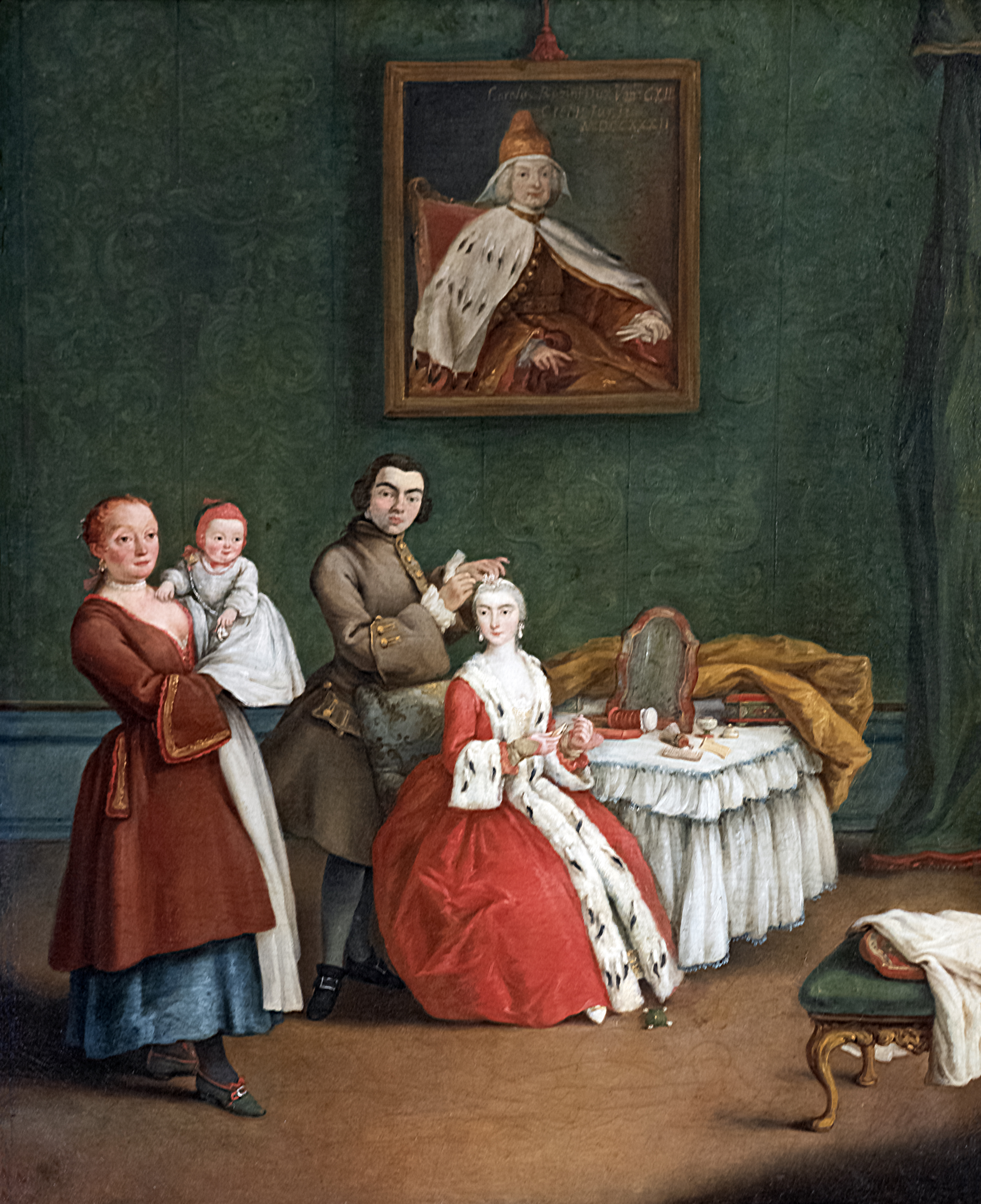
Il parrucchiere 1760

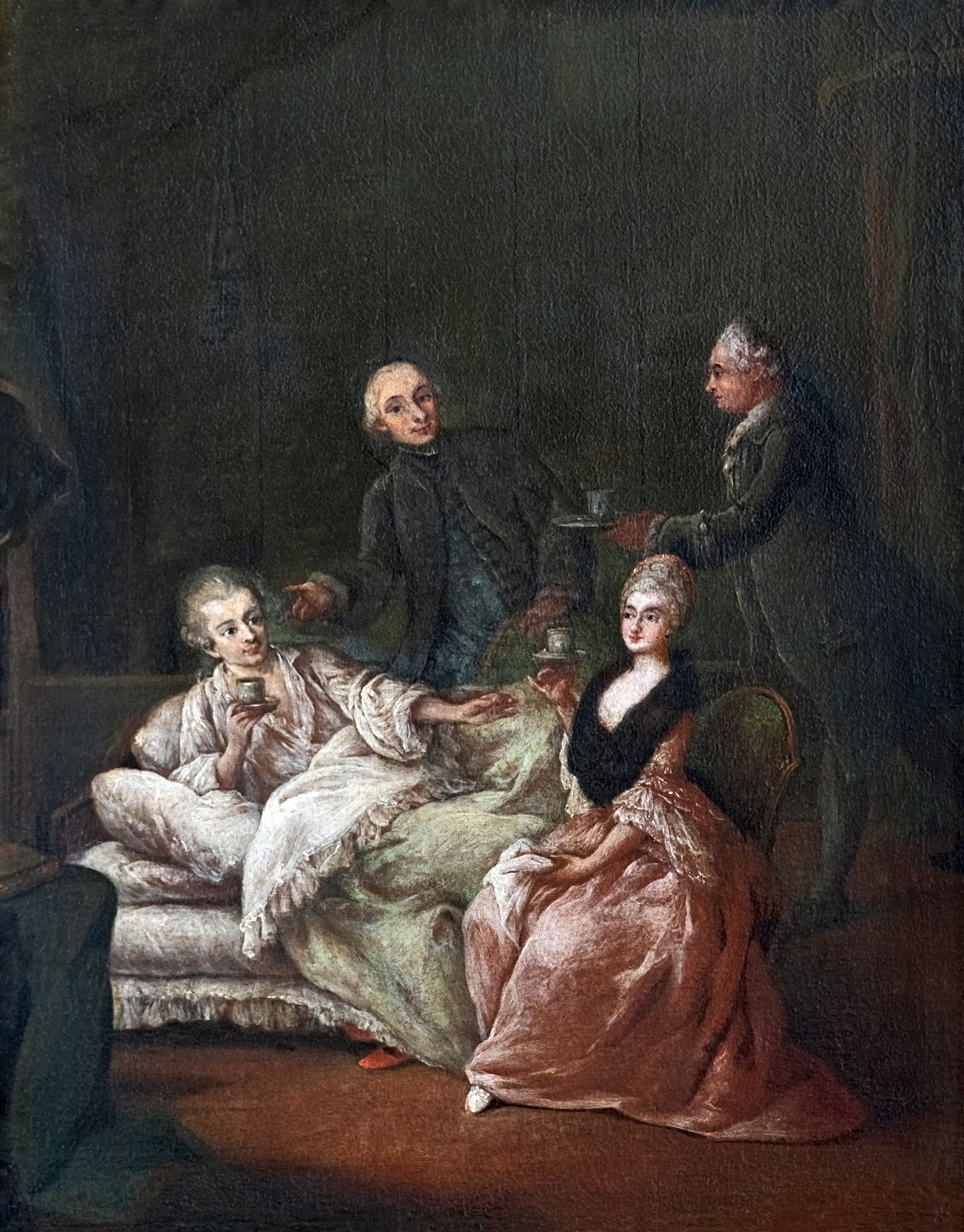
Visita all'ammalato 1774

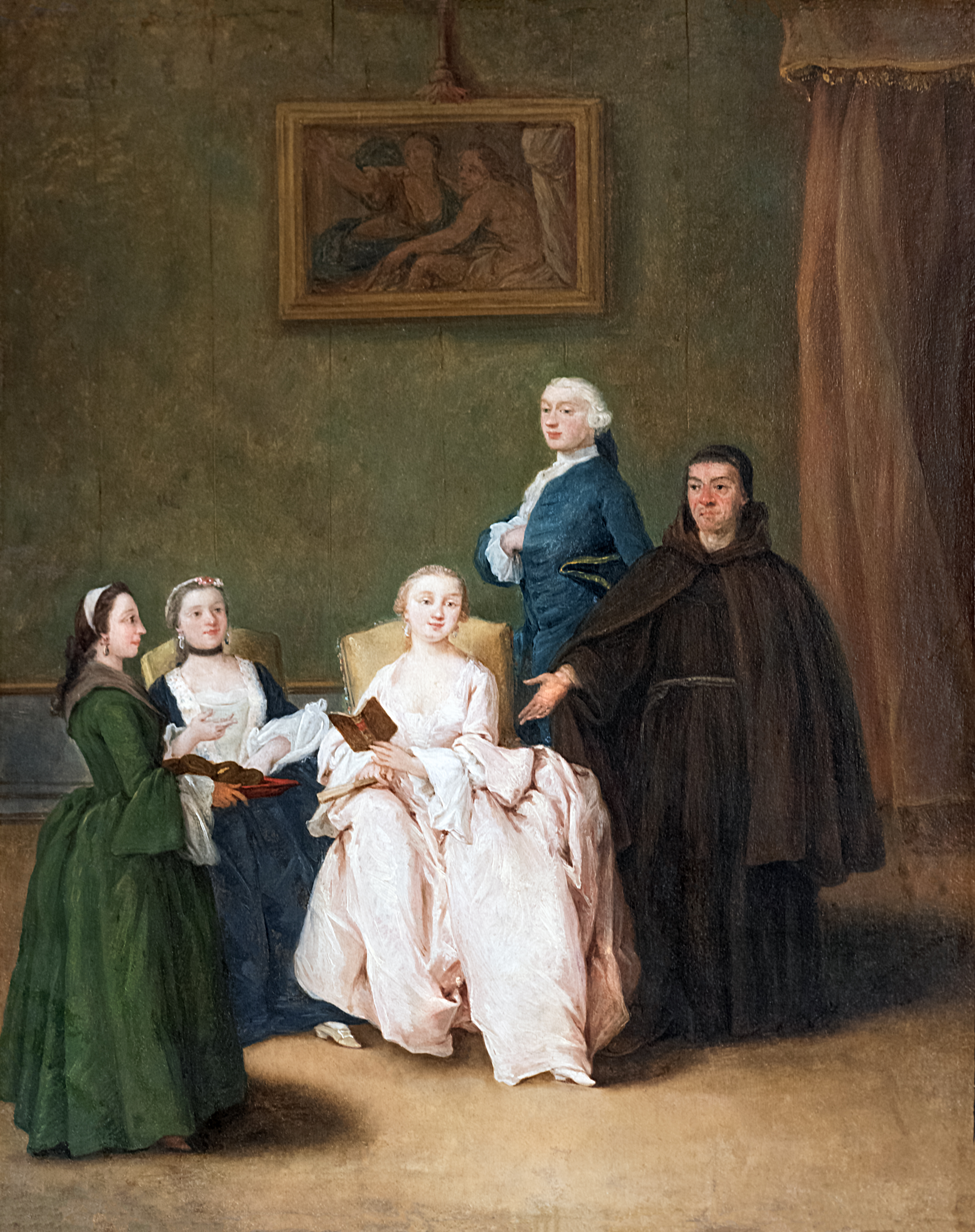
Visita del frate 1775

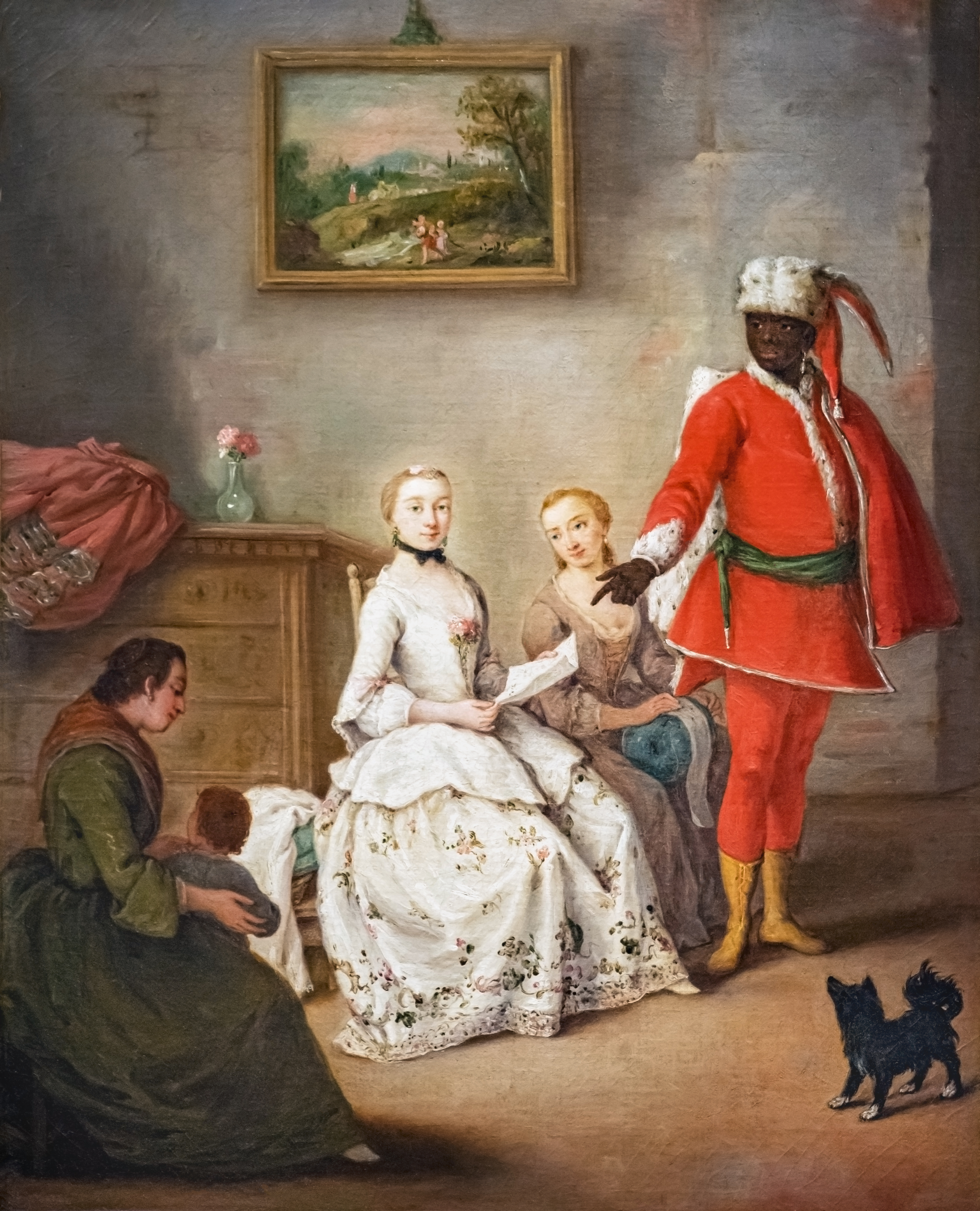
L'ambasciata del moro 1751

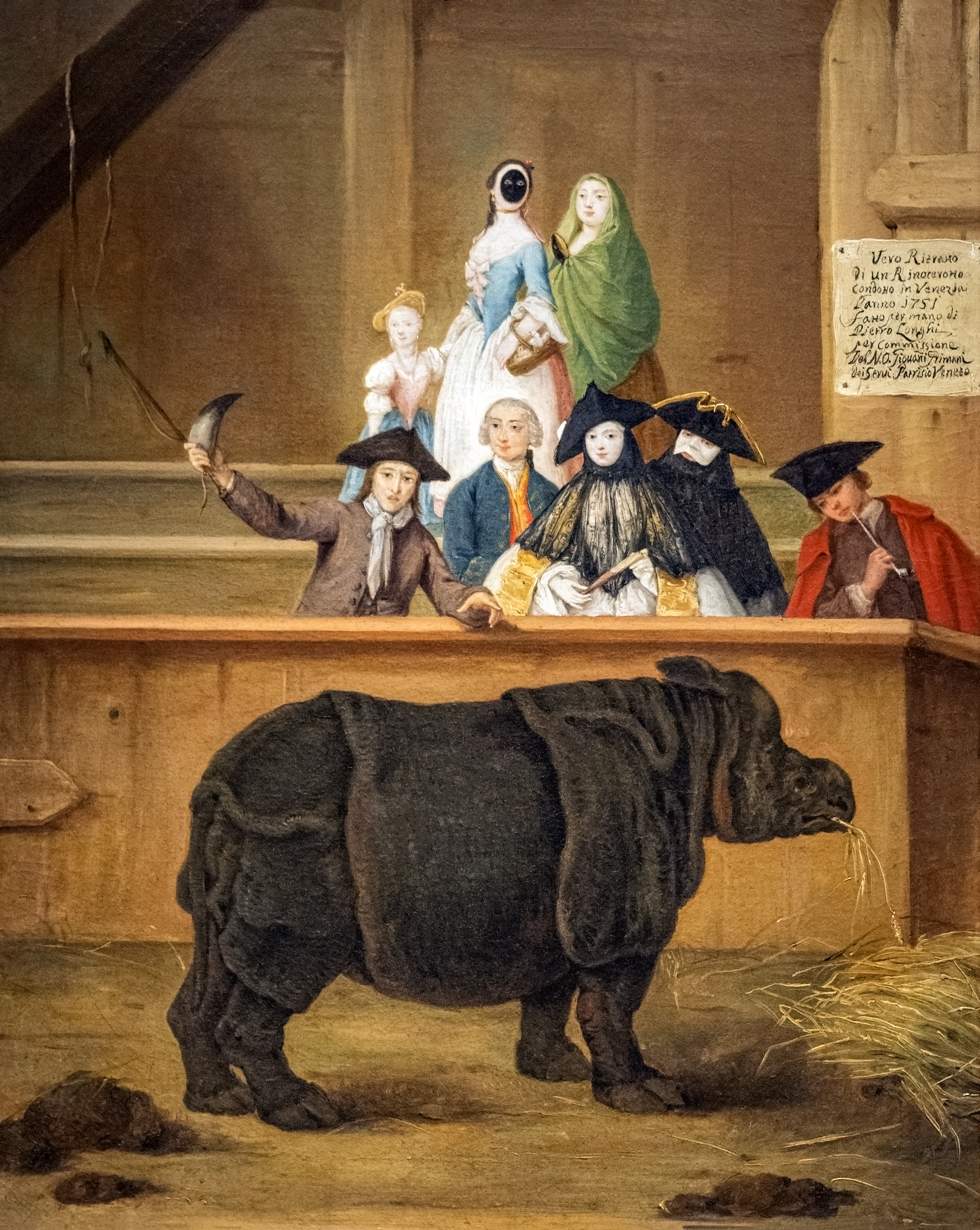
Il rinoceronte 1751

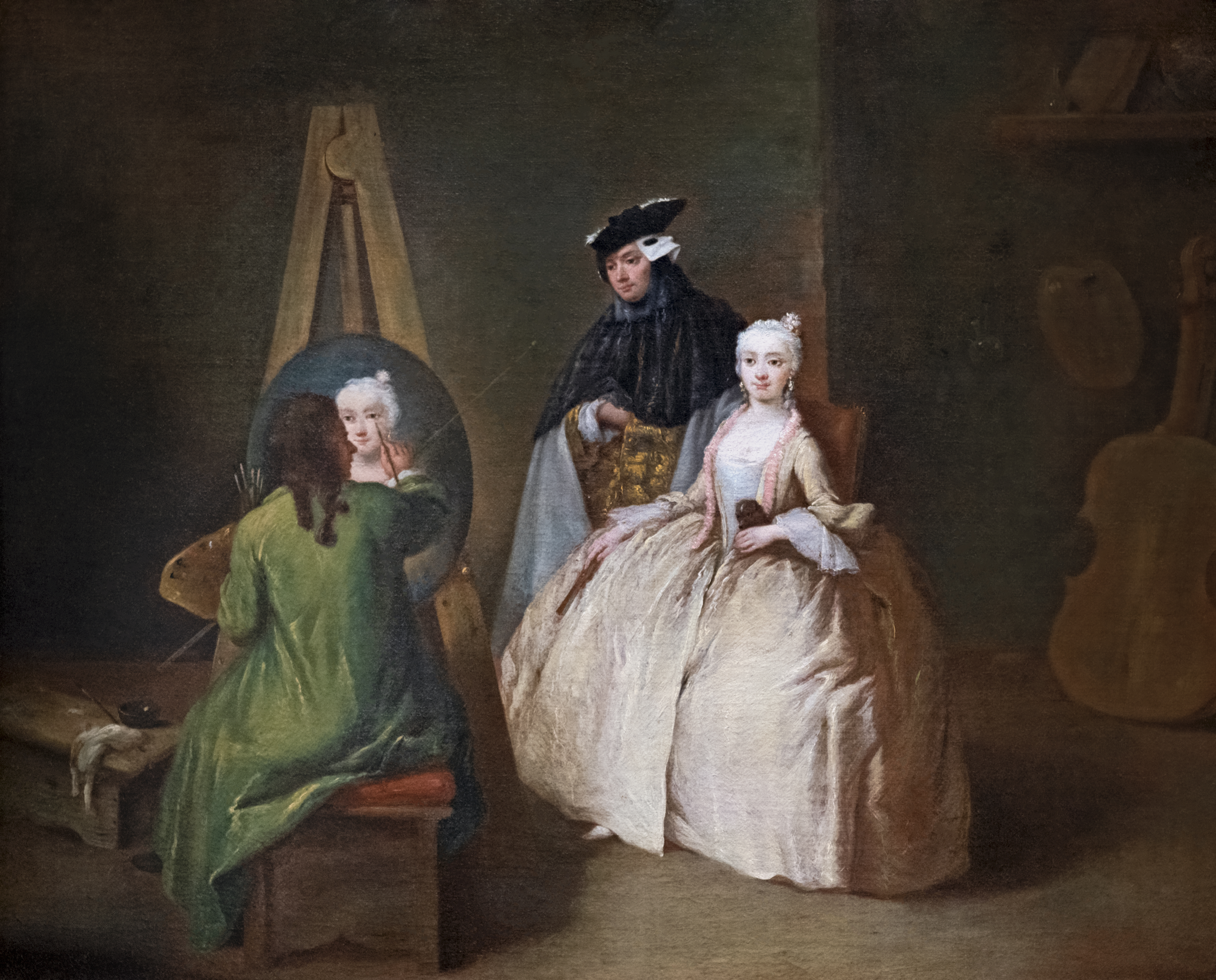
L'atelier del pittore 1740

=== Green lacquer room ===
The decoration of this piece (Sala delle Lacche Verdi) is a set of furniture painted green and gold, called Salotto Calbo-Crotta with chinoiserie motifs, very popular in Venetian eighteenth century. The set comes from Palazzo Calbo Crotta in Cannaregio. On the ceiling of the hall is the fresco of Giovanni Antonio Guardi's triumph of Diana, from the Barbarigo-Dabalà palace to Angelo Raffaele. The allegorico-mythological work, created in the 1850s, is a perfect example of the talent of the artist in the style of rock, bright and full of fantasy. The walls of the room are decorated with vedute and landscapes.

- Landscape with monks and travelers and Landscape with mill and laundress by Marco Ricci, Italian vedute engraver and painter. Main initiator Venetian landscape in the eighteenth century.
- Caprice with an arch and Caprice with the fountain of Neptune by Luca Carlevarijs.
- Landscape with marine and Landscape with a caravan by Johann Anton Eismann, an Austrian painter born in Salzburg and active in Verona and Venice. He mainly painted scenes of port and battle genre. He died in Venice in 1698.
- Landscape with a waterfall and Landscape with a marine by Jacob de Heusch, Dutch painter of the golden century. He is known for his paintings of Italian landscapes.
- From Giuseppe Zais, already met in other rooms: Landscape, Landscape with shepherds, Landscape with milking
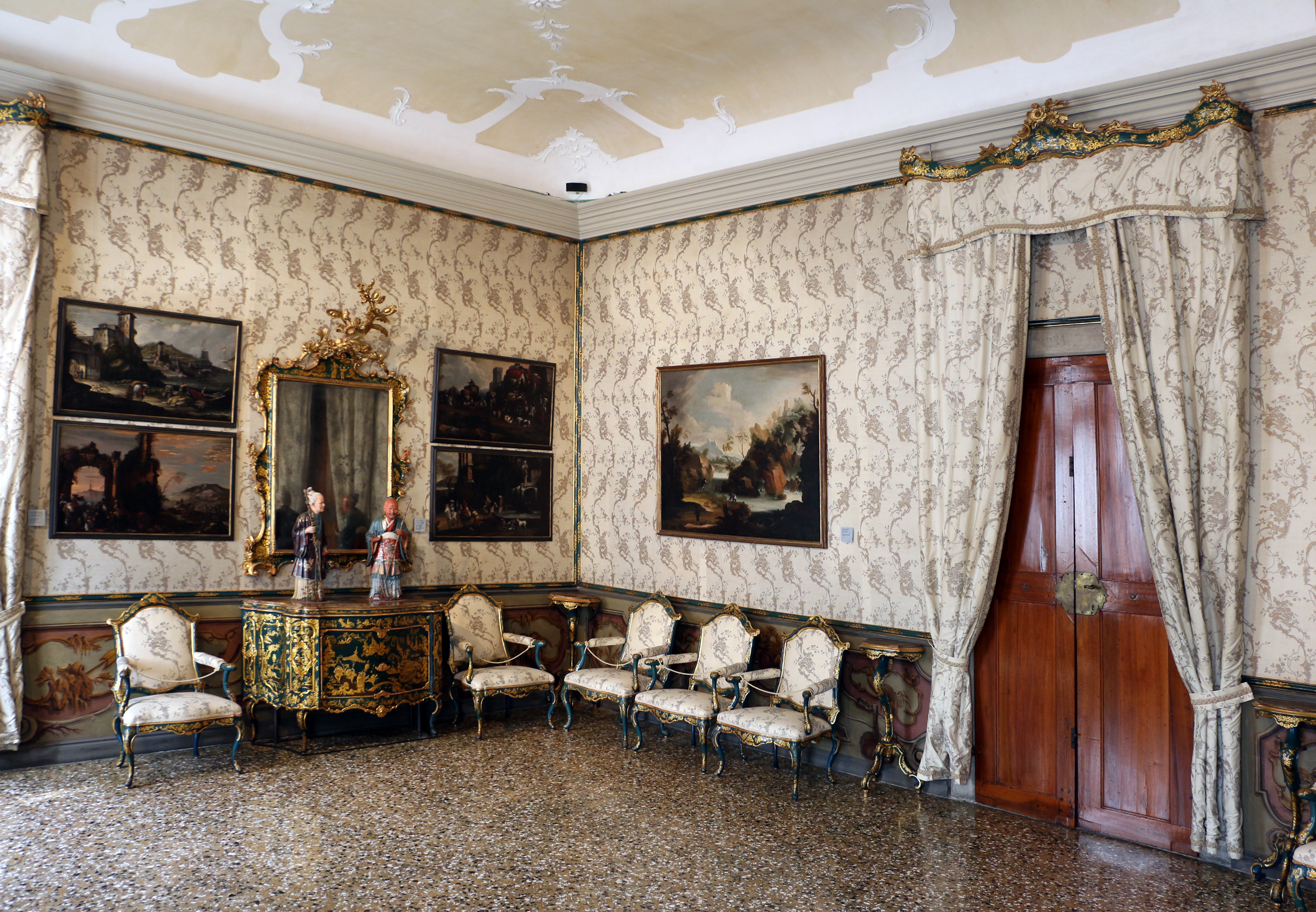
Green lacquer room

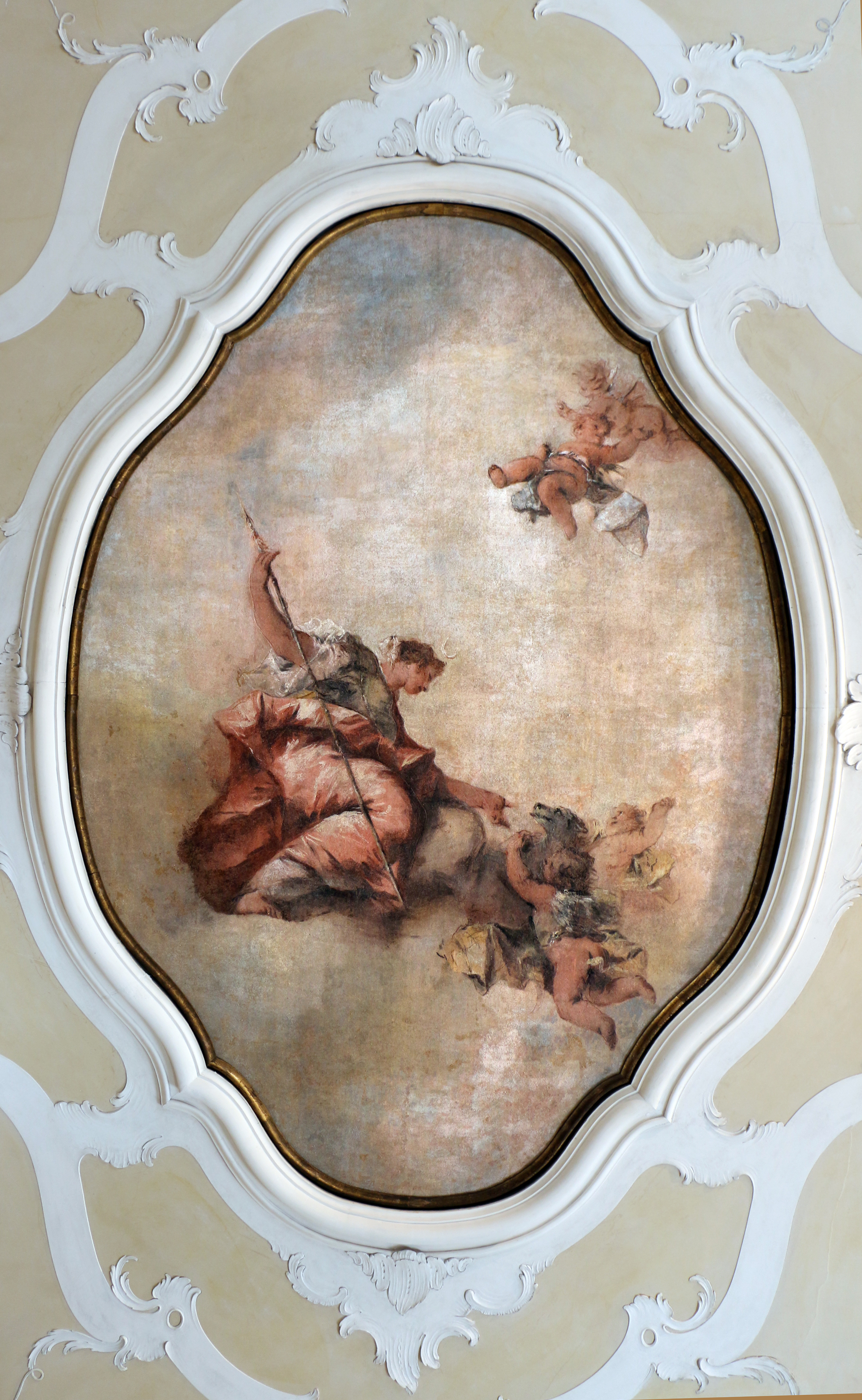
Trionfo di diana - Ceiling

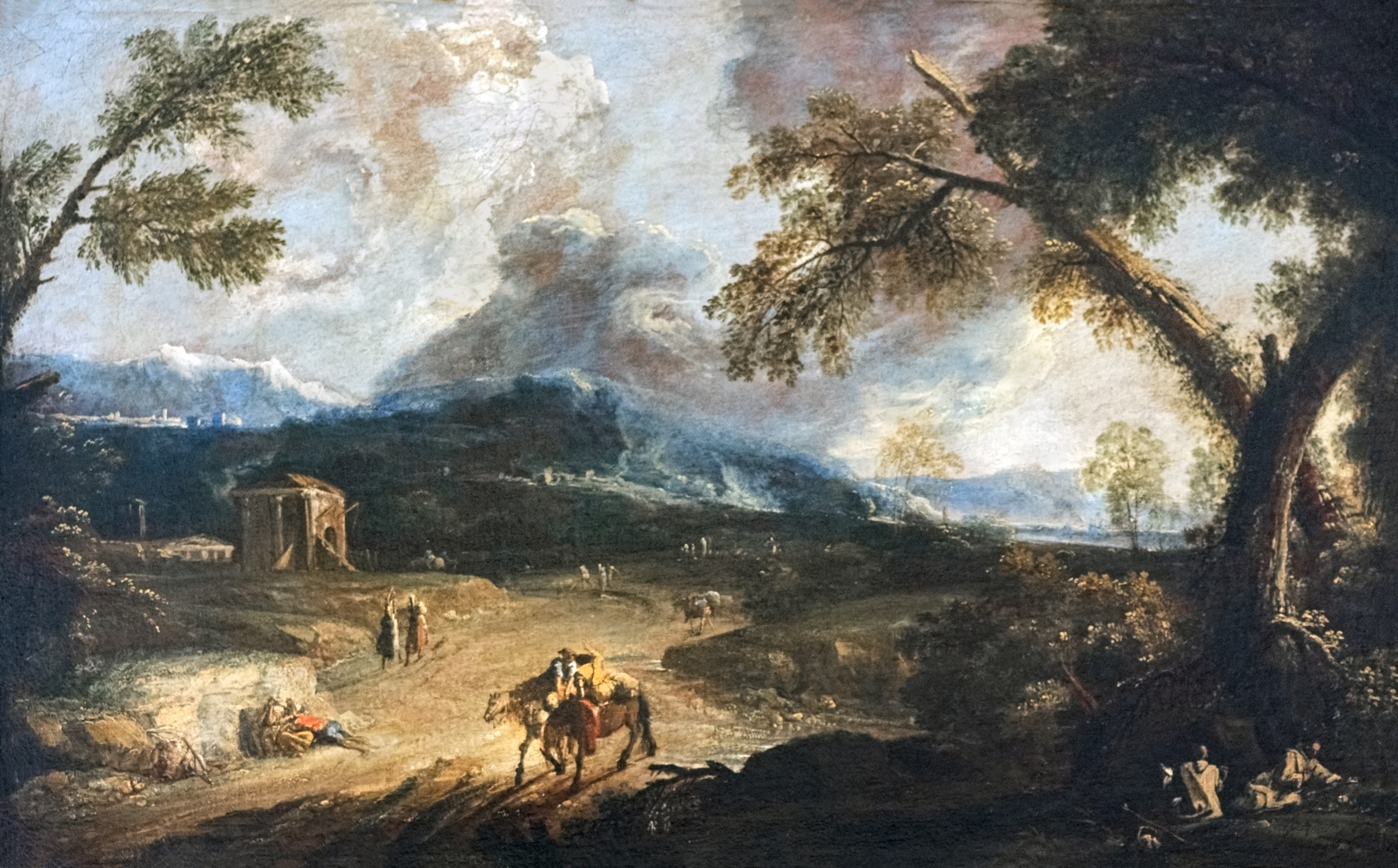
Paesaggio con monaci e viandanti by Marco Ricci

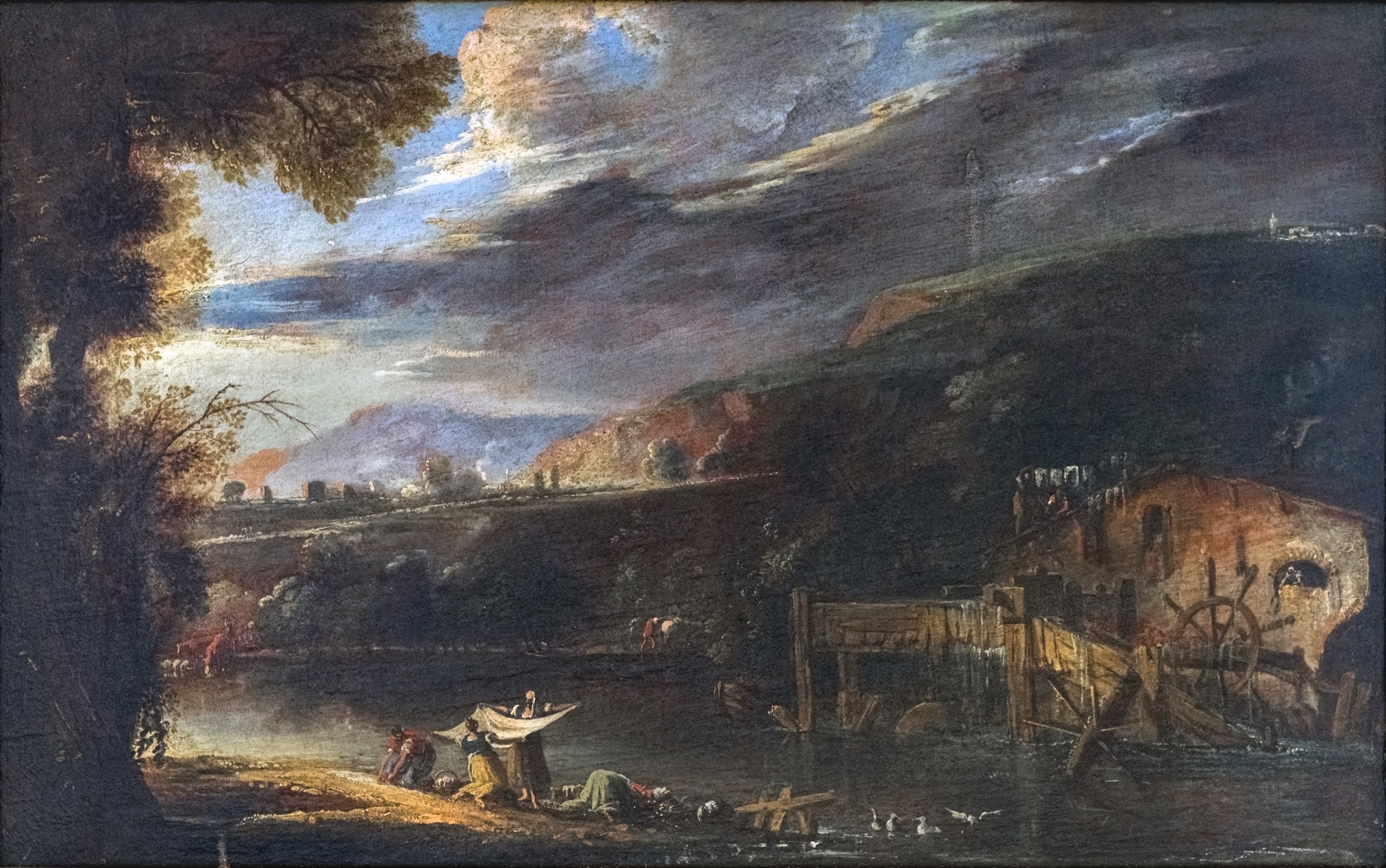
Paesaggio con mulino e lavandaie by Marco Ricci

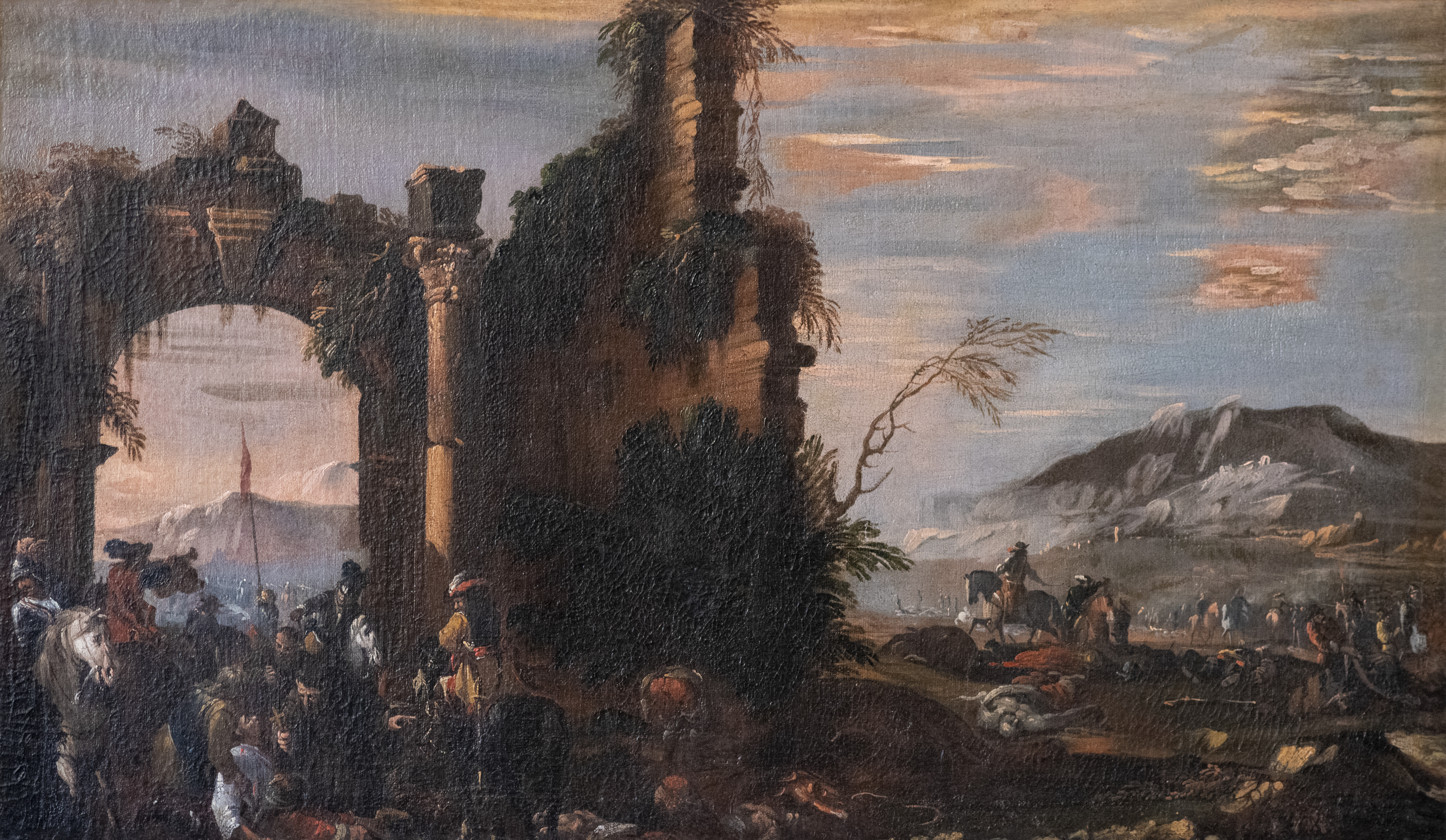
Capriccio con arco by Luca Carlevarijs

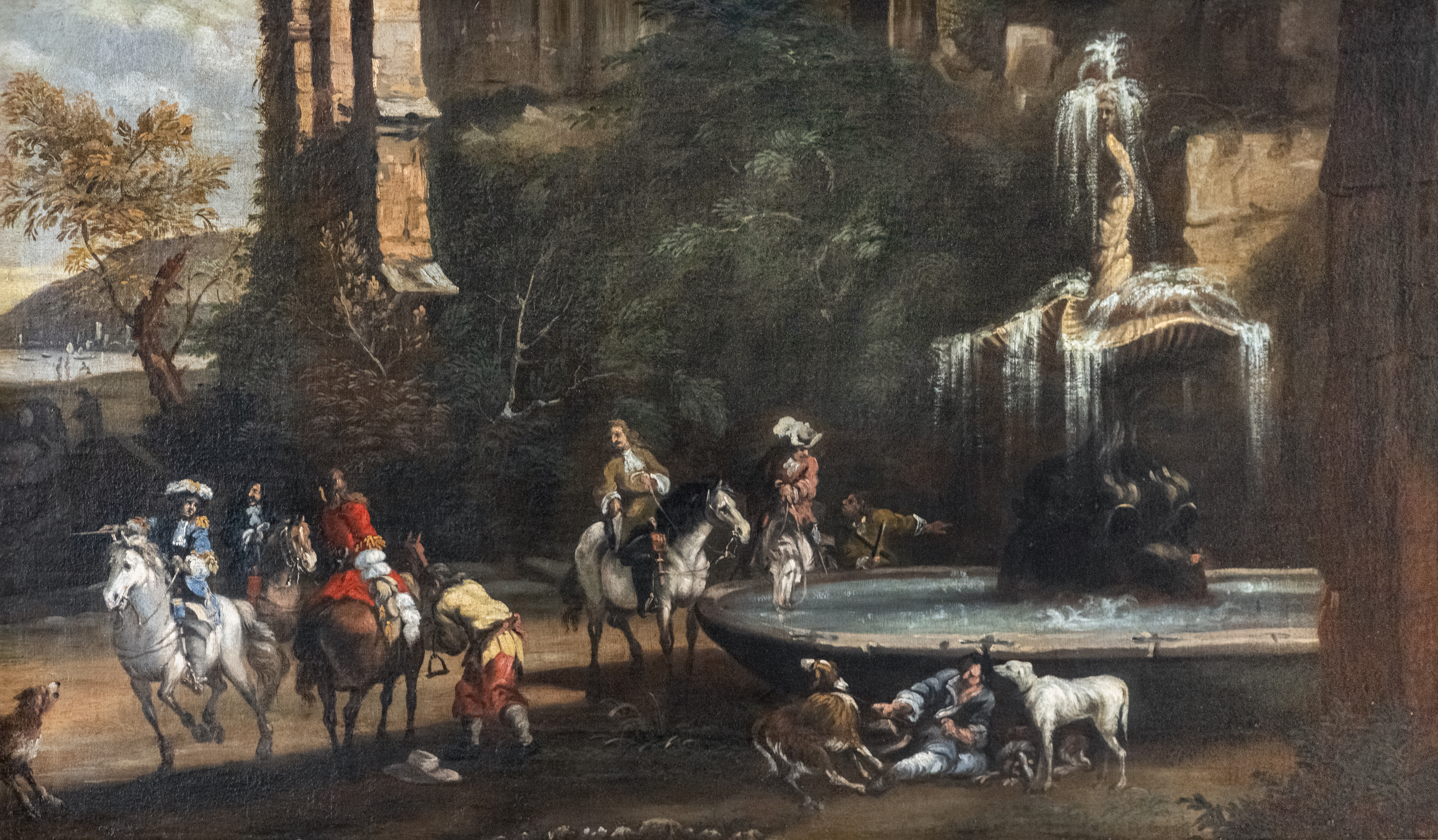
Capriccio con la fontana di Nettuno by Luca Carlevarijs

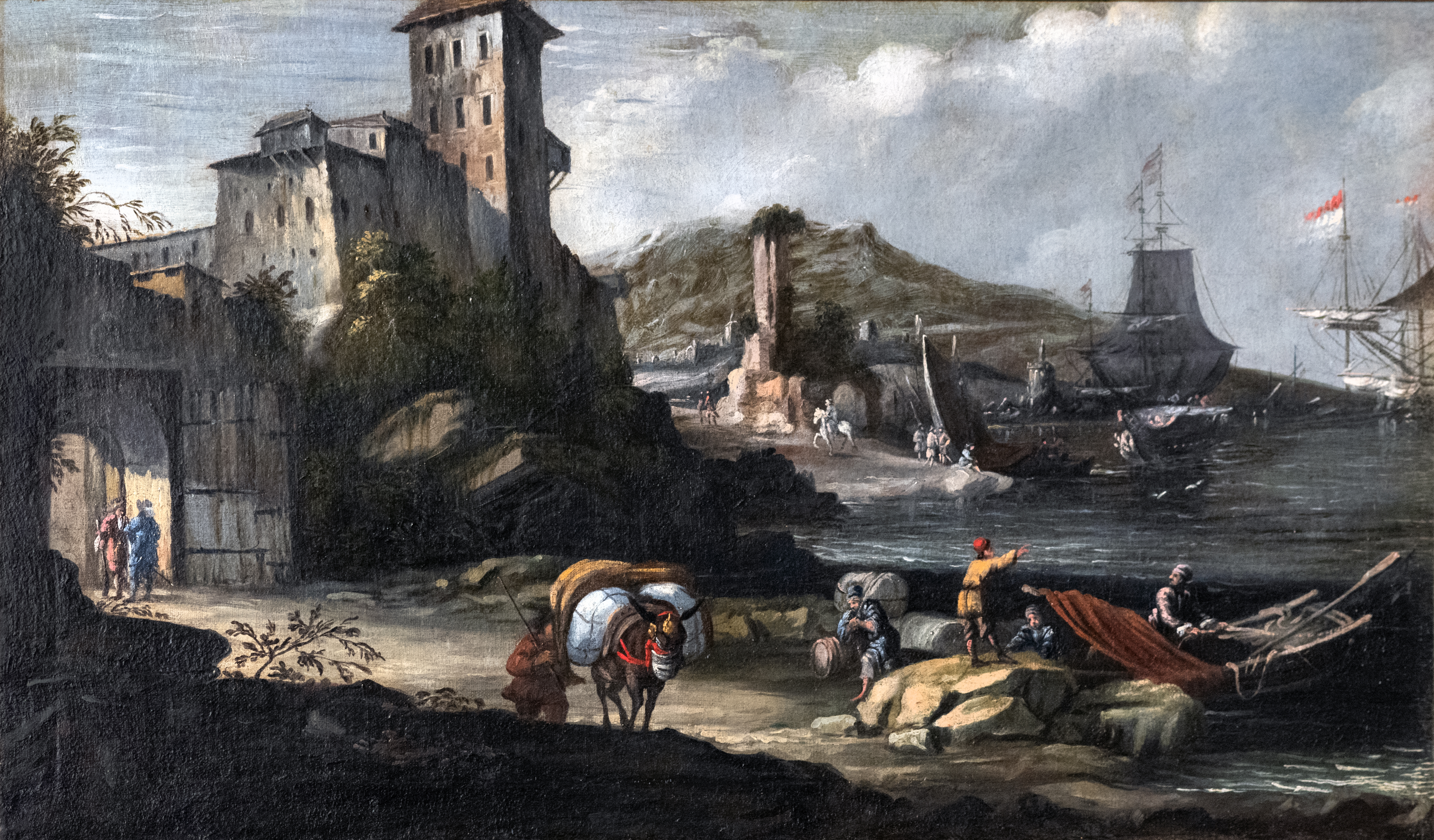
Paesaggio con marina by Johann Anton Eisman

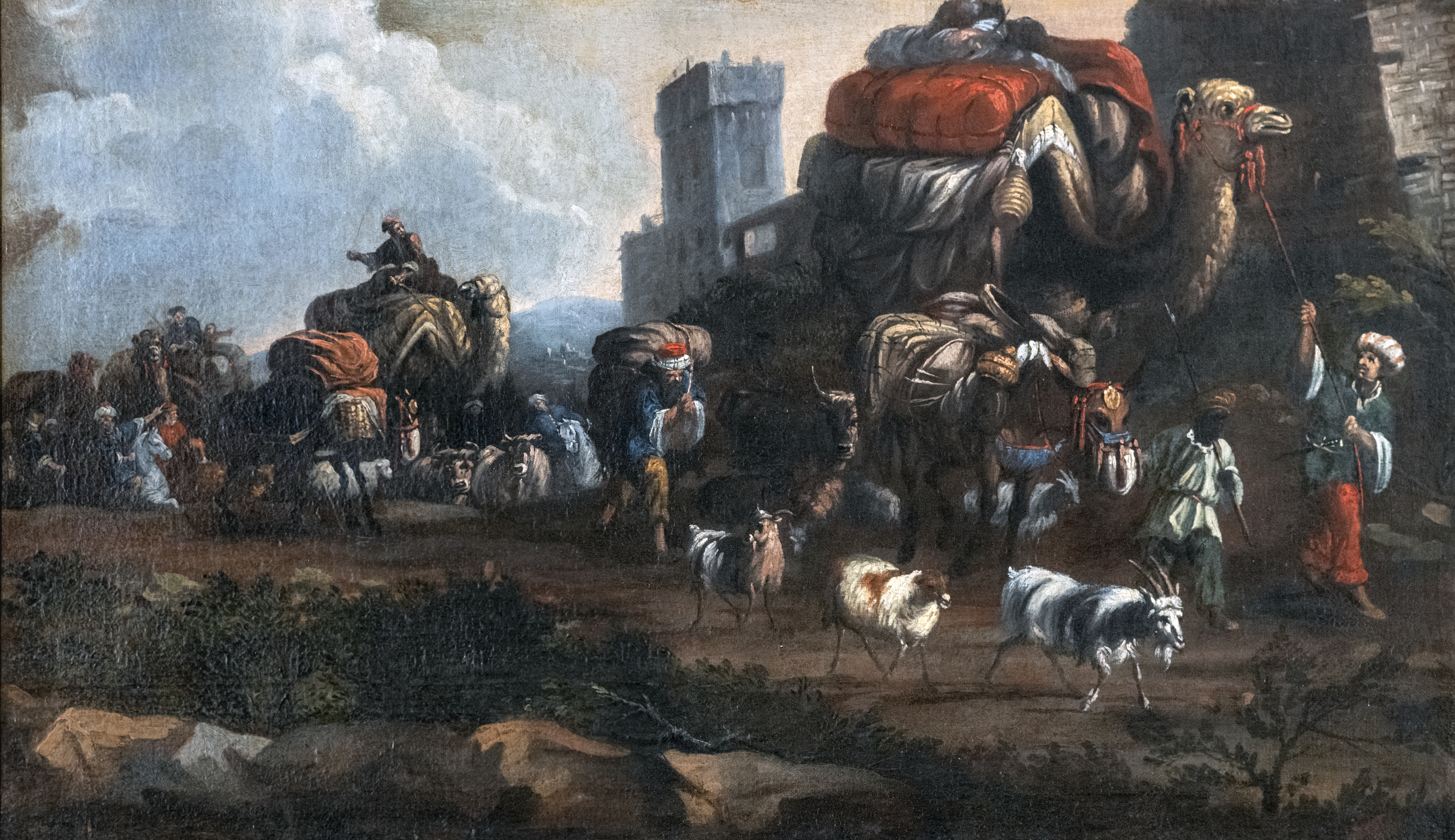
Paesaggio con Carovana by Johann Anton Eisman

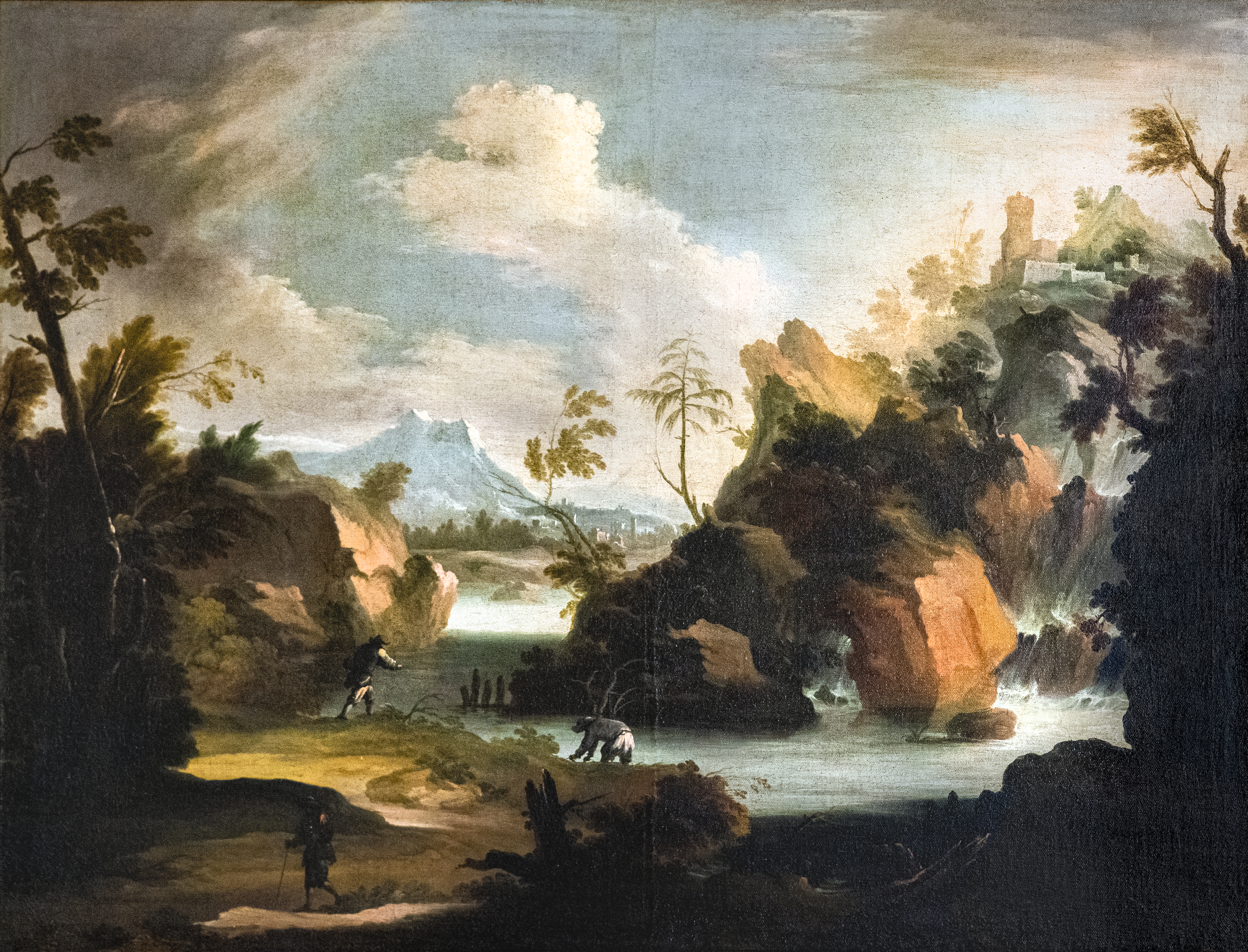
Paesaggio con cascata by Jacob de Heusch

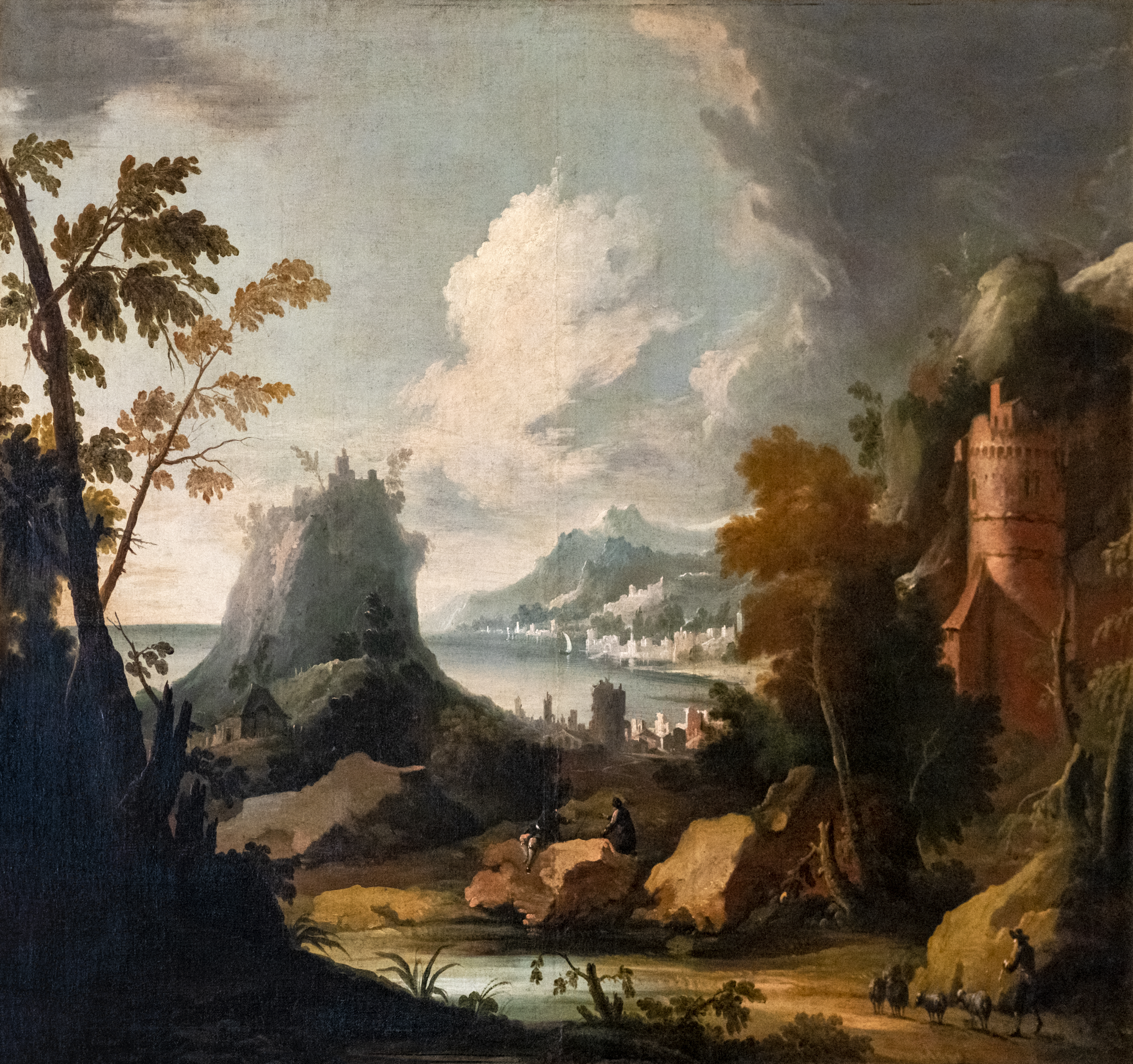
Paesaggio con marina by Jacob de Heusch

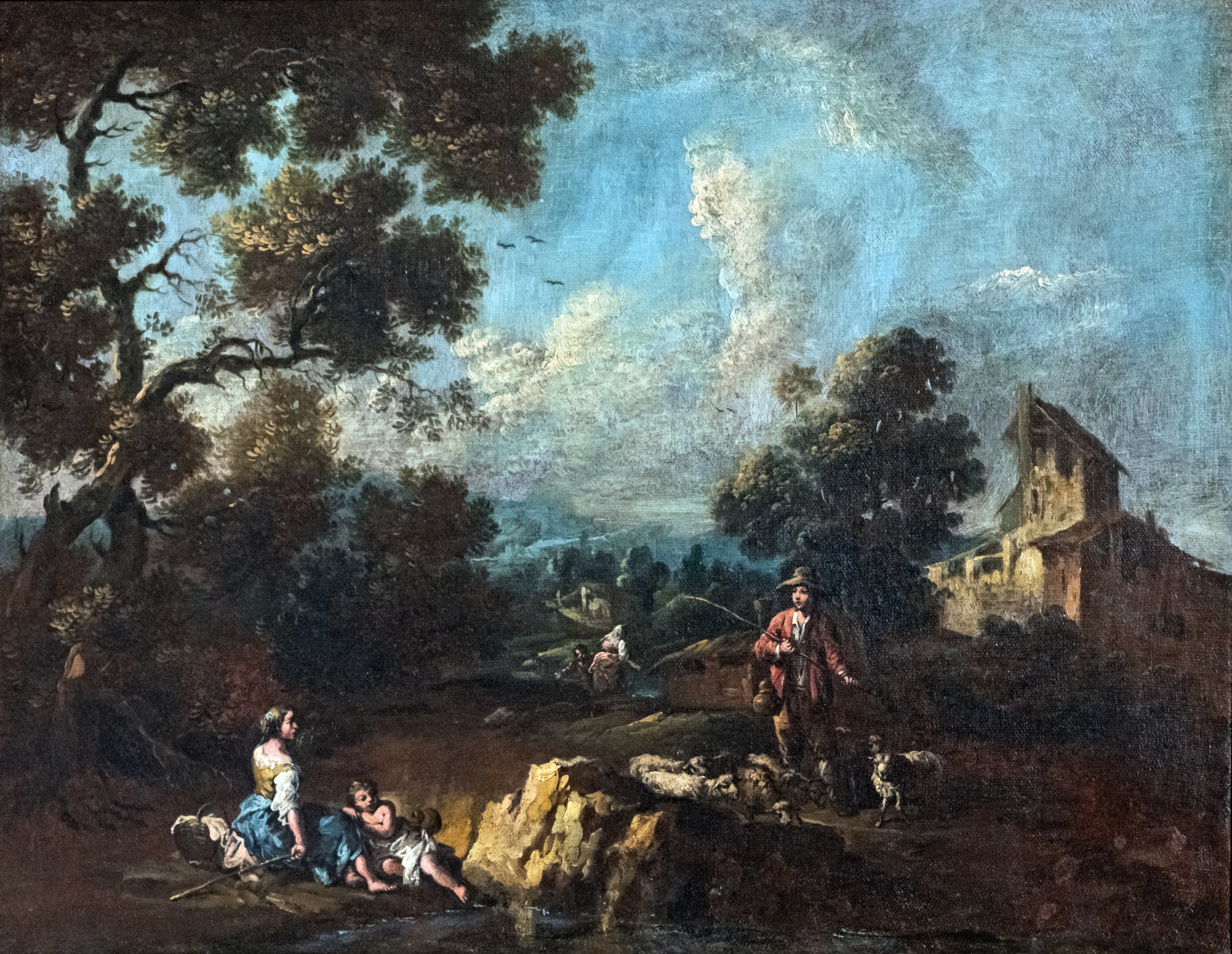
Paesaggio con pastore by Giuseppe Zais

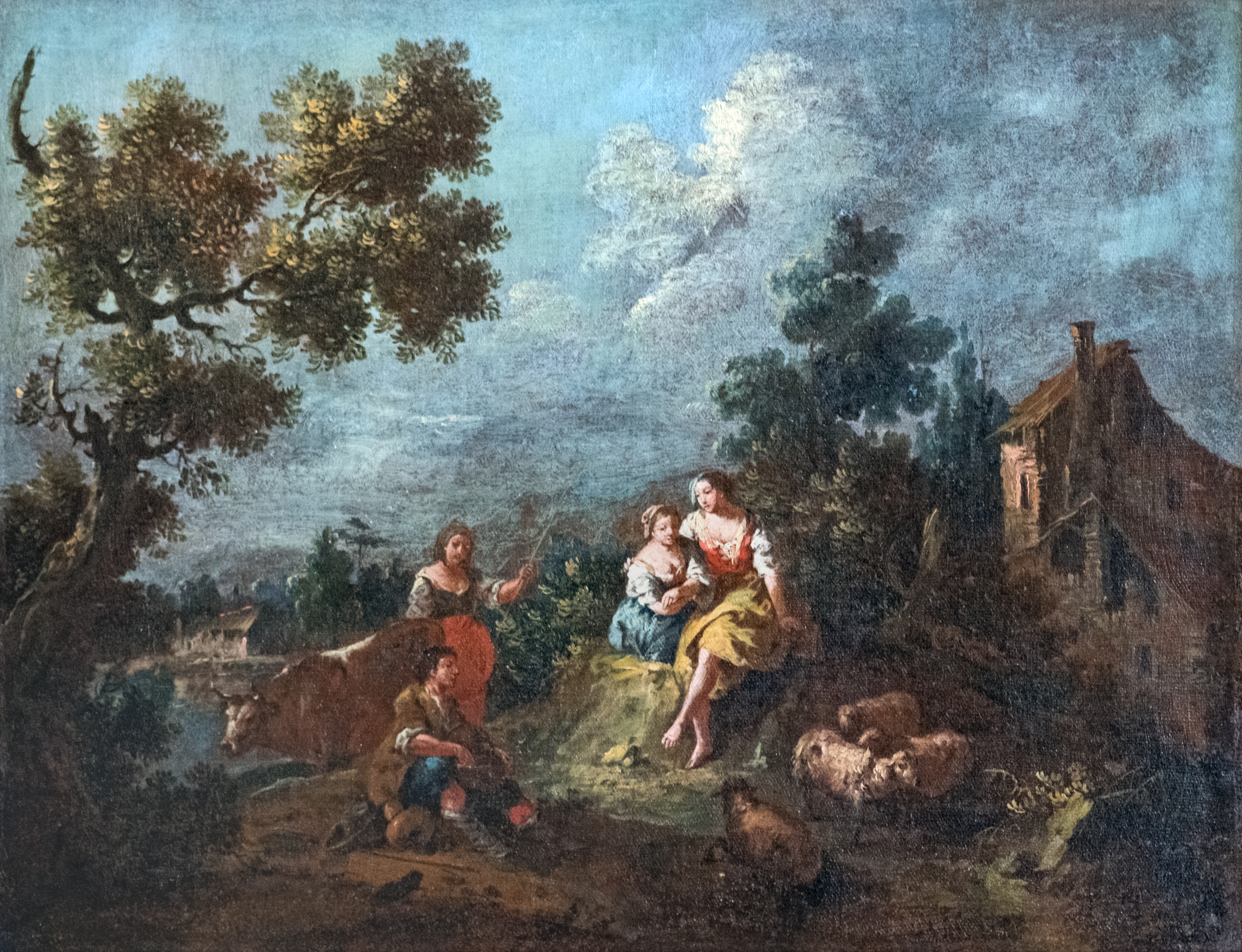
Paesaggio by Giuseppe Zais

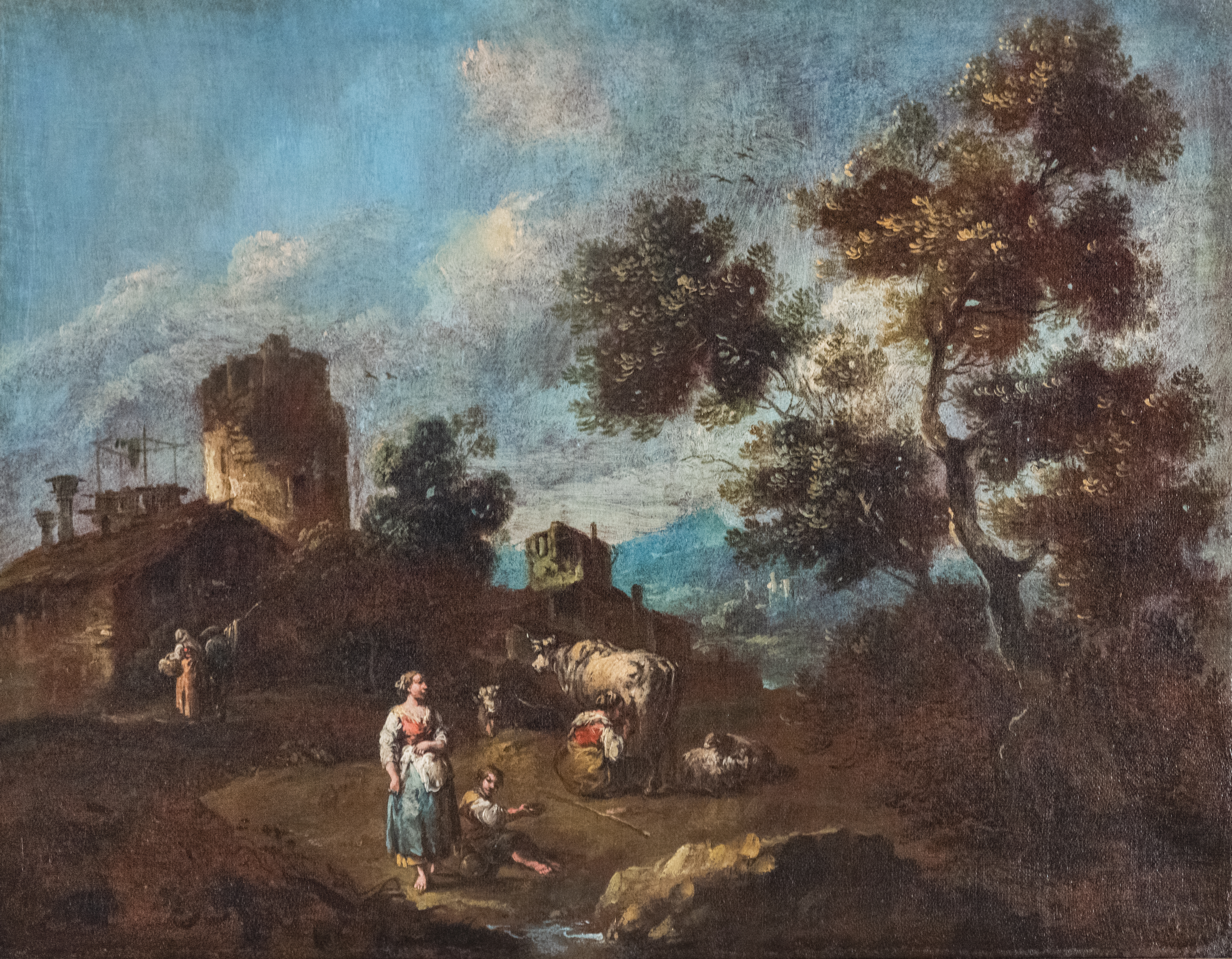
Paesaggio con la mungitura by Giuseppe Zais

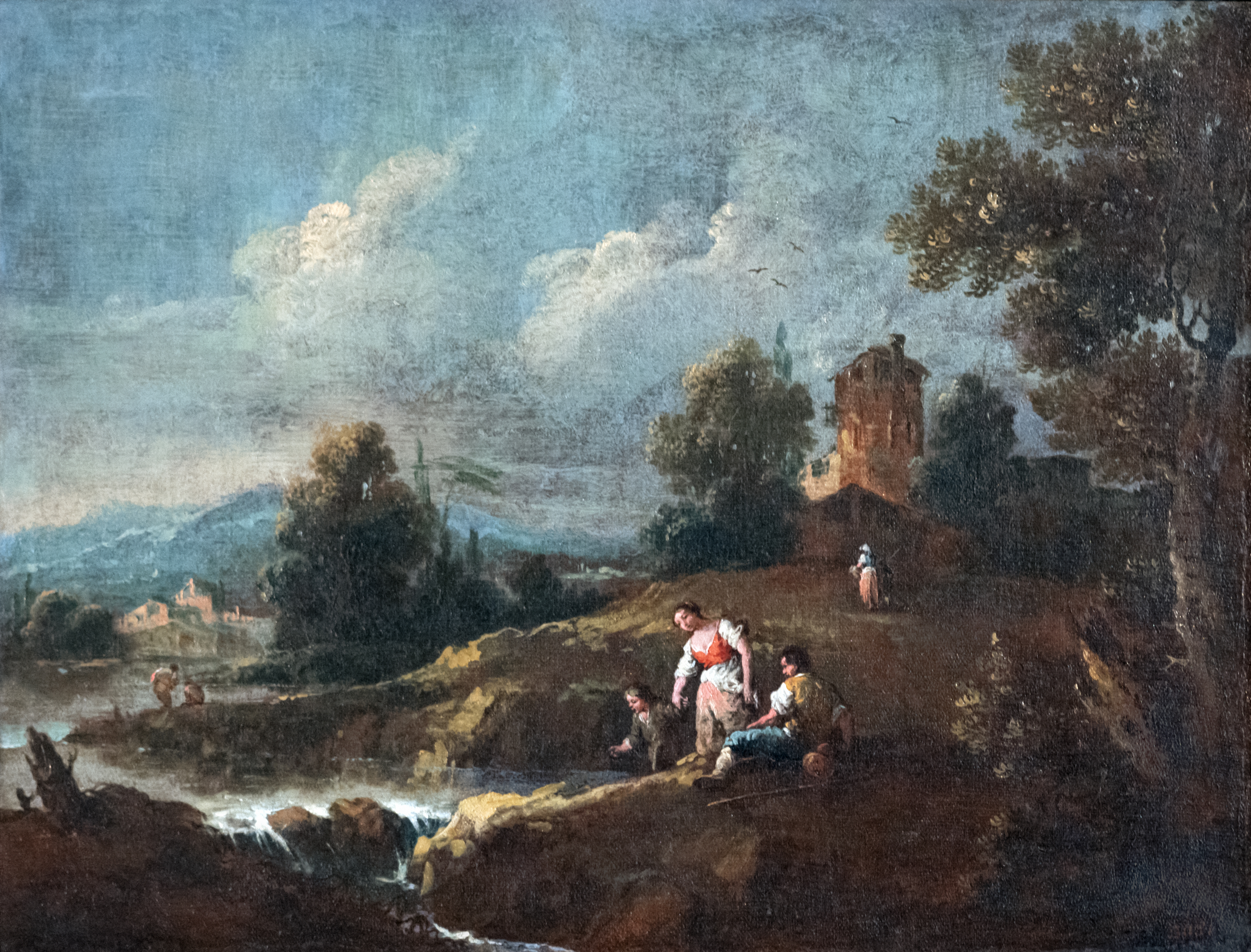
Paesaggio con riposo al torrente by Giuseppe Zais

== Third Floor and mezzanine: Martini Collection and Mestrovich Collection ==
The third and top floor (second floor in U.S. usage) has a recreation of an 18th-century Venetian pharmacy, which was reconstituted in 1936 with original materials from a pharmacy of the period. It also includes an art gallery devoted to the collection of 264 paintings of collector Egidio Martini, including works from the 15th to the end of the 19th century by the major Venetian masters. It occupies nearly the entire third floor. It includes important works by Bernardo Strozzi, Francesco Maffei, Pietro Vecchia, the Tiepolos father and son, Giambattista Piazzetta, Gaspare Diziani, and other major Venetian masters.

The mezzanine, reached by the stairway to the ground floor, contains another gallery displaying the Mestrovich Collection, by Ferrucio Mestrovich, whose family lived in Dalmatia, and who emigrated to Venice in 1945. He donated his collection to the museum in December 2001 and October 2009. It consists of about thirty paintings from the 15th to 20th century. It includes major works by Jacopo Tintoretto and Bonifazio Veronese, among others.

Other major works that can be seen on the top floor include the historical The Death of Darius by Giovanni Battista Piazzetta; and a collection of three portraits by Pietro Bellotti. Also represented in the museum collection, with a pastel, is the Venetian artist Maria Molin.

== See also ==
- List of buildings and structures in Venice

== Bibliography ==
- Pedrocco, Filippo (2012), Ca' Rezzonico: Musée de l'art vénitien du XVIII siécle, Milan: Marsilio Editori, ISBN 978-88-317-1425-9
- Ducher, Robert (1988), Caractéristique des Styles, Paris: Flammarion, ISBN 2-08-011539-1

Preceded by Ca' Pesaro	Venice landmarks Ca' Rezzonico	Succeeded by Ca' Vendramin Calergi
