= Madonna dell'Orto =

Church in Venice, Italy

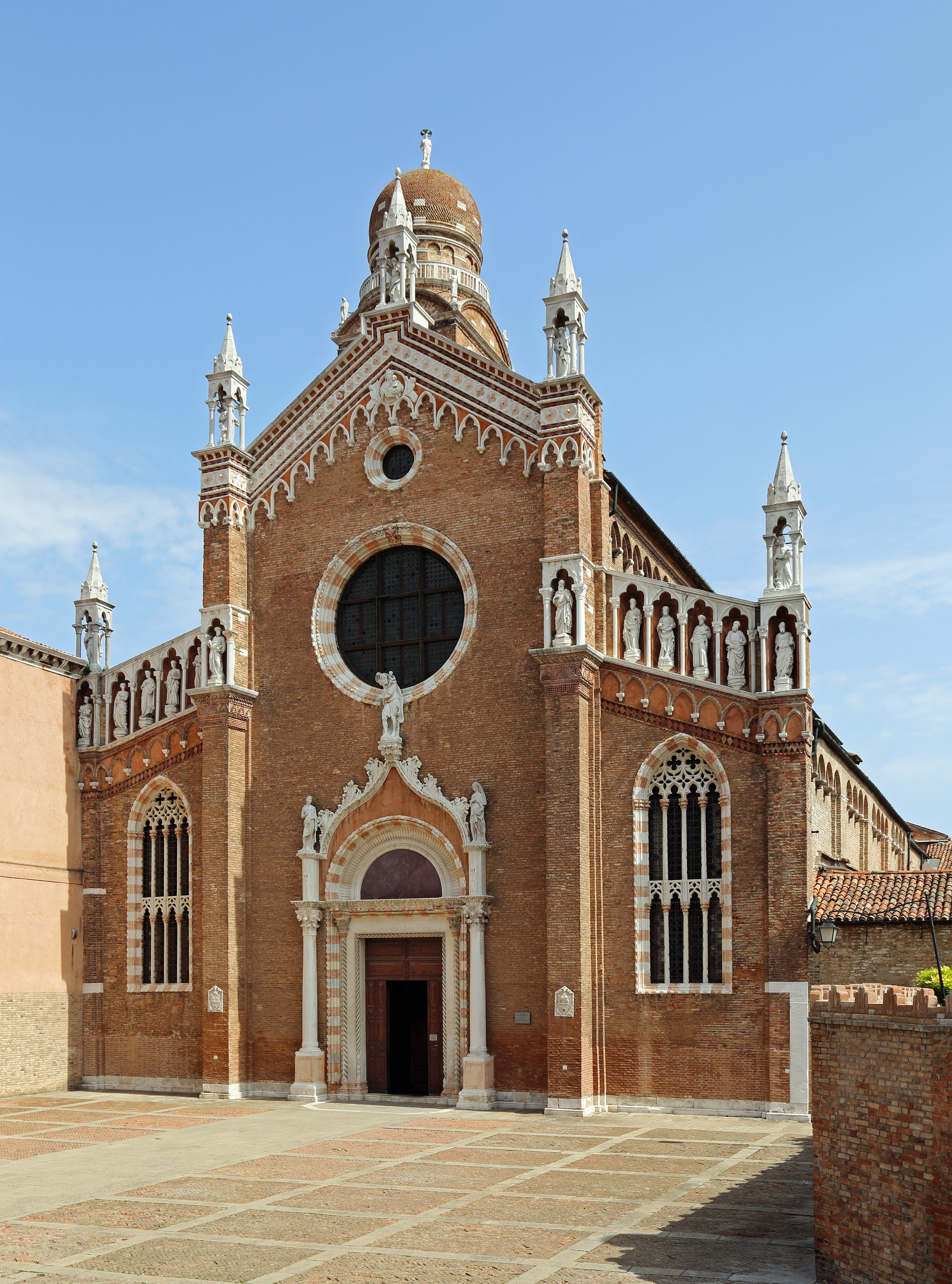
- Madonna dell'Orto
- Madonna dell'Orto
- 45°26′46.81″N 12°19′56.9″E
- Country: Italy
- Denomination: Roman Catholic

History
- Dedication: St Christopher and St Mary

Architecture
- Style: Venetian Gothic

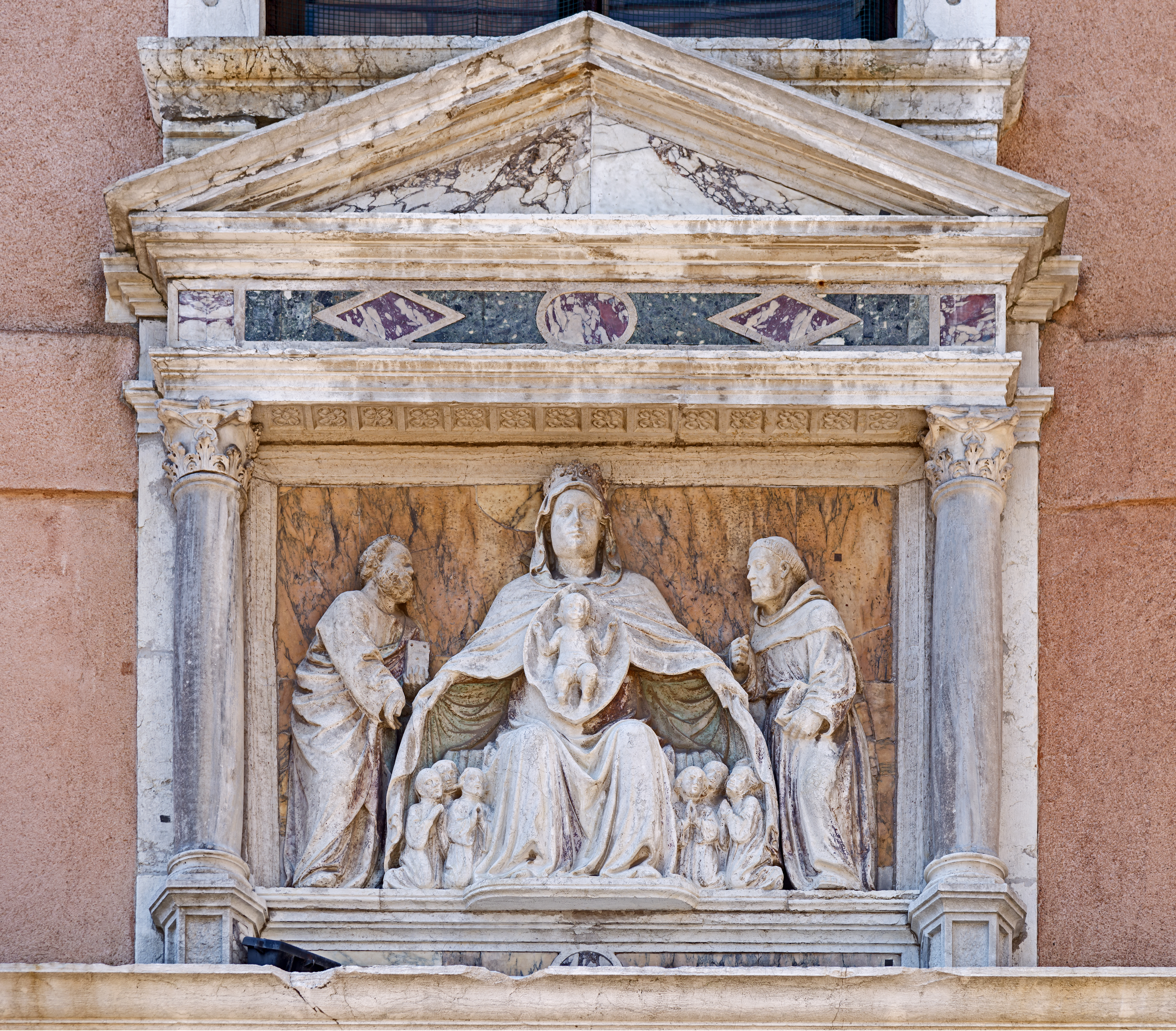
Madonna dell'Orto.

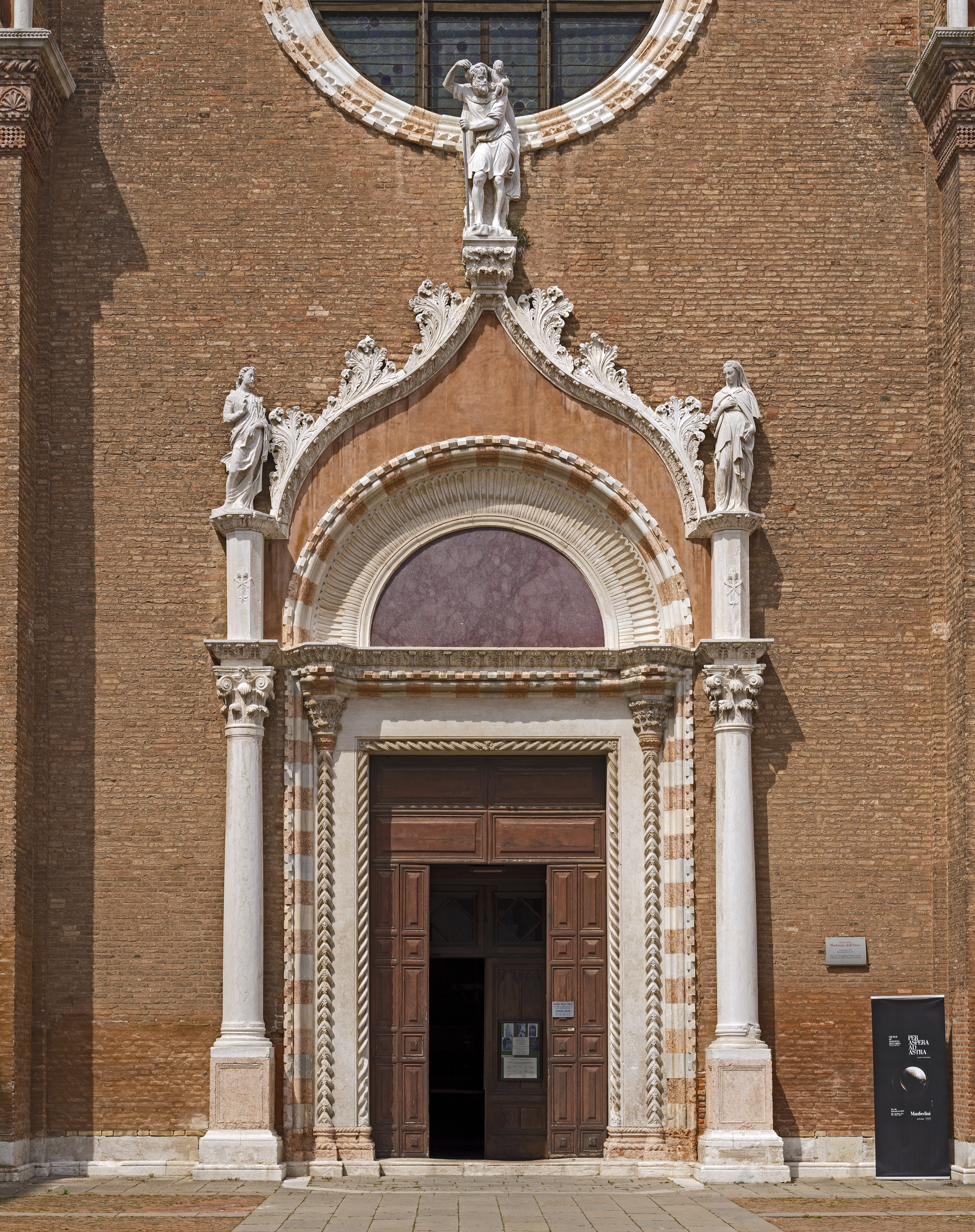
View of the portal.

The Madonna dell'Orto is a church in Venice, Italy, in the sestiere of Cannaregio. This was the home parish of Tintoretto and holds a number of his works as well as his tomb.

== History ==
The church was erected by the now-defunct religious order the "Humiliati" in the mid-14th century, under the direction of Tiberio da Parma, who is buried in the interior. It was initially dedicated to St. Christopher, patron saint of those who travel by ferry, but its popular name suggesting consecration to Holy Virgin comes from the following century, when an allegedly miraculous statue of the Madonna, commissioned for the Church of S. Maria Formosa but rejected, was brought to the Church from the nearby orchard (orto in Italian) where it had languished.

The church lay on weak foundations and in 1399 a restoration project was financed by the city's Maggior Consiglio. In 1414 it was officially named “Chiesa della Madonna dell’Orto” (Church of the Madonna in the Vegetable garden). The Humiliati were ousted in 1462 and the Madonna dell'Orto was assigned to the congregation of Canons Regular of San Giorgio in Alga. The latter order was suppressed in 1668, and the following year the Church and convent annexed were handed over to Cistercians of Lombardy. In 1787 the church came under public administration. Restoration was begun under Austrian rule in the 1840s and finished in 1869, by which time Venice had become part of the unified Kingdom of Italy.

Since 1931 the church is assigned to Saint Leonardo Murialdo's "Padri della congregazione di San Giuseppe". The Congregation operates a nearby guesthouse, the "Casa Vacanza Madonna dell'Orto Patronato Pio IX".

The church underwent extensive restoration after the flood of 1966.

== Façade ==
The façade, built in 1460–1464, has sloping sides and is in brickwork, divided in three parts by two pilasters strips. The two side sections have quadruple mullioned windows, while the central has a large rose window. The portal is surmounted by a pointed arch with white stone decorations portraying, on the summit, St. Christopher, the Madonna and the Archangel Gabriel by Nicolò di Giovanni Fiorentino and Antonio Rizzo. Under is a tympanum, in porphyry, supported by circular pilaster strips. The whole is included into a porch with Corinthian columns.

The upper central section is decorated by small arches and bas-reliefs with geometrical motifs. The upper sides have instead twelve niches each, containing statues of the Apostles. Five other Gothic niches are in the central section, with 18th-century statues representing Prudence, Charity, Faith, Hope and Temperance.

== Interior ==
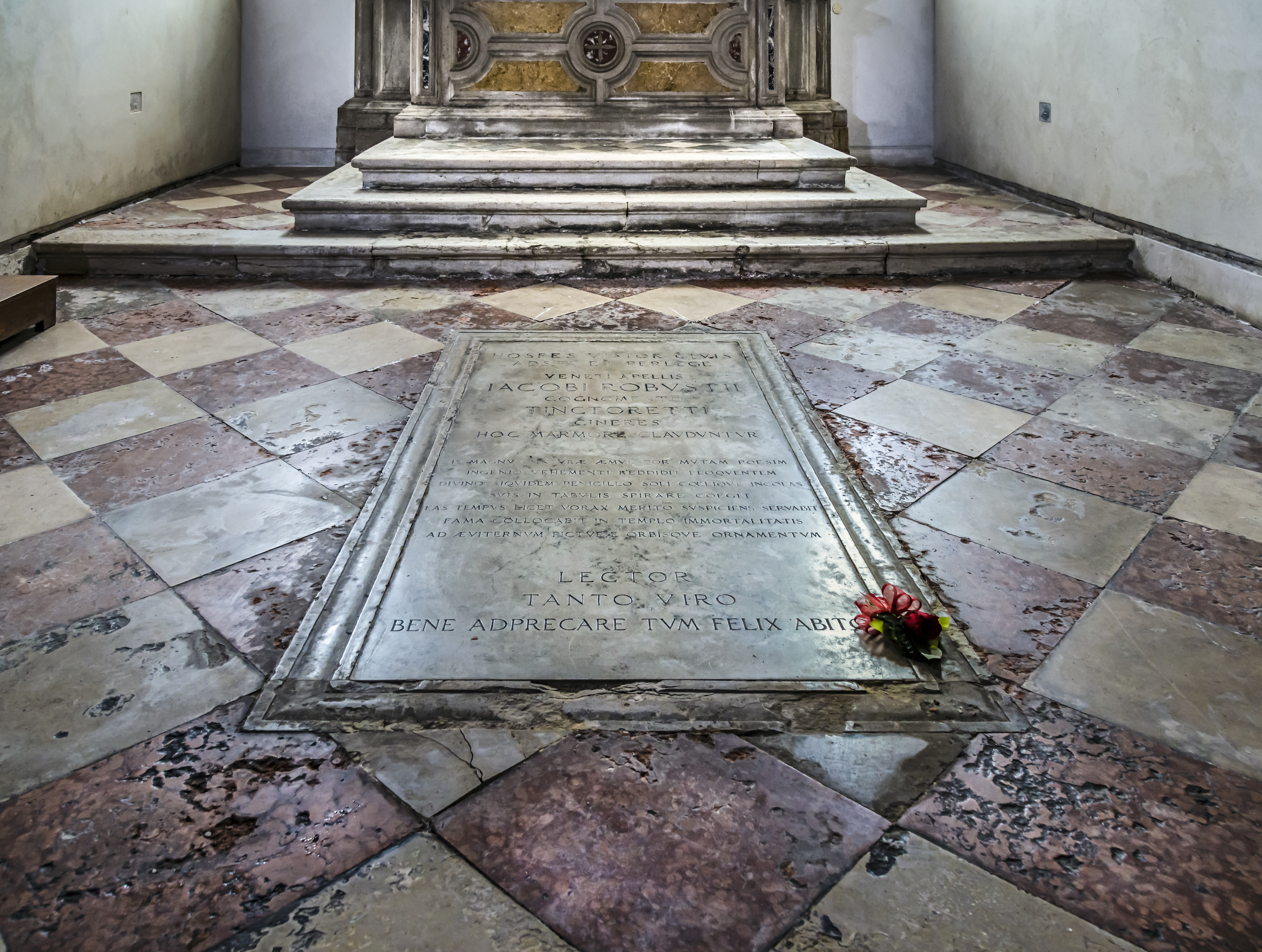
Tintoretto's tomb

The interior has a nave and two aisles, with double-framed pointed arches supported by Greek marble columns. The transept is absent, while in the rear is a pentagonal apse decorated by paintings by Jacopo Robusti, known as Tintoretto. The altarpiece over the main altar is an Annunciation by Palma Vecchio.

In the apse, either side of the main altar are Tintoretto's Adoration of the Golden Calf, and the Last Judgement. In the upper story of the apse, behind the altar) are the Four Cardinal Virtues, all from 1562 to 1564. This was his parish church and he is buried in the apsidal chapel on the right, along with two of his children.

=== Sacristy ===
- Canvas with Madonna with Child and Saints attributed to school of Paris Bourdon

=== Choir ===
- The Last Judgement (1563, right), Tintoretto
- St. Peter's Vision of the Cross (1550–1553) Left, Tintoretto.
- Above: Cardinal virtues: Justice and Temperance, half-dome of apse: Decollation of St Paul (1550–1553), right side of apse, Tintoretto
- Above: Cardinal virtues: Prudence and Strength, Tintoretto
- Annunciation (1590), Jacopo Palma il Giovane, from church of Santa Maria Nuova of Vicenza
- Above: Faith, Pietro Ricchi
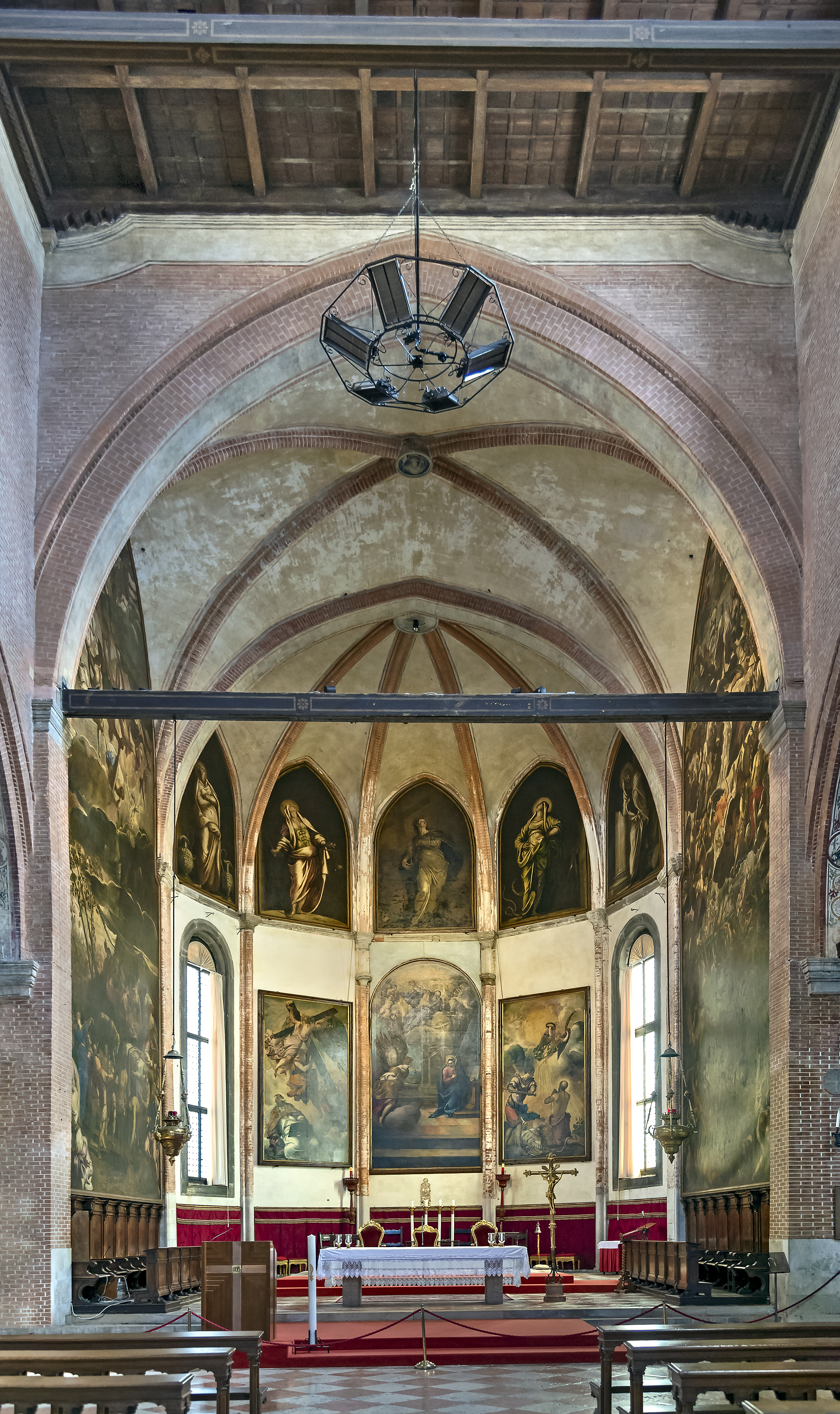
Choir

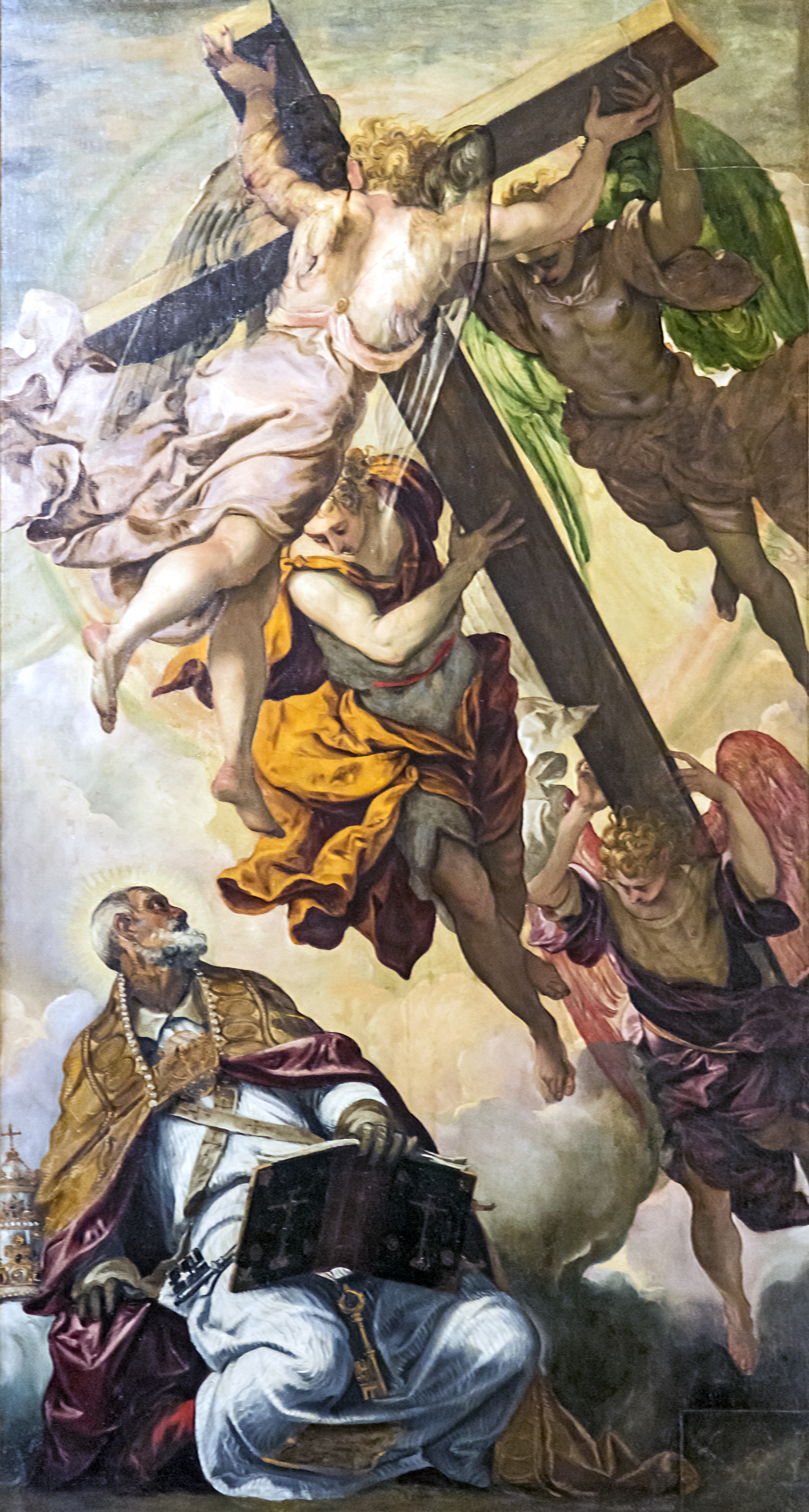
St. Peter's Vision of the Cross by Tintoretto

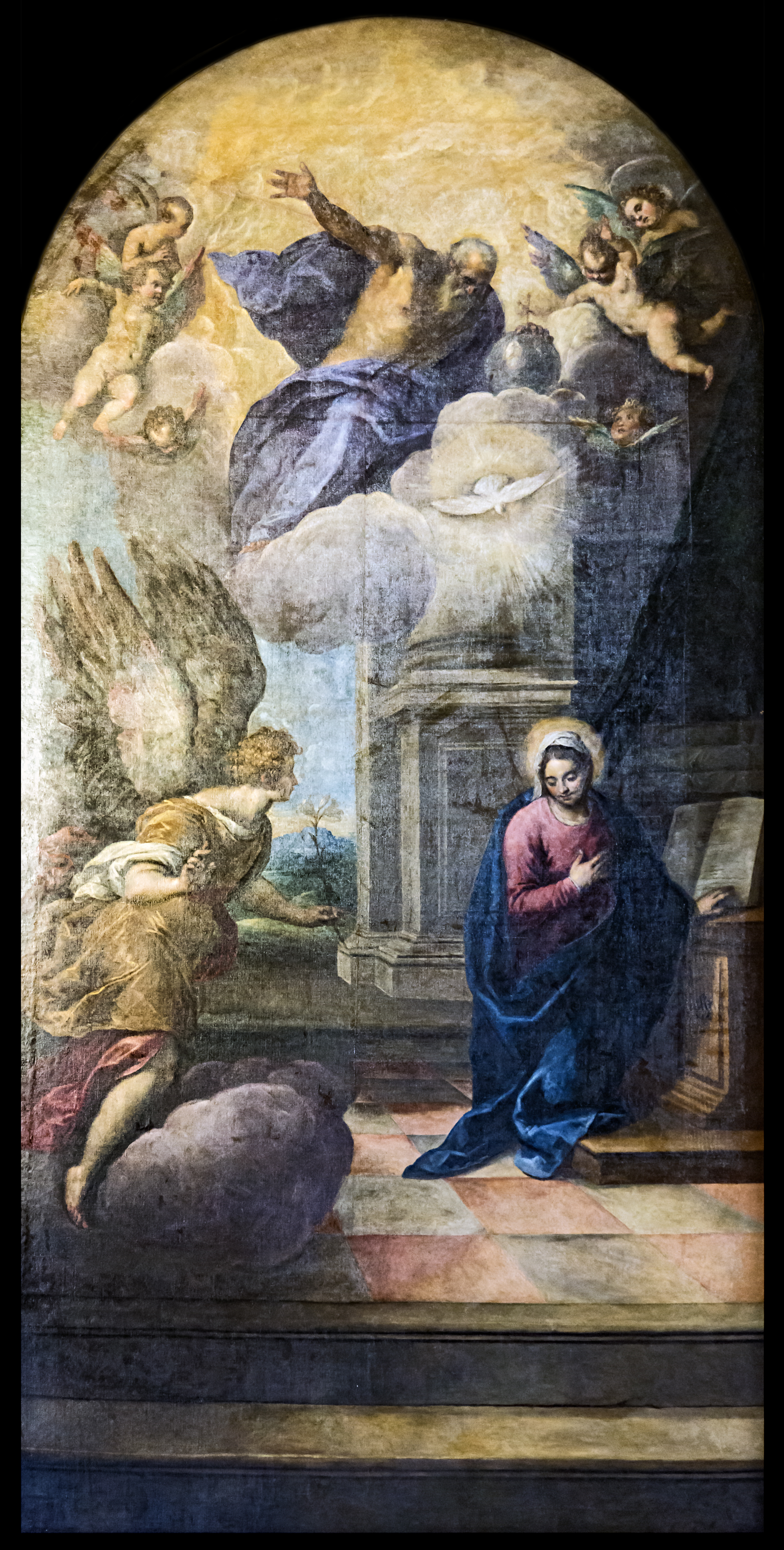
Annunciation (1590), Jacopo Palma il Giovane

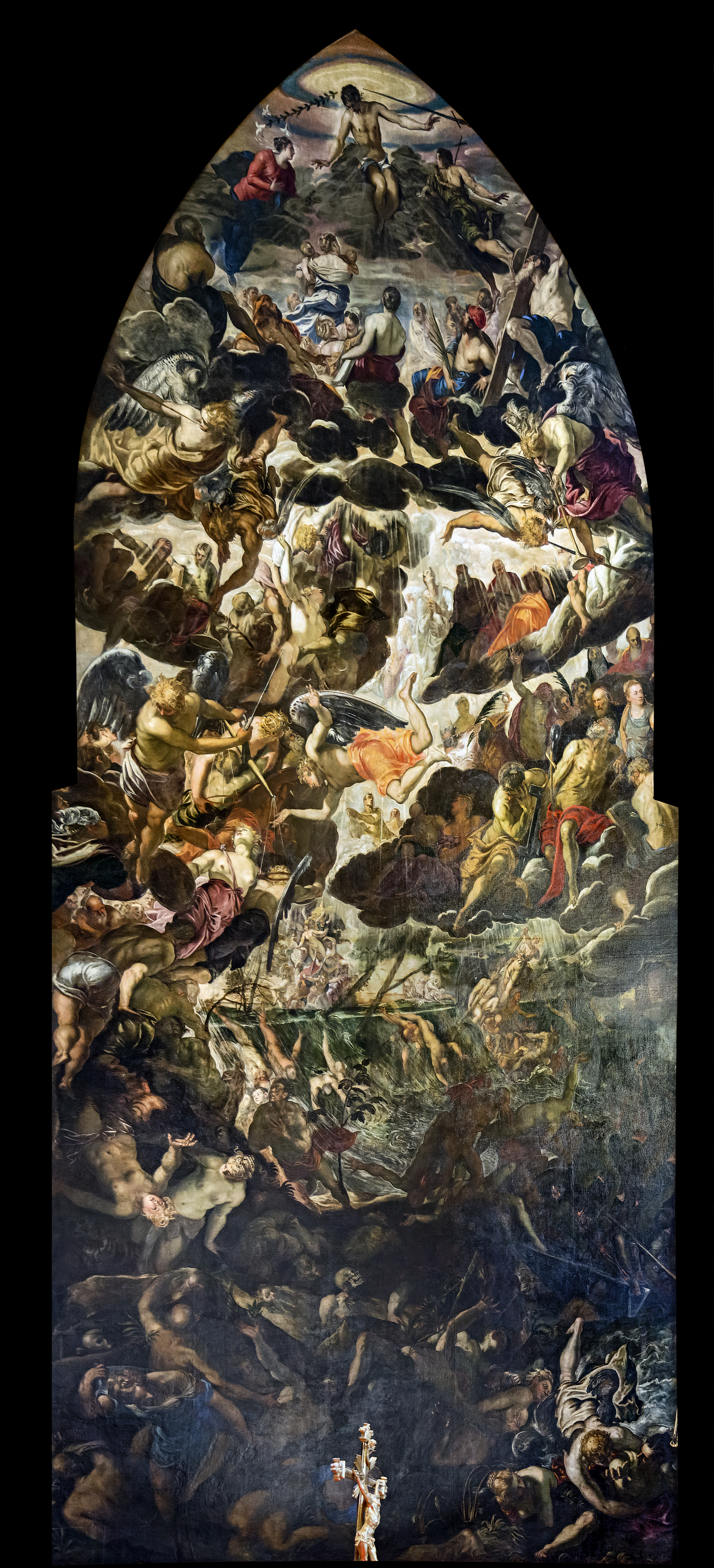
The Last Judgment Tintoretto

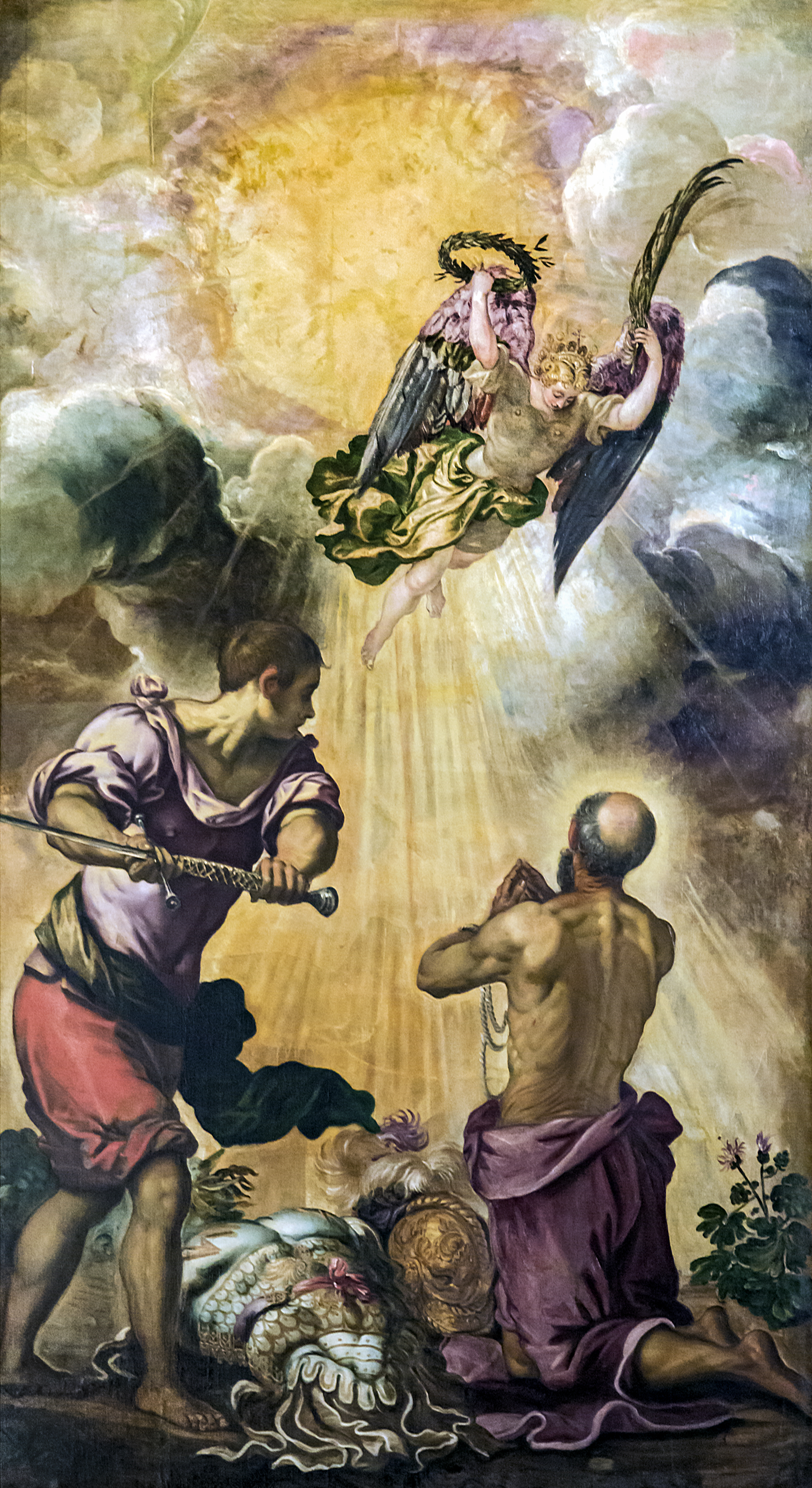
The beheading of St. Paul by Tintoretto

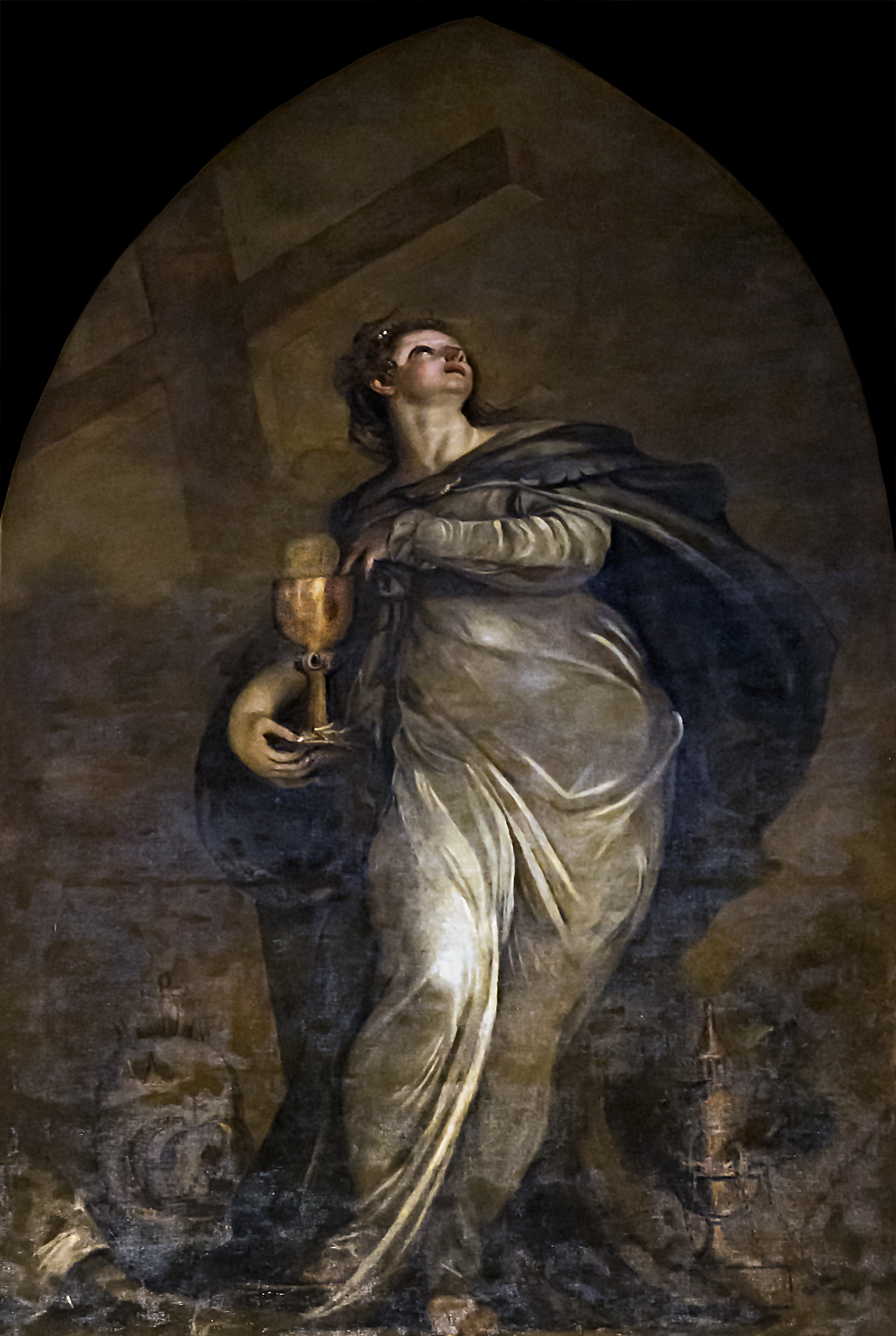
The faith by Pietro Ricchi

=== Right Nave ===
The first chapel on the right contains an altarpiece of St John Baptist with Saints Peter, Mark, Jerome, and Paul, by Cima da Conegliano. The painting was commissioned by the Saraceno dal Zio family, who were wealthy spice merchants.

- Sculpture of Madonna with Child, attributed to Antonio Rizzo
- St Christopher Martyr, copy of original by Cima da Conegliano
- Altar of Immaculate conception: built in 1593 to accommodate miraculous statue now in Cappella San Mauro
- Monument to Gerolamo Cavazza by Giuseppe Sardi (1624–1699)
- Martyrdom of St Lorenzo by Daniel van den Dyck.
- Presentation of Virgin at Temple (1550–1553), Tintoretto.
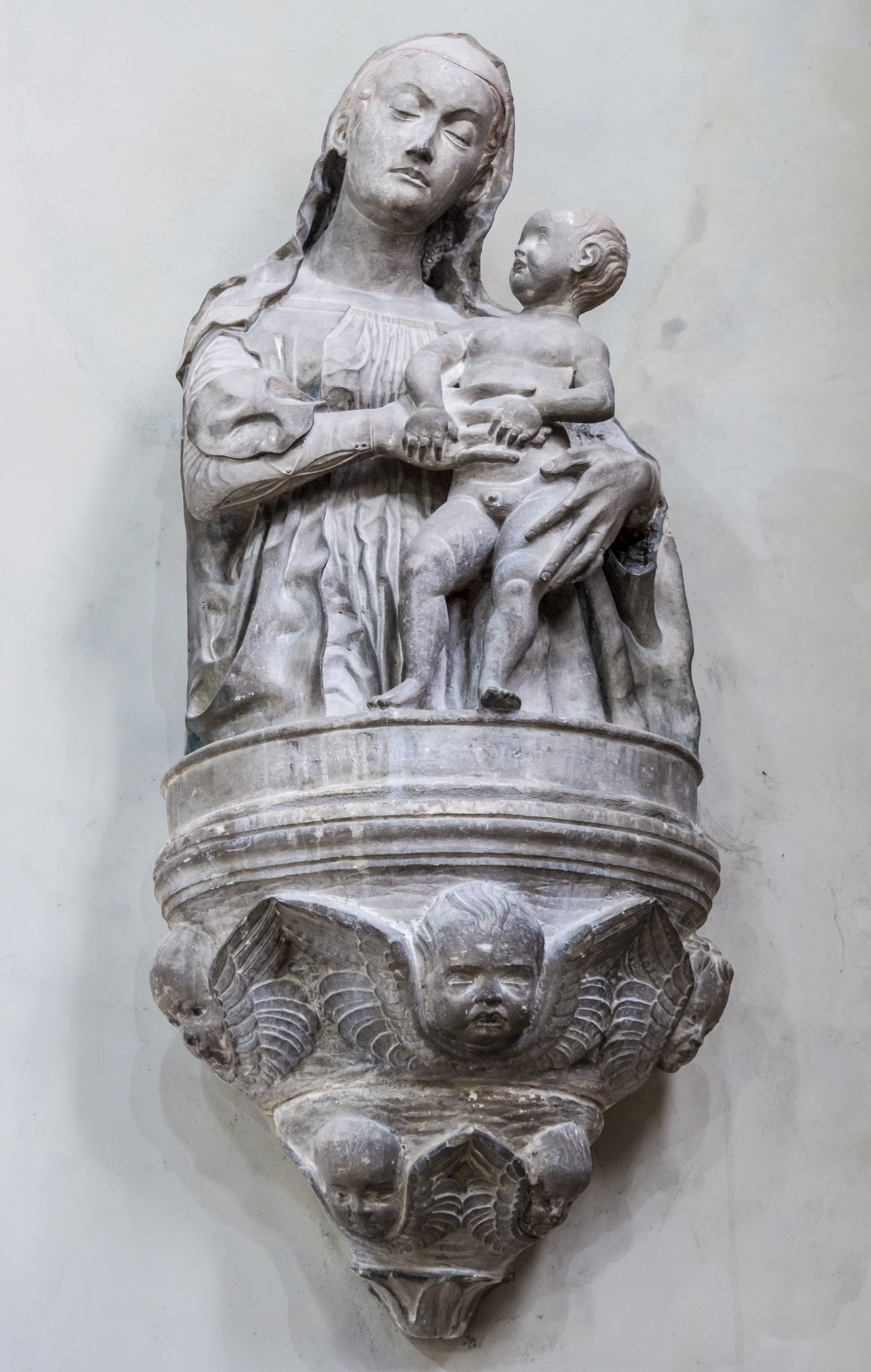
Madonna with Child, by Antonio Rizzo

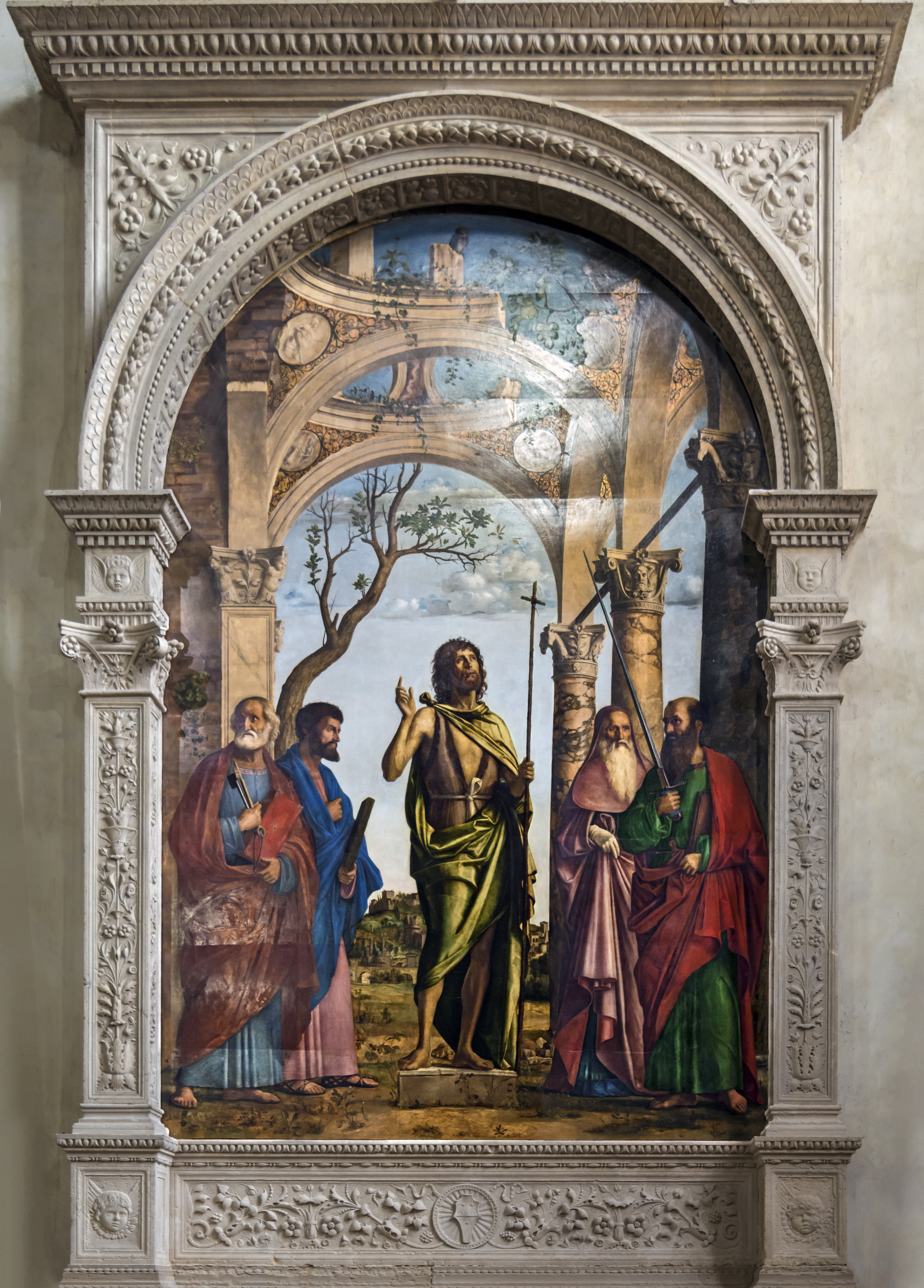
St John Baptist with Saints Peter, Mark, Jerome, and Paul

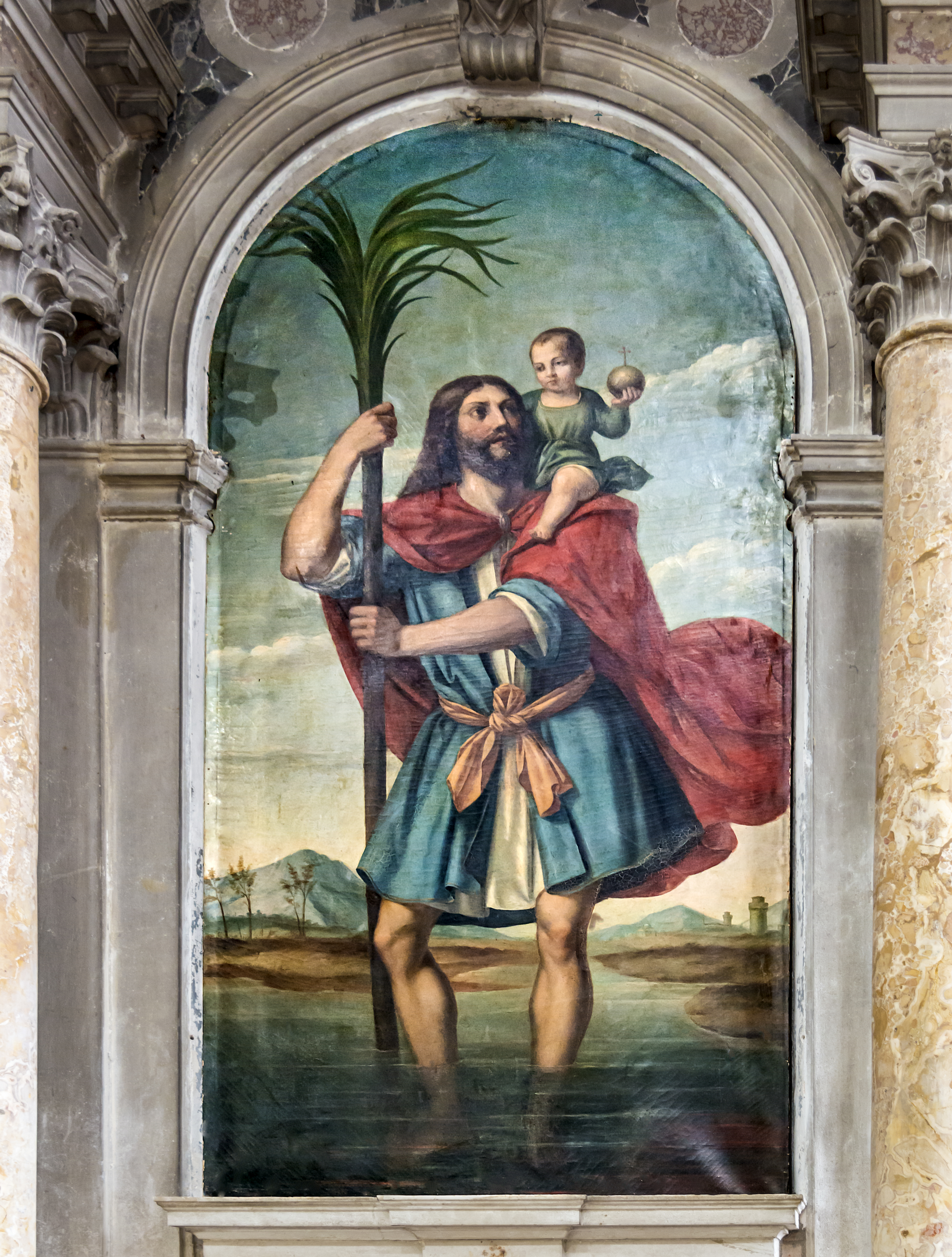
Altarpiece of St Christopher

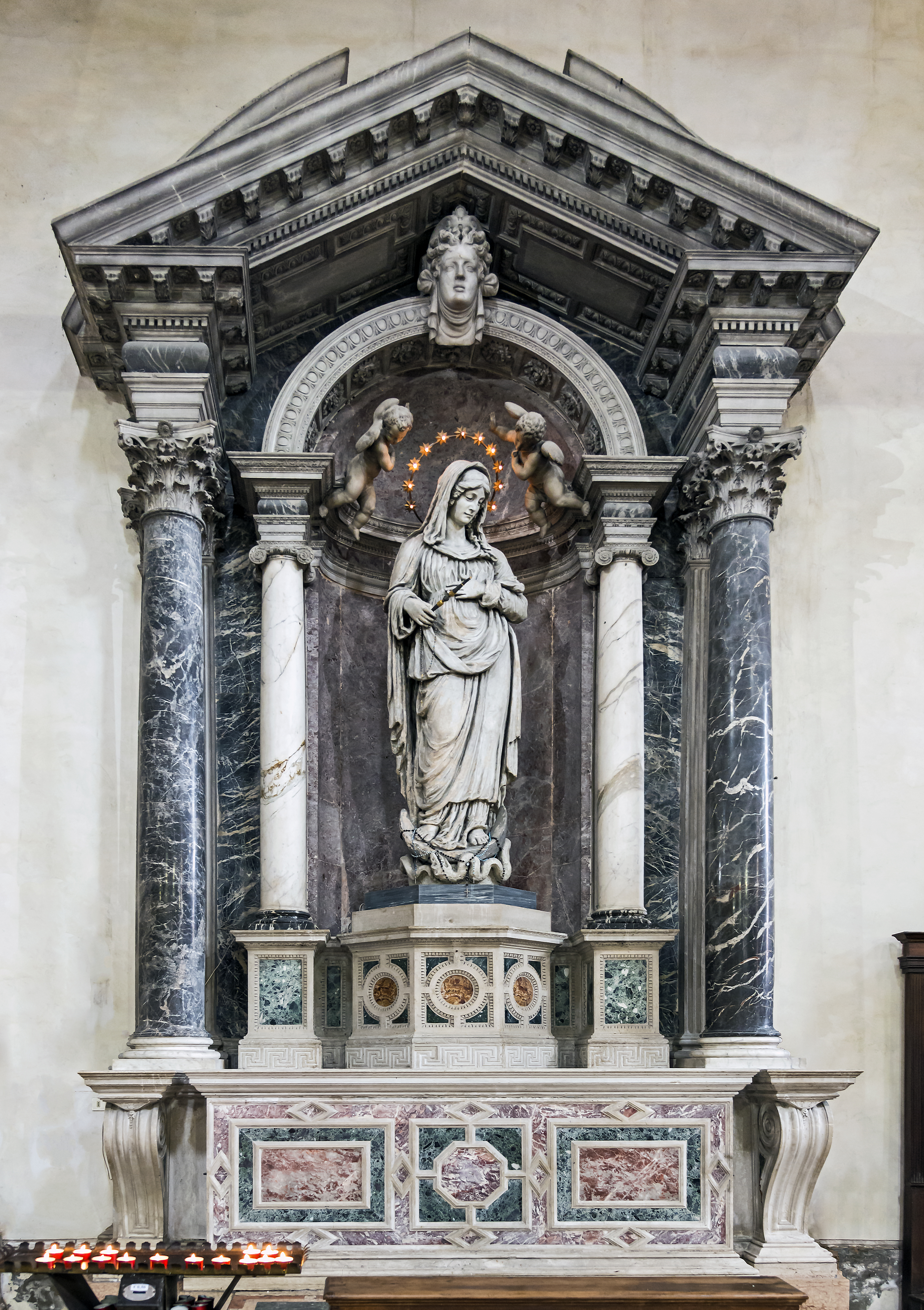
Altar of Immaculate conception

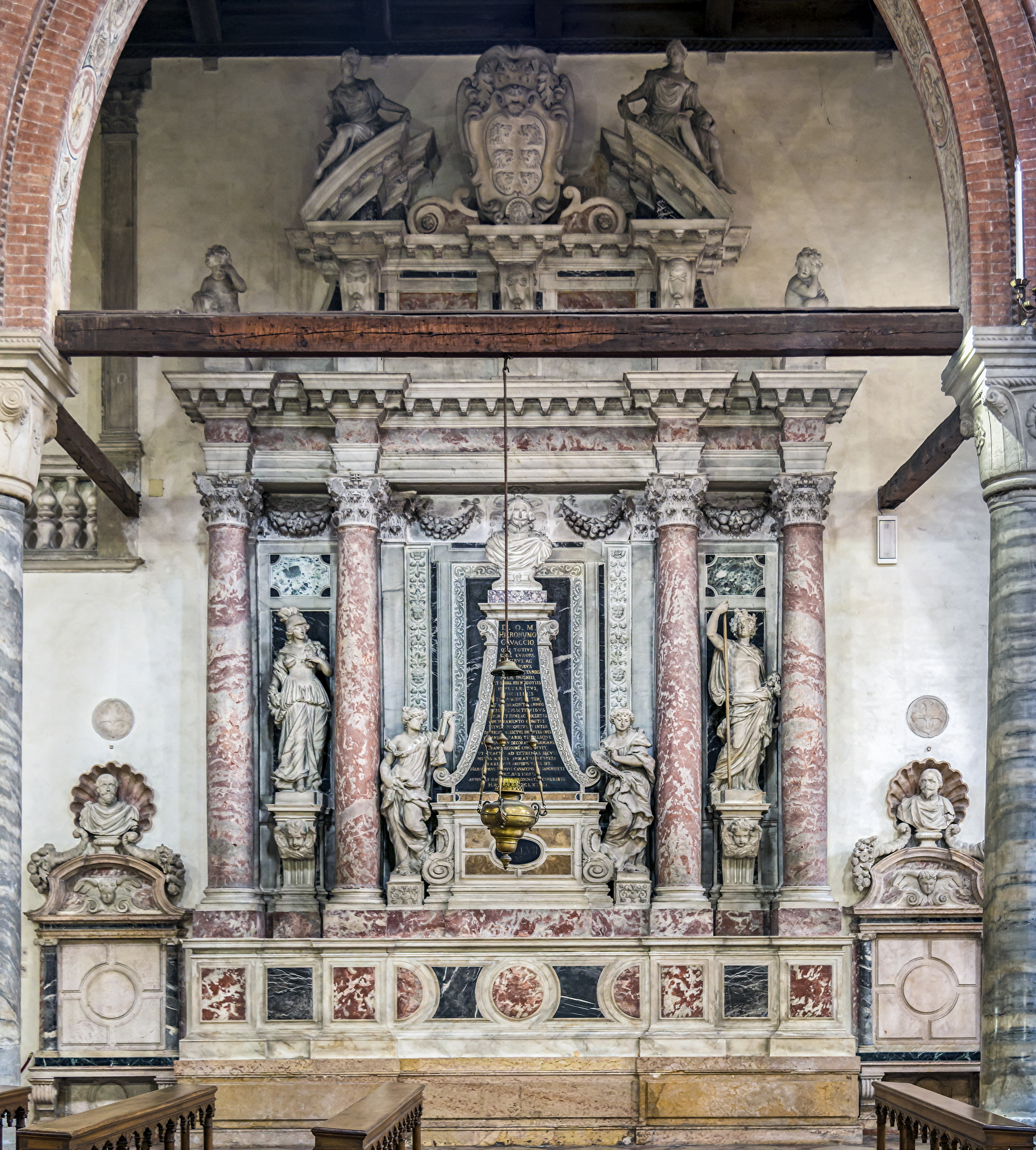
Monument to Gerolamo Cavazza

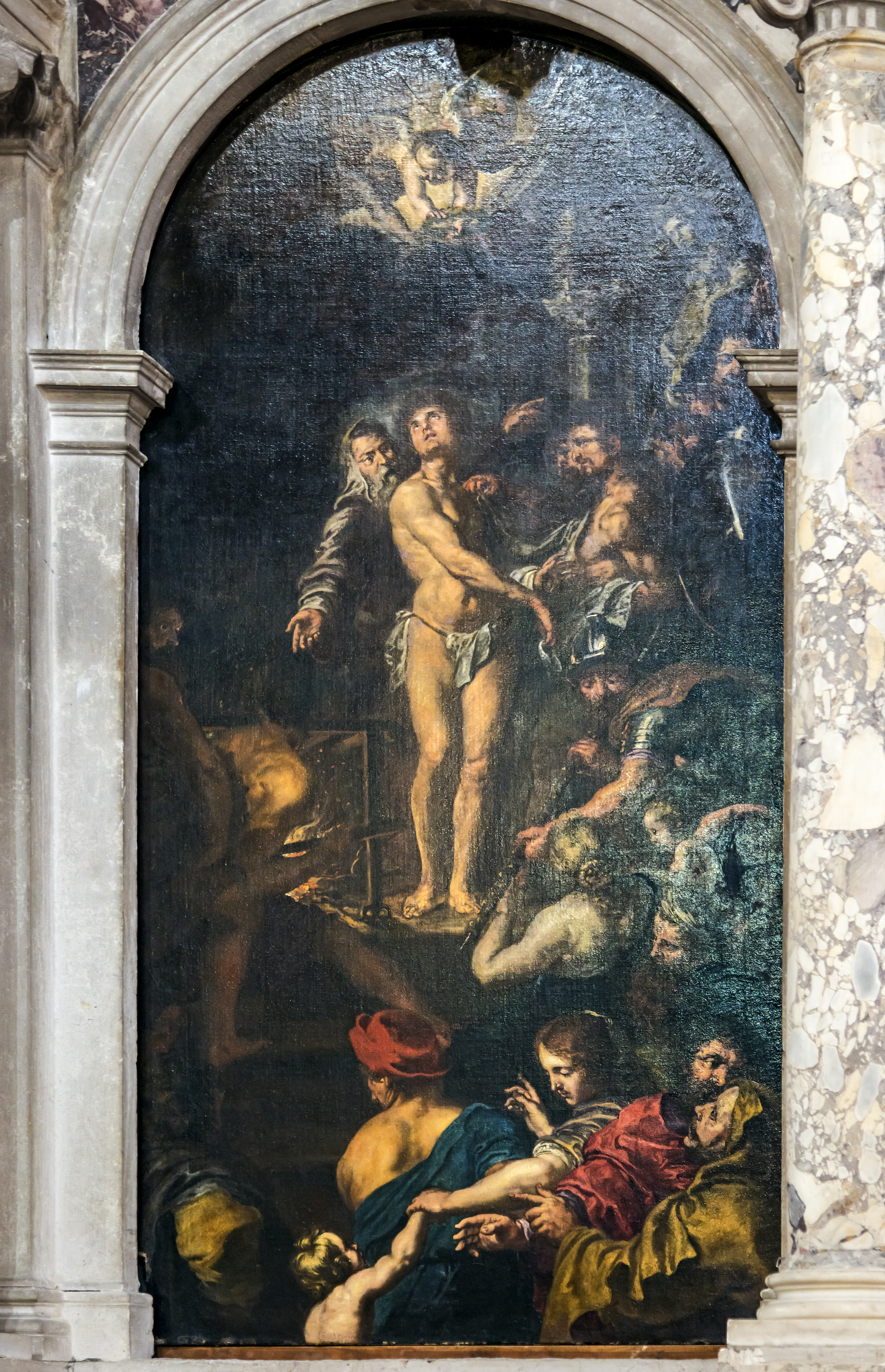
Martyrdom of St. Lawrence, by Daniel van den Dyck

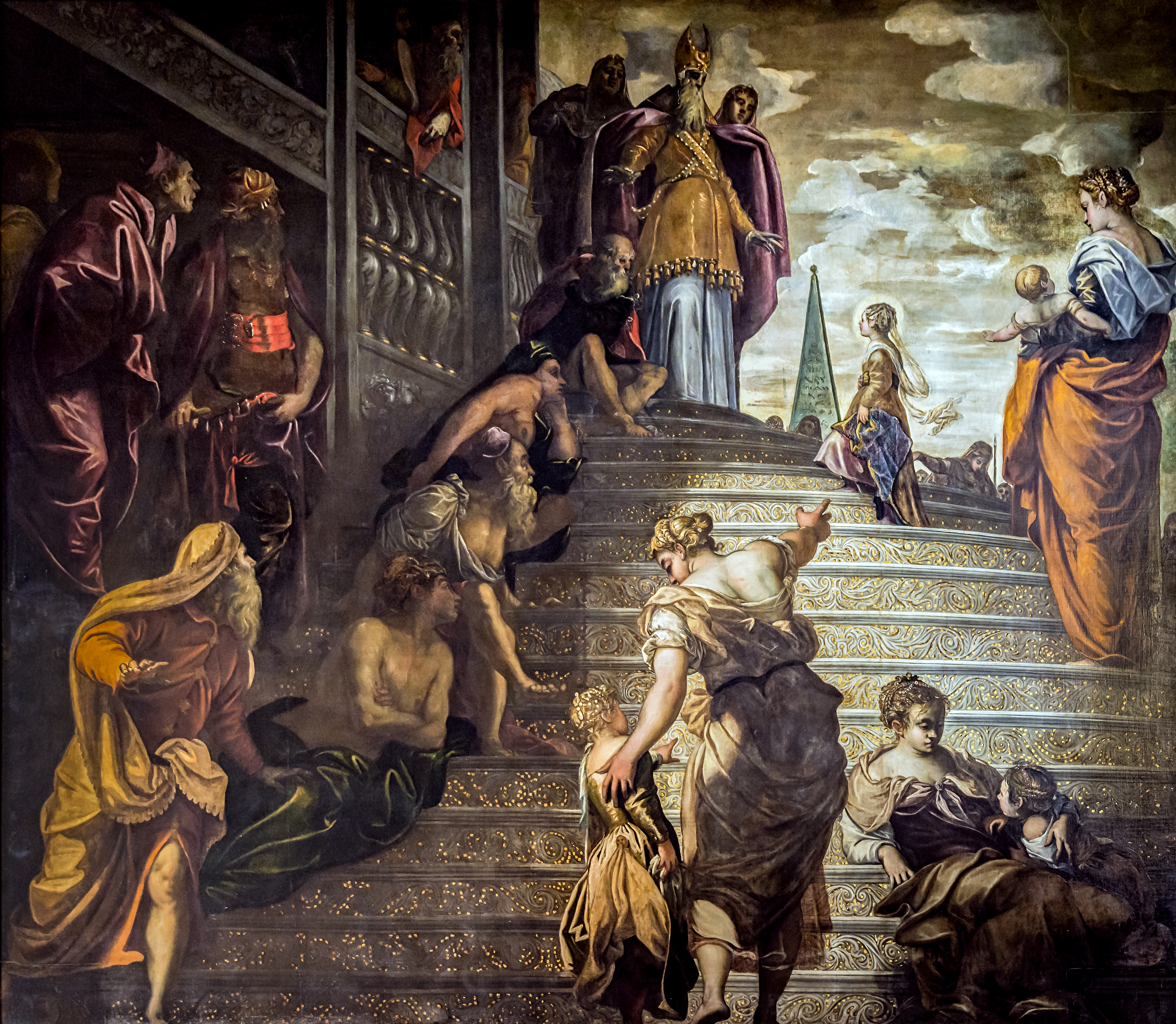
Presentation of Virgin at Temple Tintoretto

St Mauro Chapel:

The San Mauro Chapel contains the statue from which the church derives its name. The Presentation in the Temple is located over the entrance to the San Mauro chapel in the south aisle, close to the east end.

- St Leonardo Murialdo (1983) Ernani Costantini
- Madonna with Child and St Mauro abbott, Antonio Molinari.
- Pieta, copy of work by Savoldo
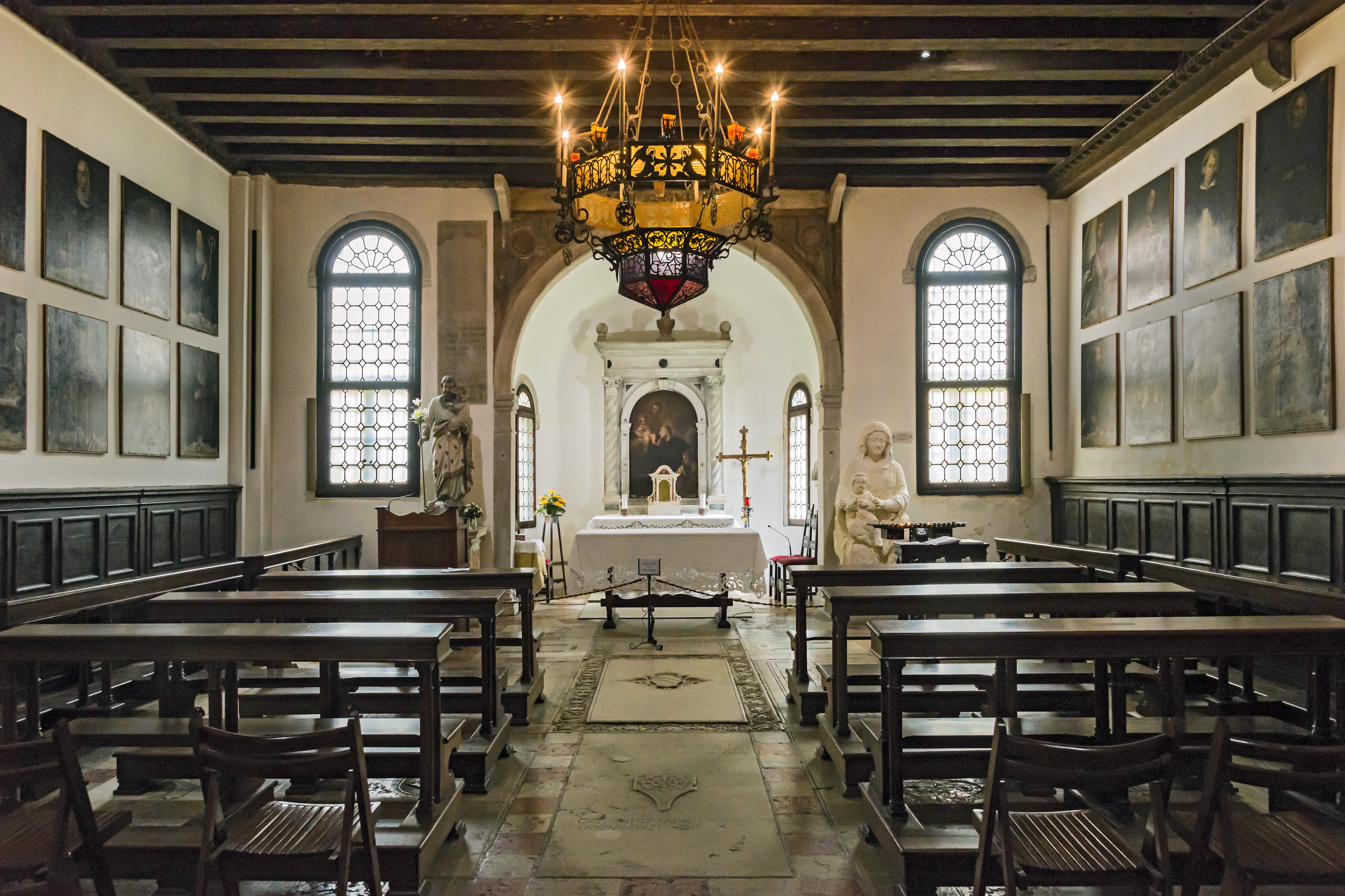
St Mauro Chapel

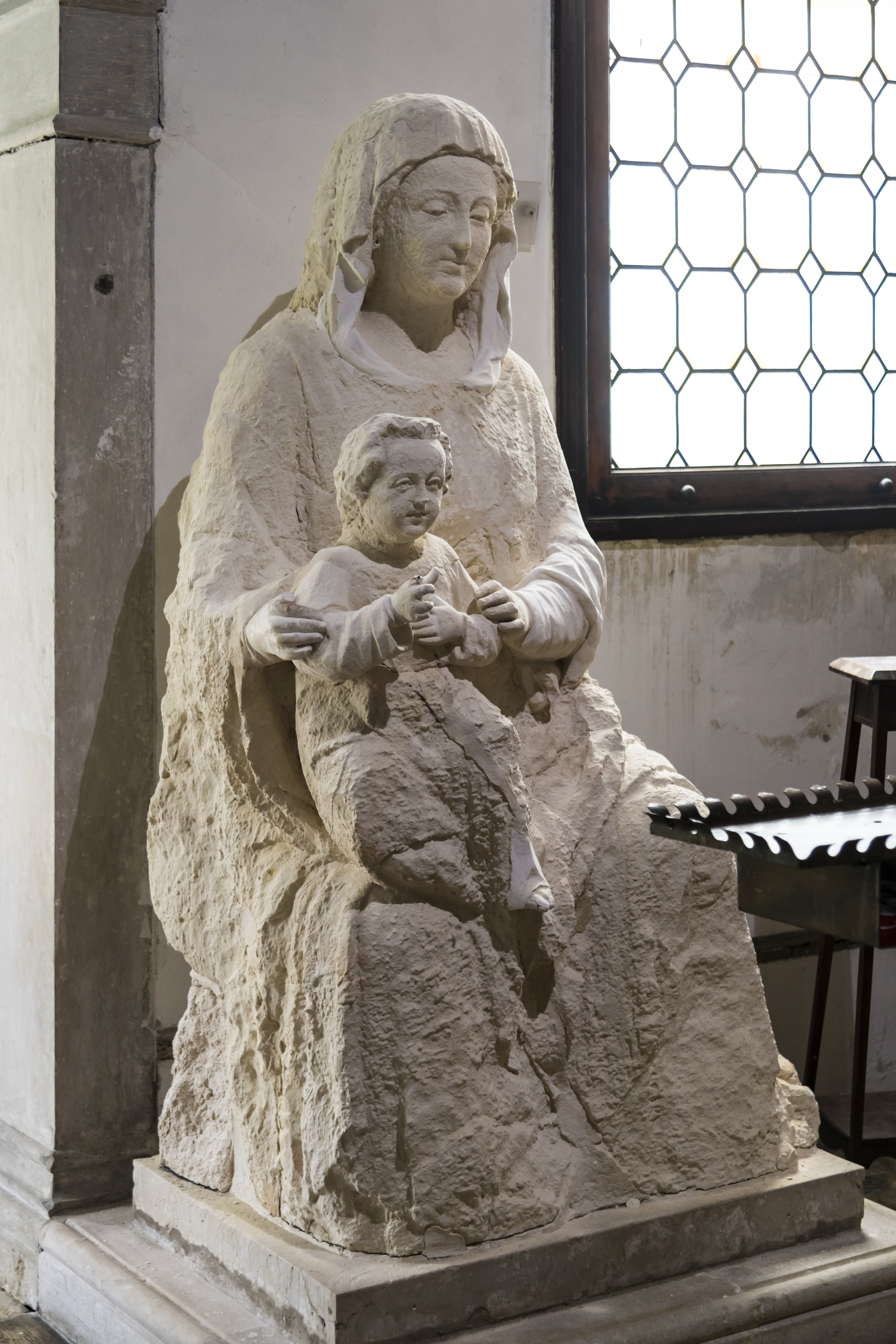
Statue of Madonna dell'Orto

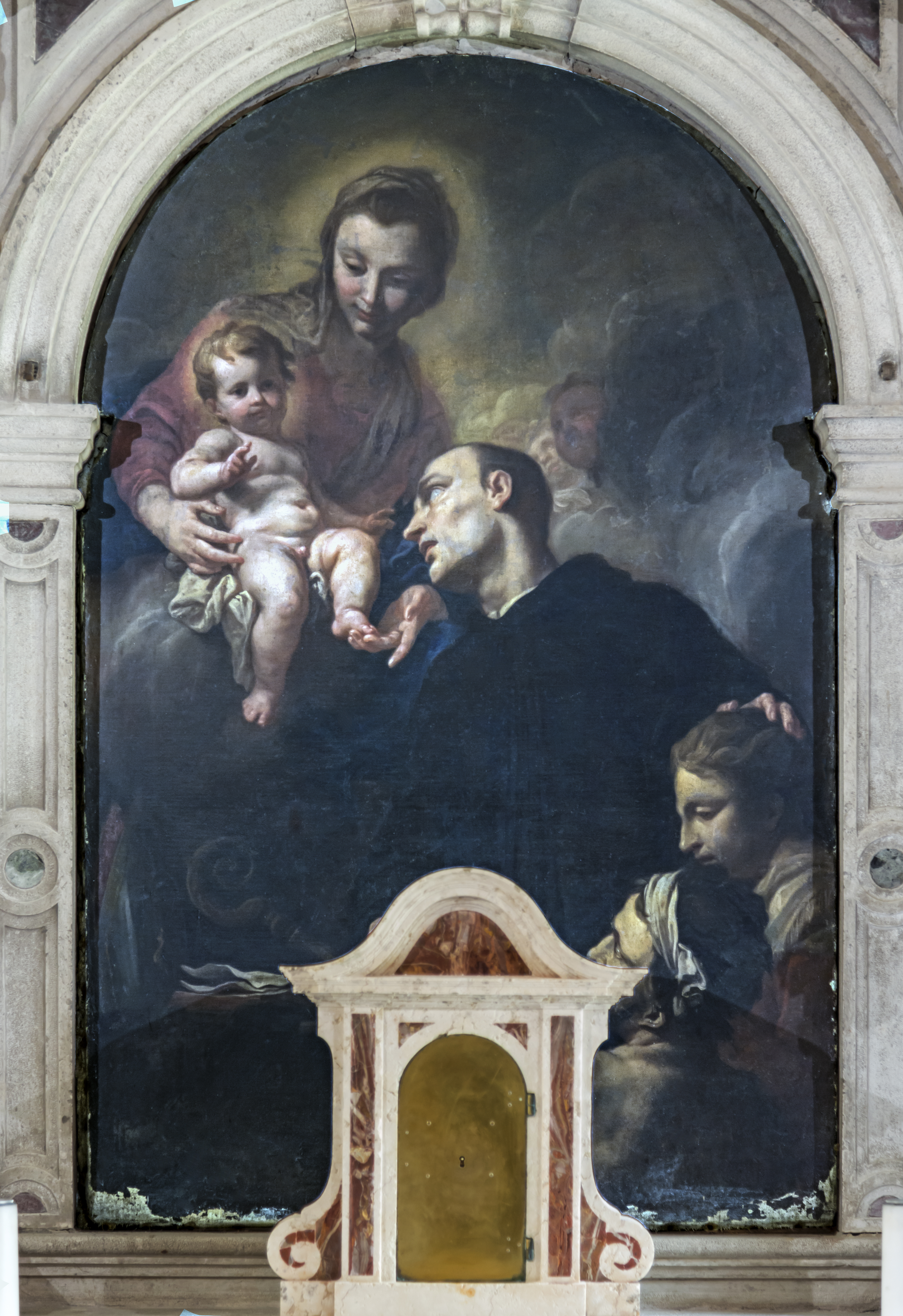
Madonna with Child and St Mauro abbott, Antonio Molinari
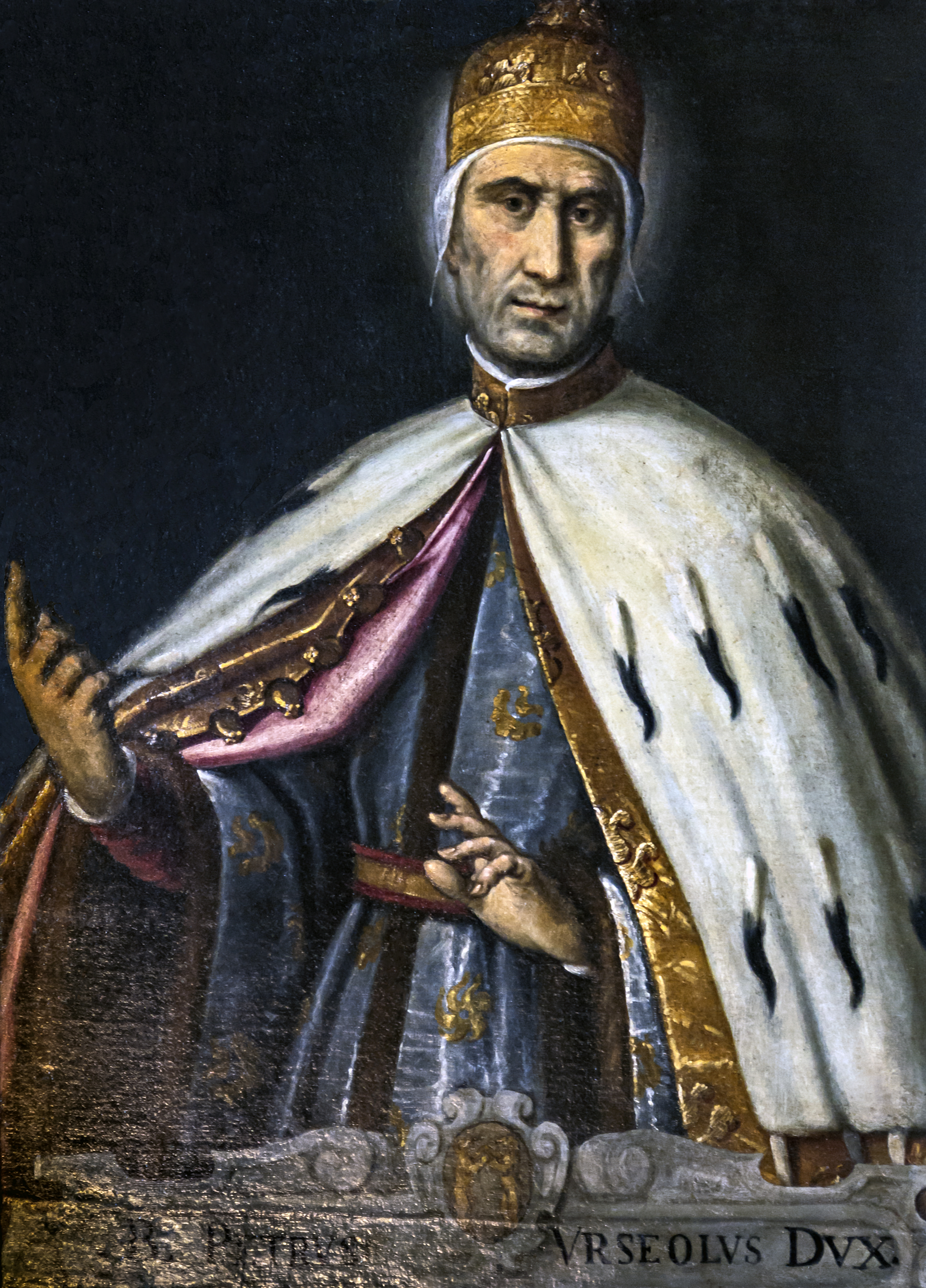
Pietro I Orseolo

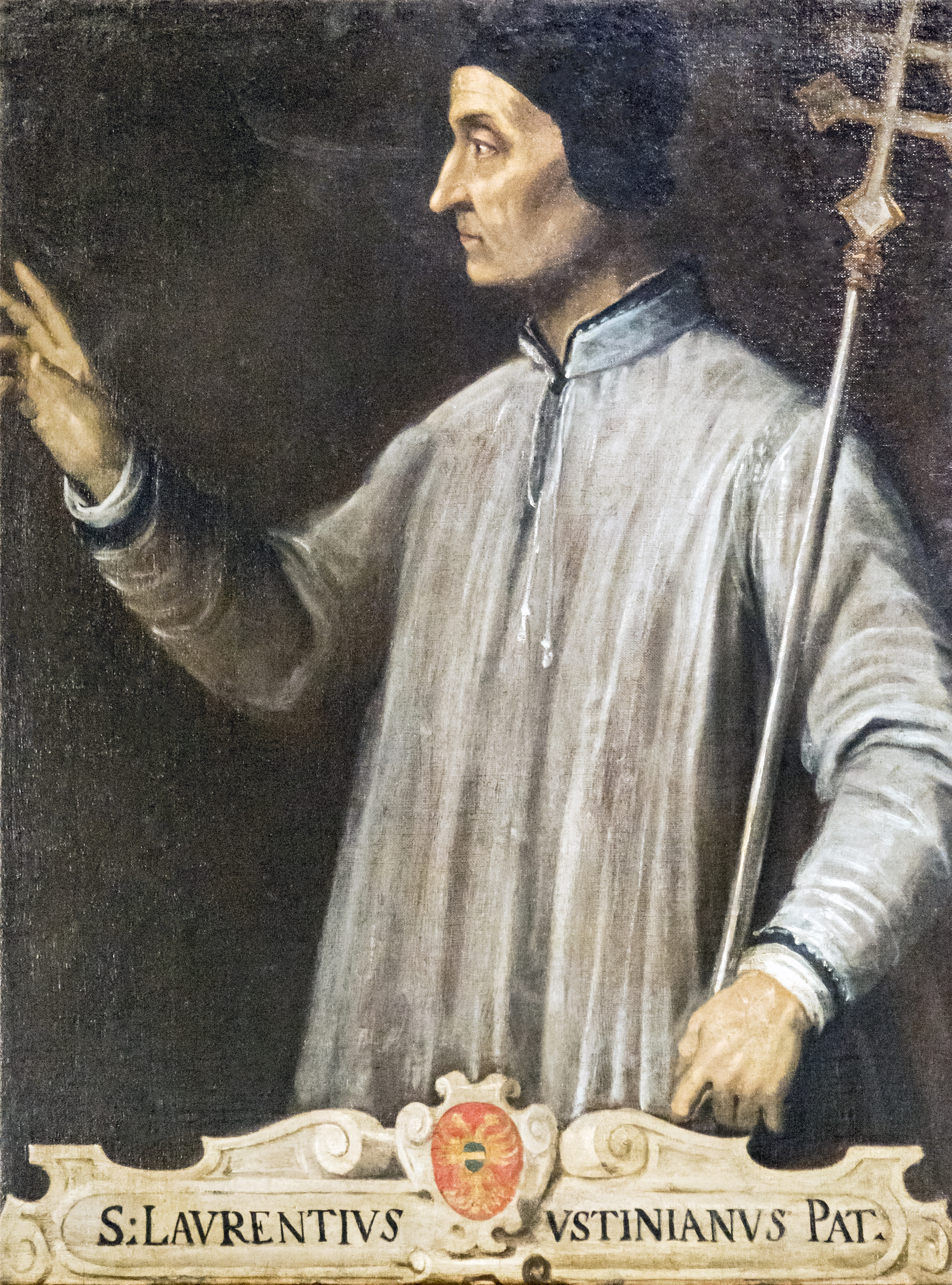
Lawrence Giustiniani

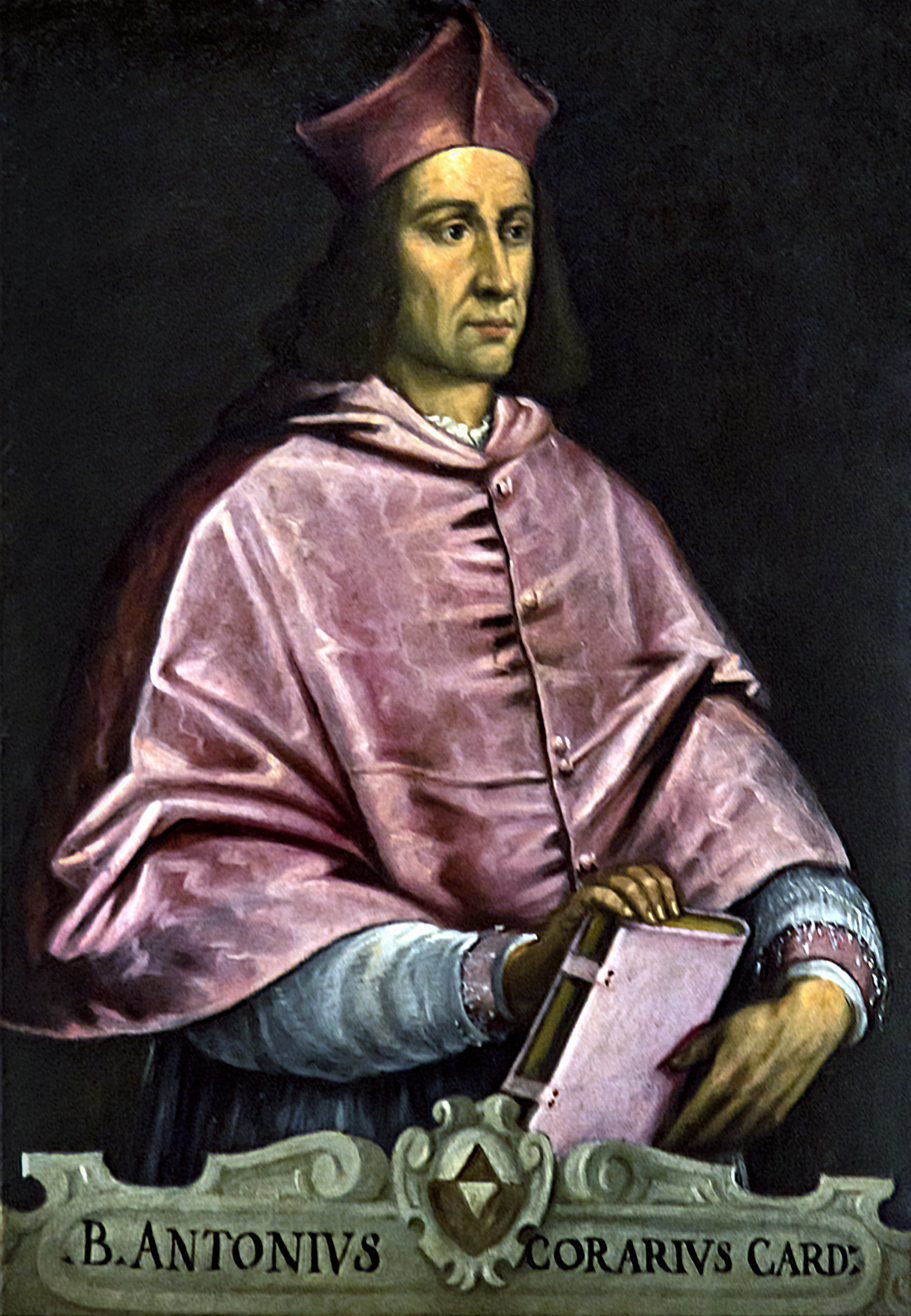
Antonio Correr

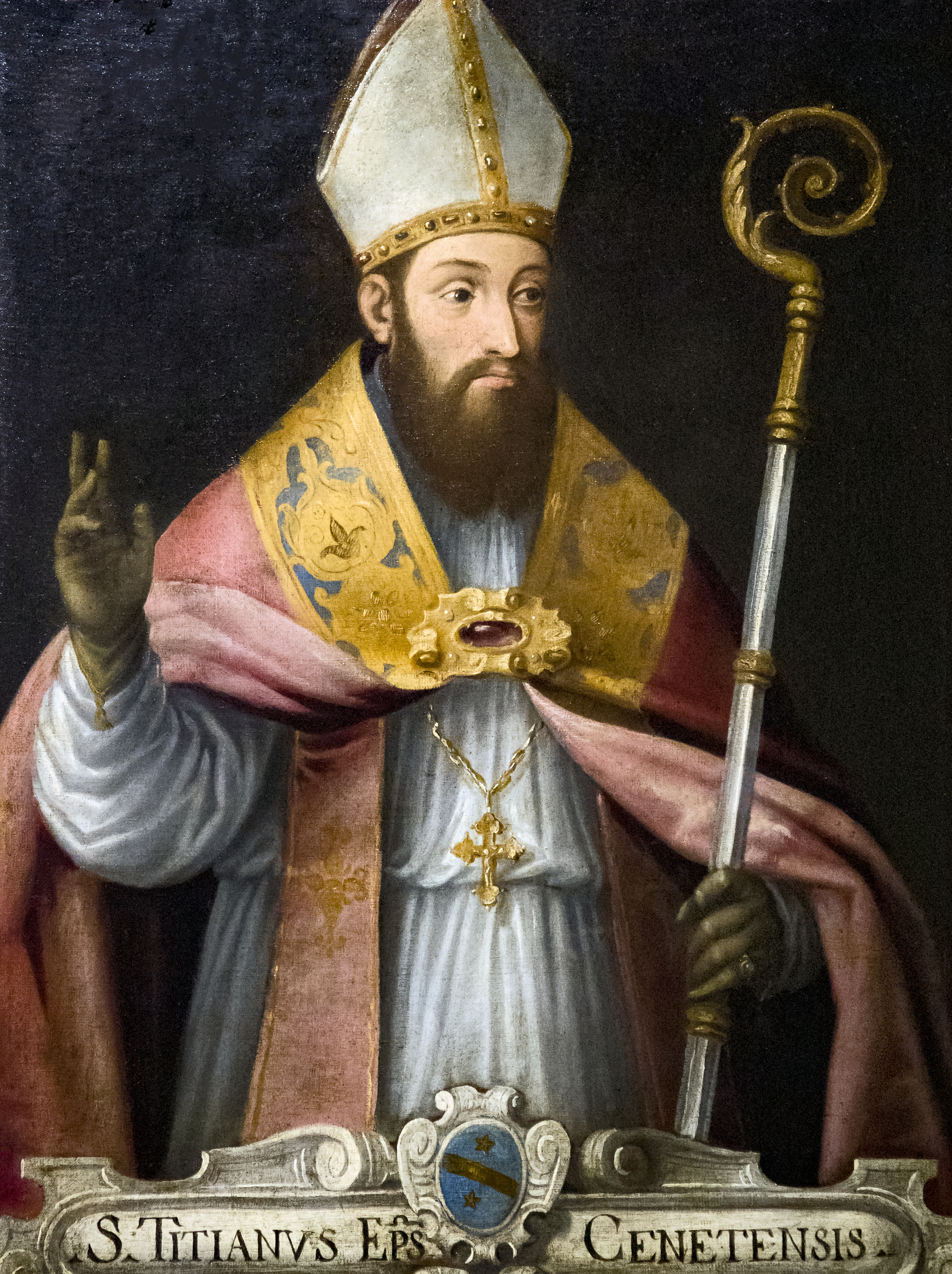
Titian of Oderzo

=== Left of main Nave ===
There are four funerary chapels built on the left side of the church, which house the remains of four of the most important Venetian patrician families.

Valier Chapel:

The Renaissance Valier Chapel once housed a small Madonna with Child by Giovanni Bellini (1481), stolen in 1993.

- Madonna with Child (1480) Giovanni Bellini (copy)
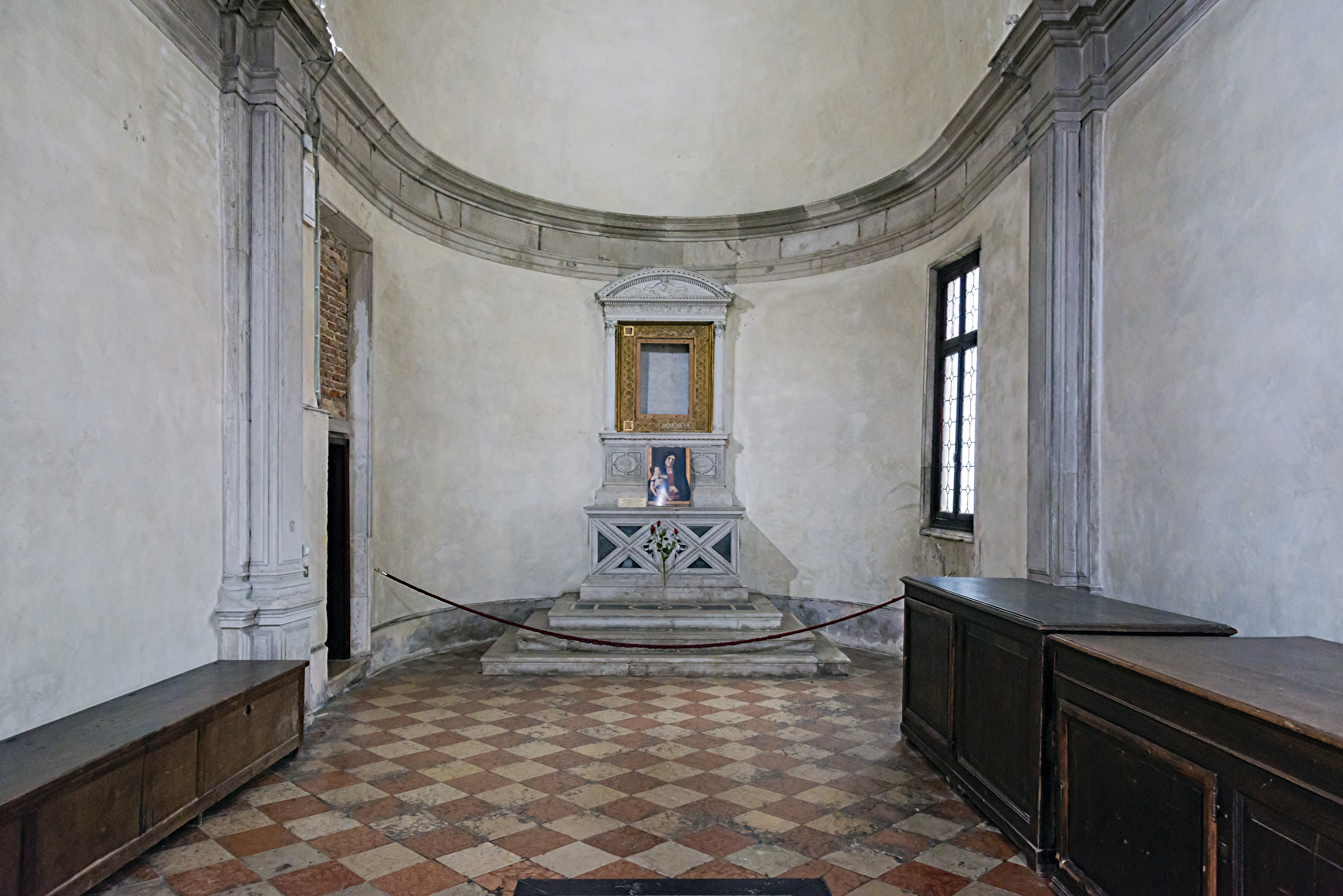
Chapel Valier

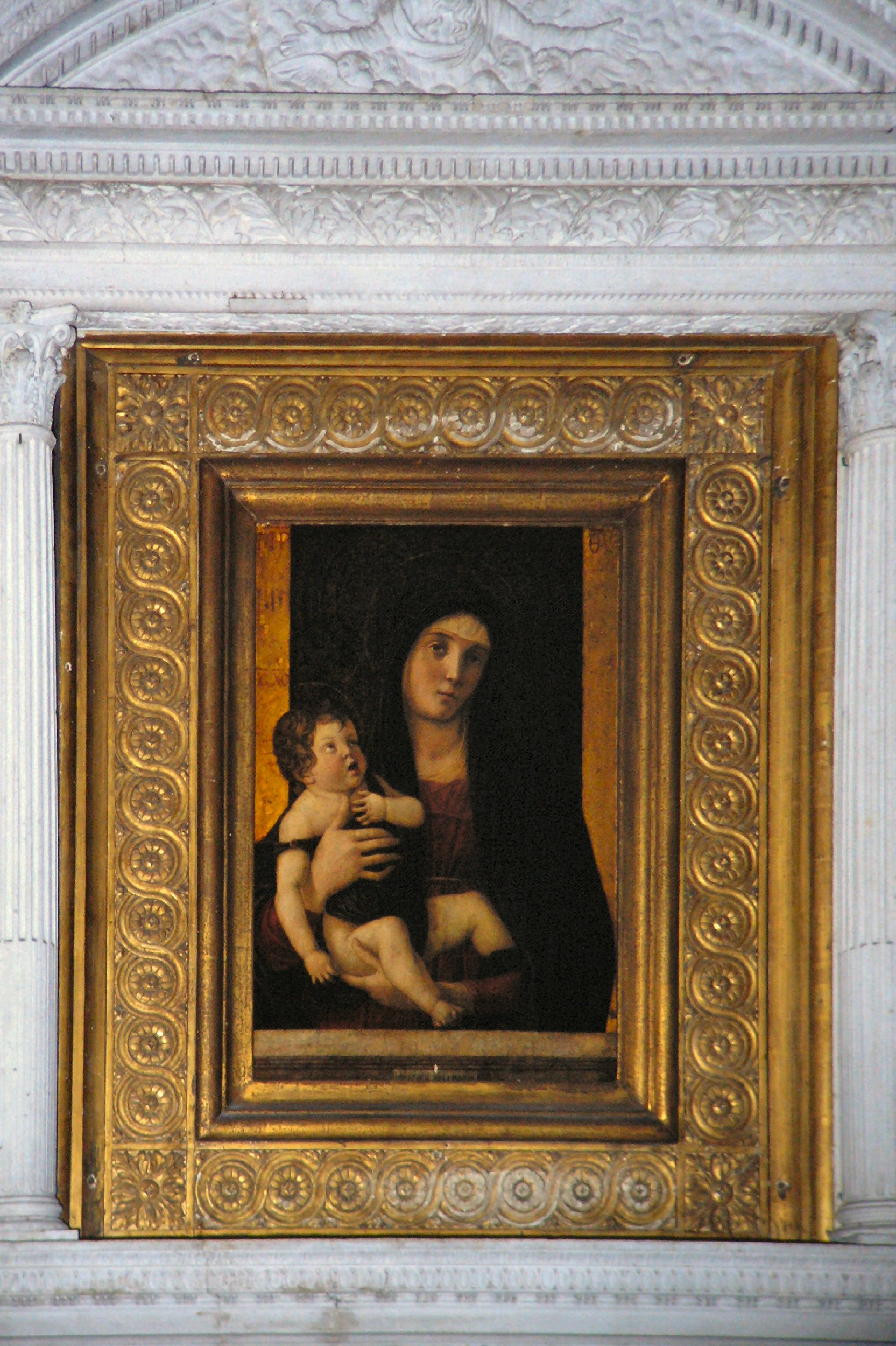
Madonna with Child (1480) Giovanni Bellini

Vendramin Chapel:

- Arcangel Raphael and Tobias (1530) Titian, now in sacristy of San Marziale
- Painting of St Vincent with saints Domenic, Lorenzo Giustiniani, Elena and Pope Eugenius IV by Jacopo Palma the Elder. Figures of Saint Helena and St Domenic inserted during restoration in 1867 by Placido Fabris
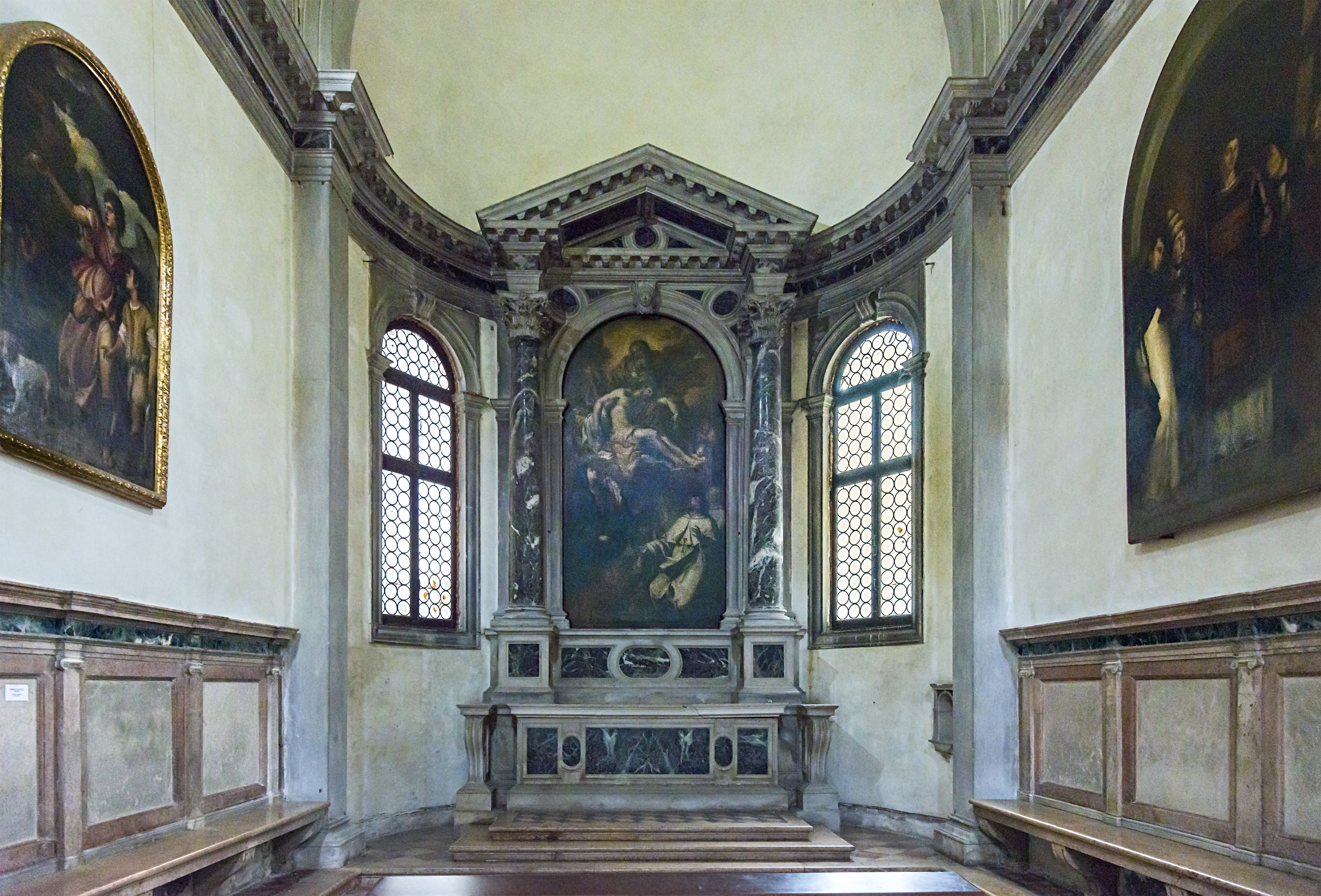
Vendramin Chapel

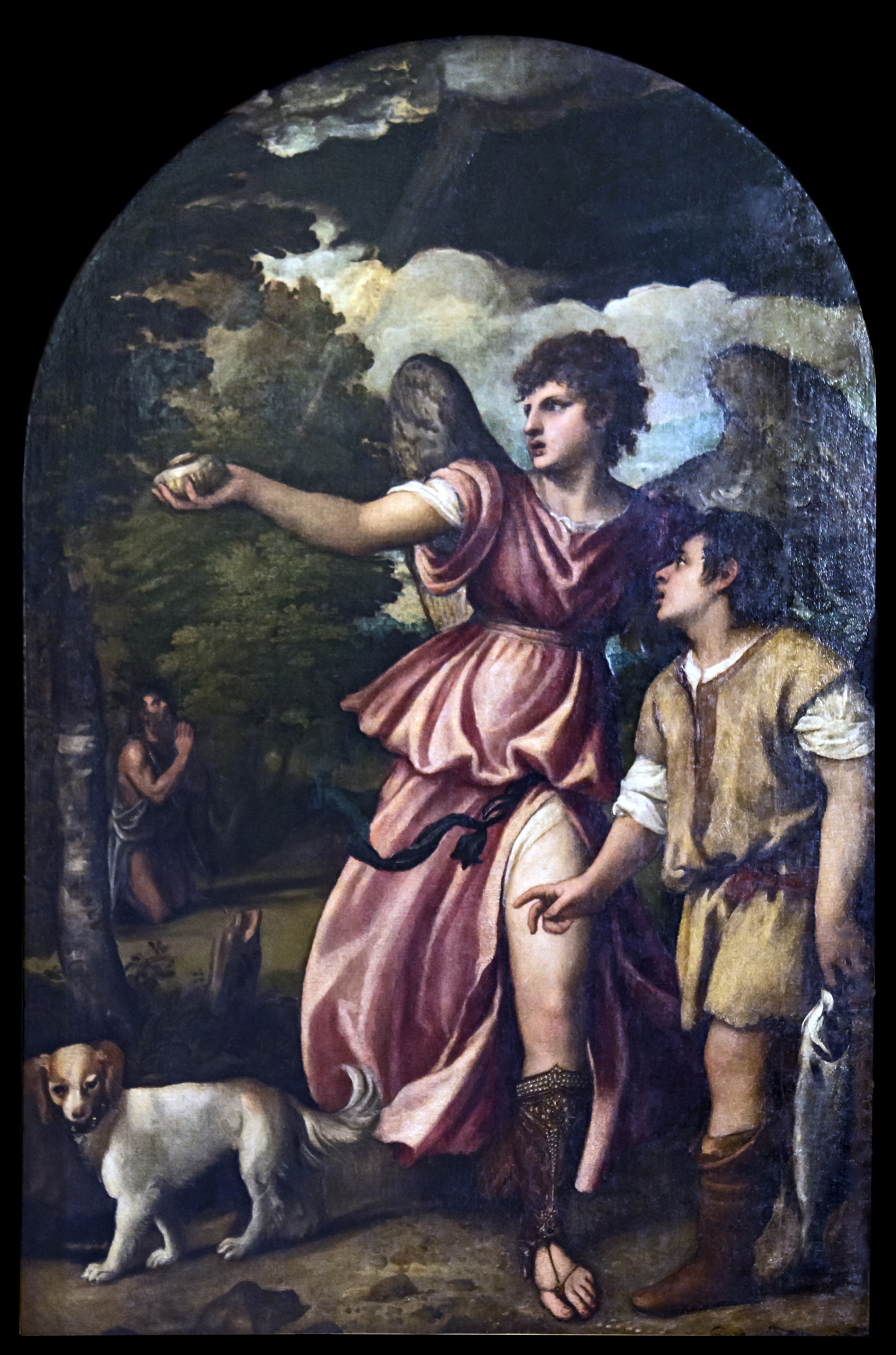
Arcangel Raphael and Tobias by Titien

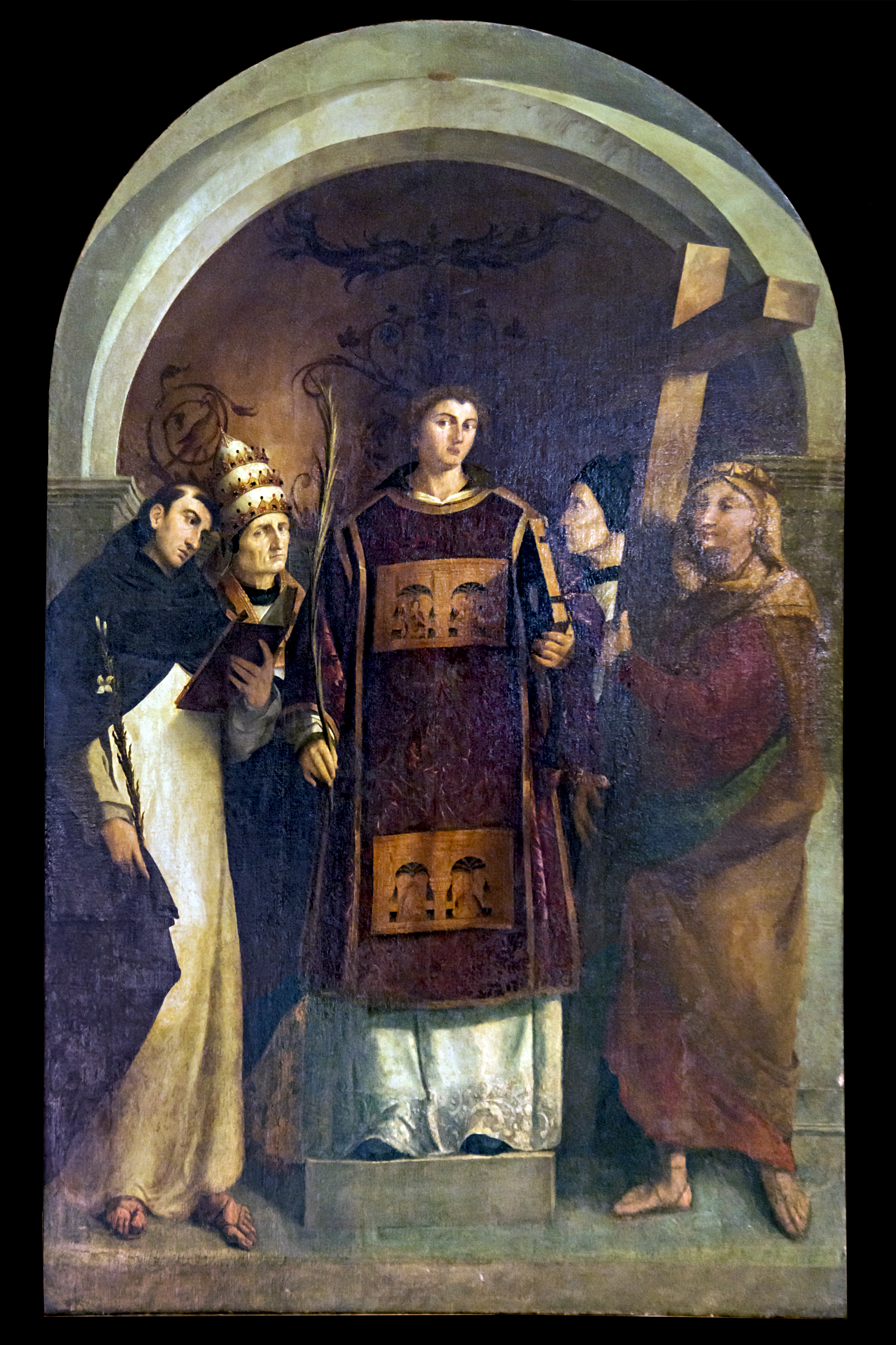
St Vincent with saints Domenic, Lorenzo Giustiniani, Elena and Pope Eugenius IV by Jacopo Palma the Elder

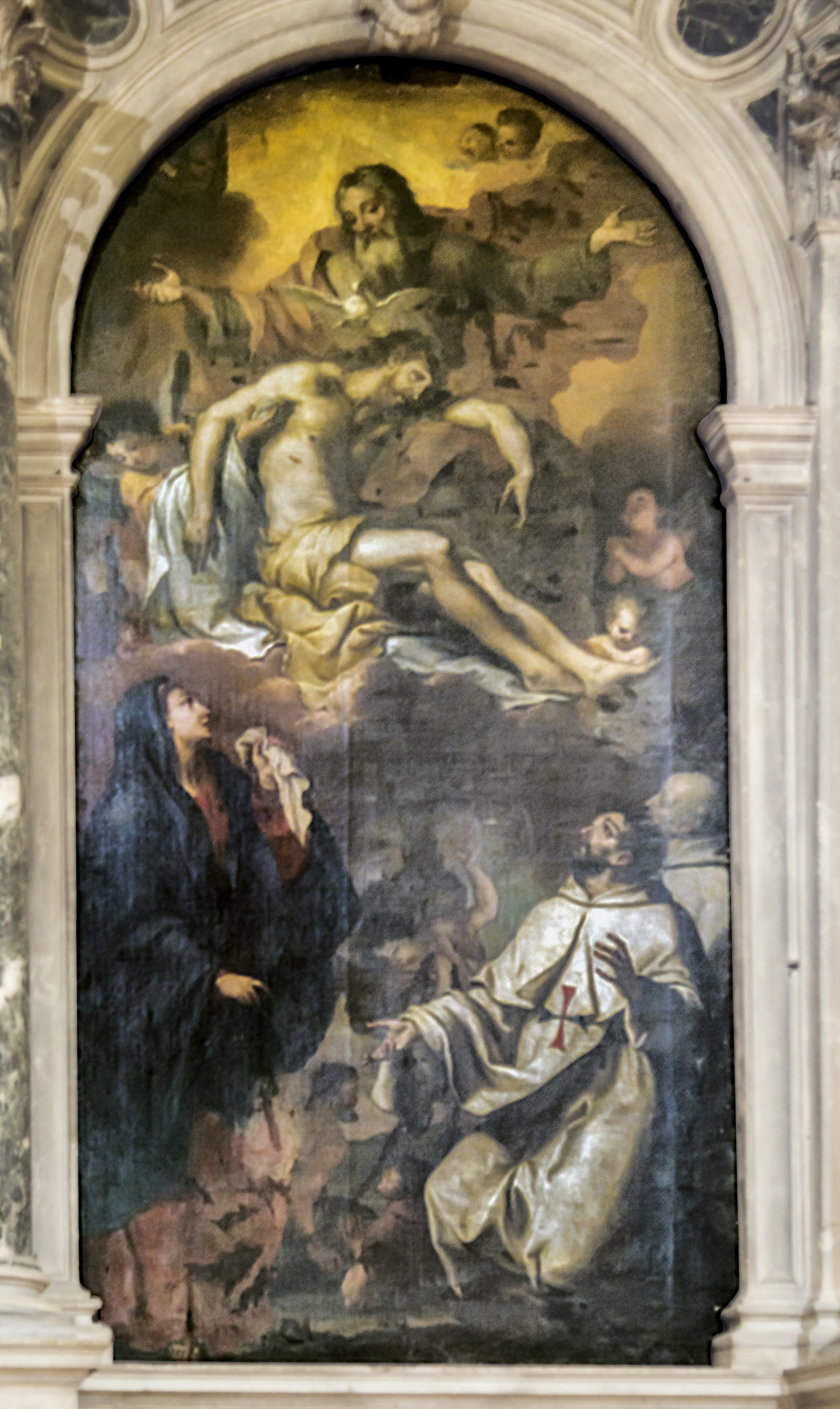
Cristo morto accolto dal Padre Bartolomeo Litterini

Morosini Chapel:

- The Nativity and Saint Dominic Domenico Tintoretto
- Angels bearing incense, Domenico Tintoretto
- Crucifixion, Jacopo Palma il Giovane from church of St Ternita
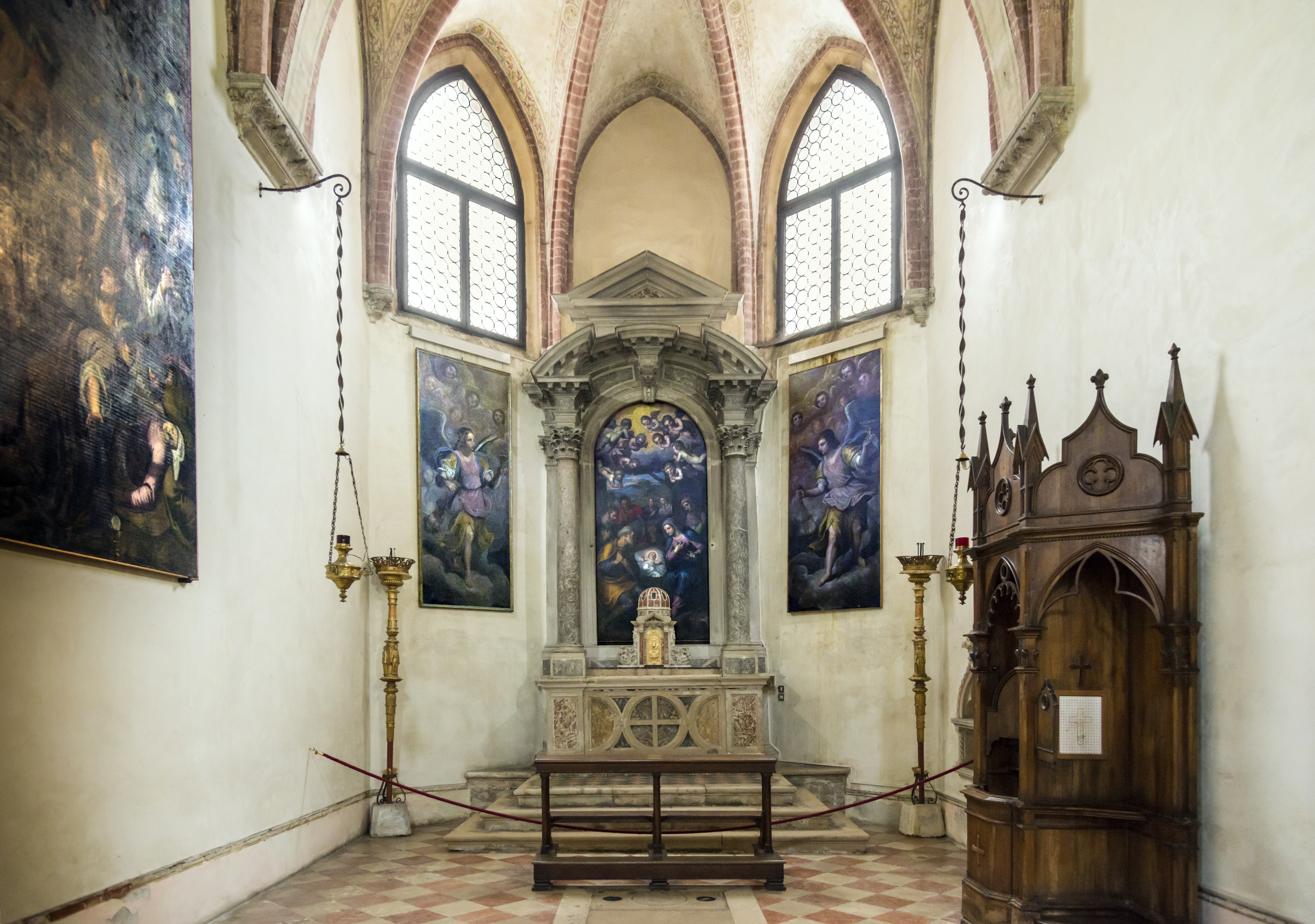
Chapel Morosini

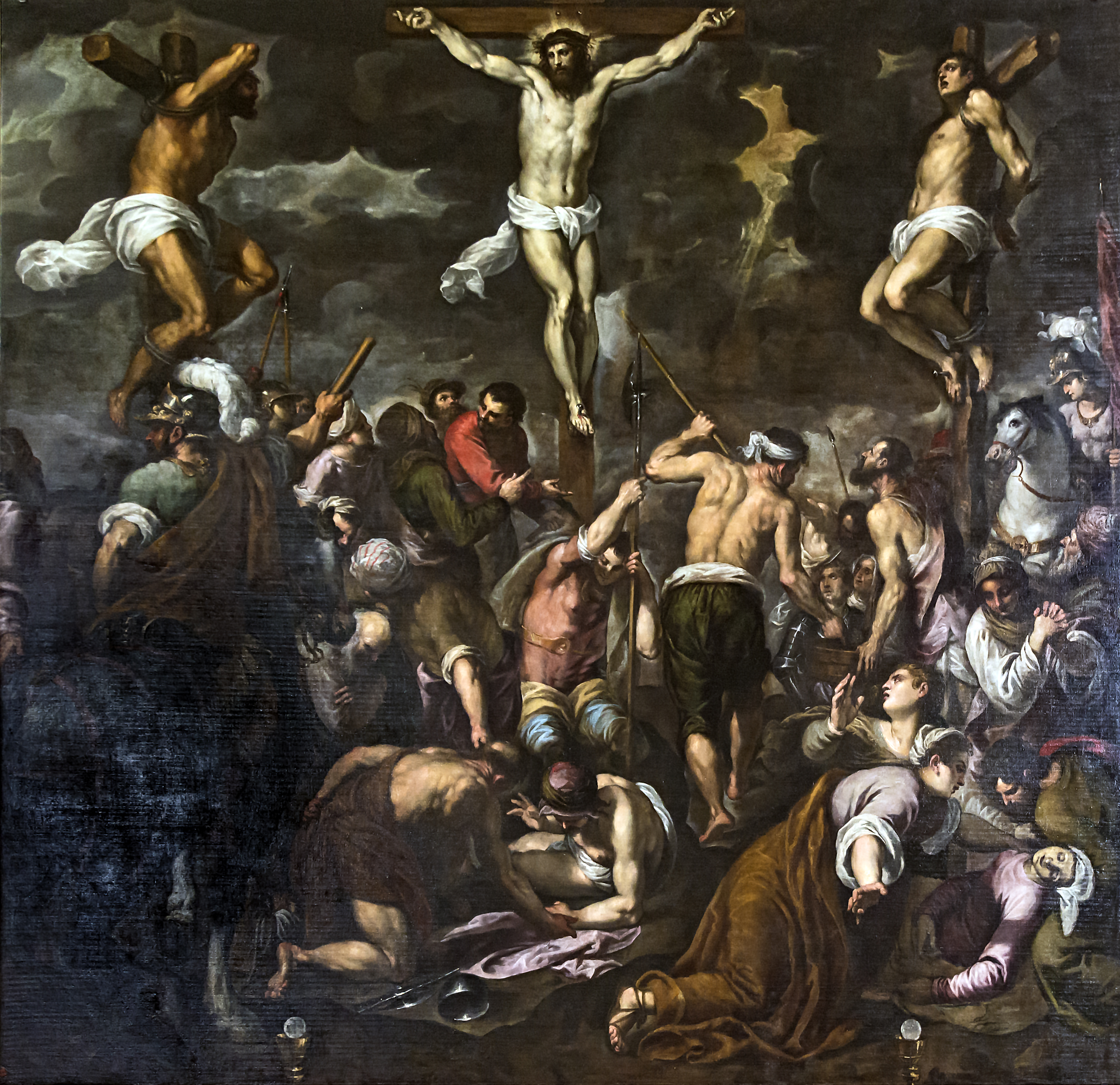
Crucifixion Palma il Giovane

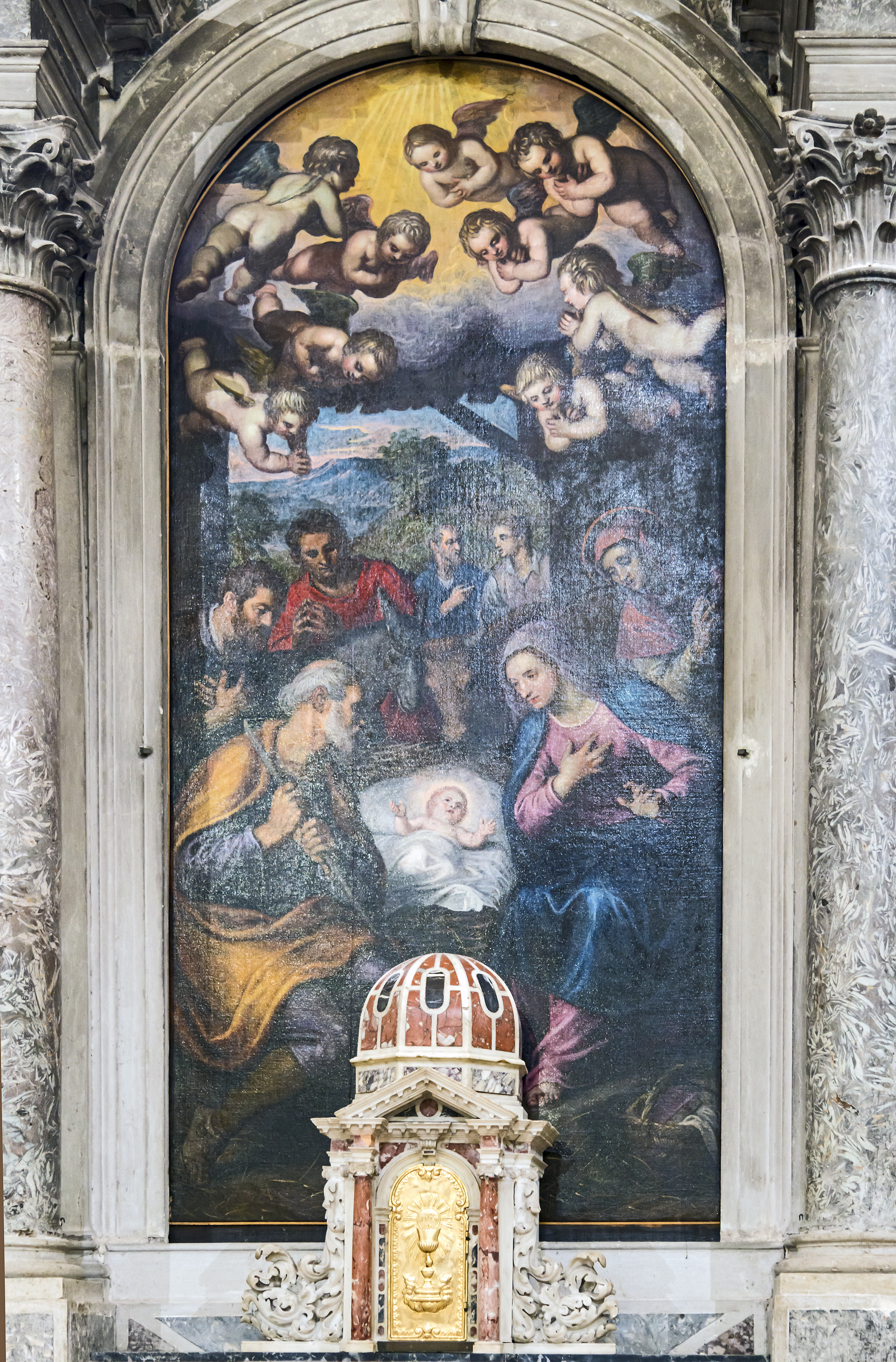
The Nativity and Saint Dominic Domenico Tintoretto

The fourth chapel in the north aisle is the Capella Contarini. Dedicated to Saint Agnes, it contains Tintoretto's Miracle of St Agnes (1575). Busts of the Contarini line the walls.

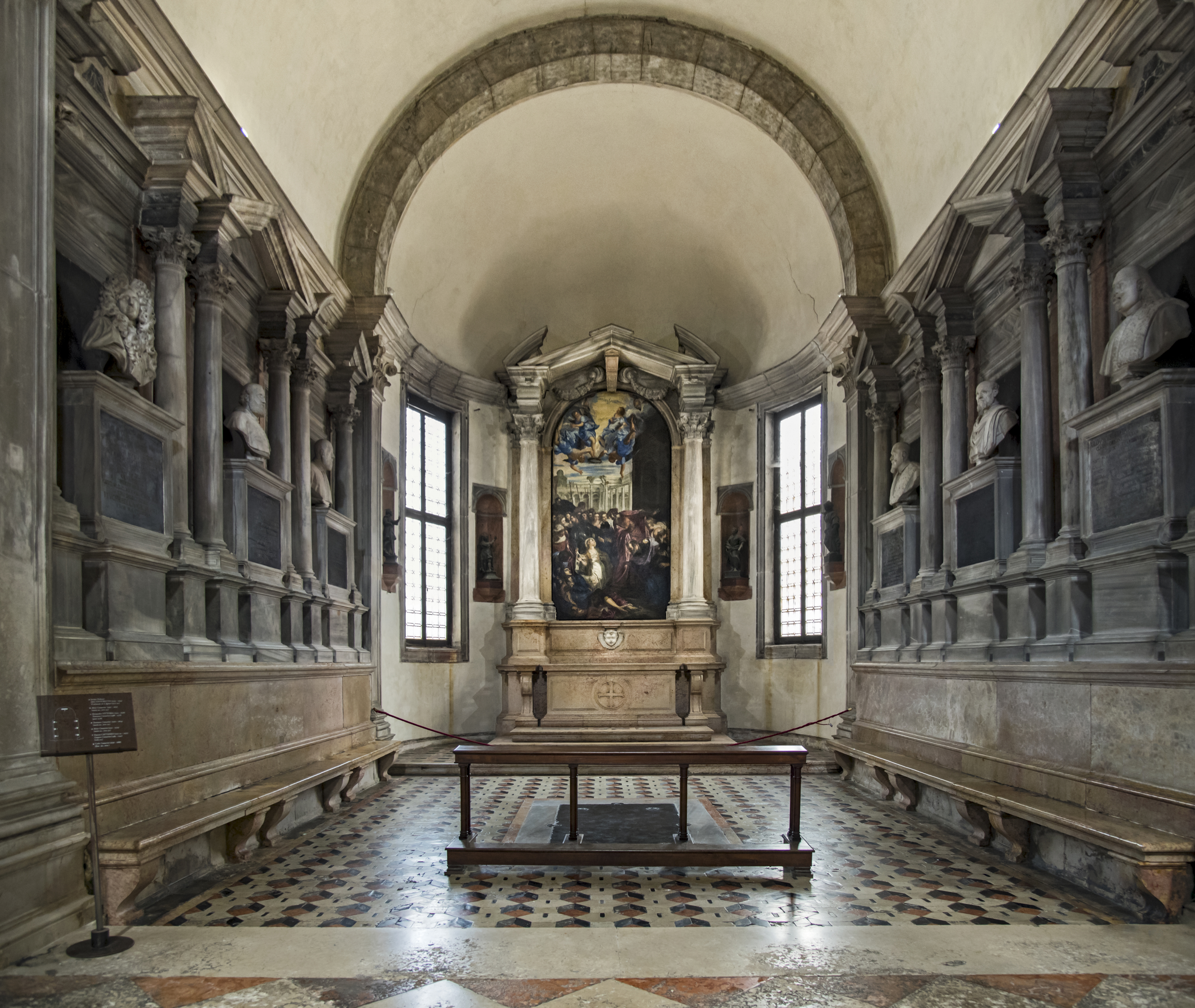
Contarini Chapel

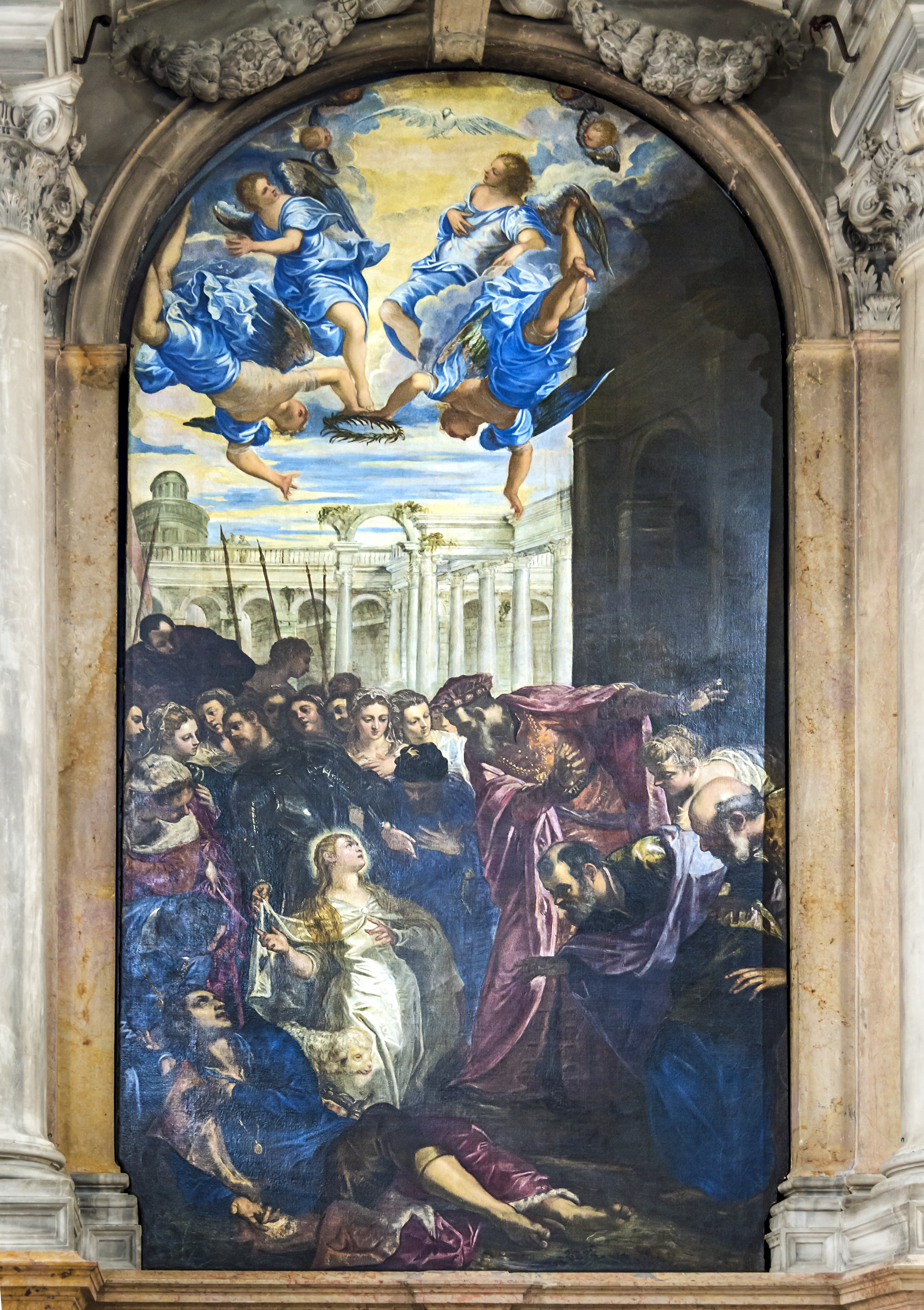
The miracle of Saint Agnes Tintoretto

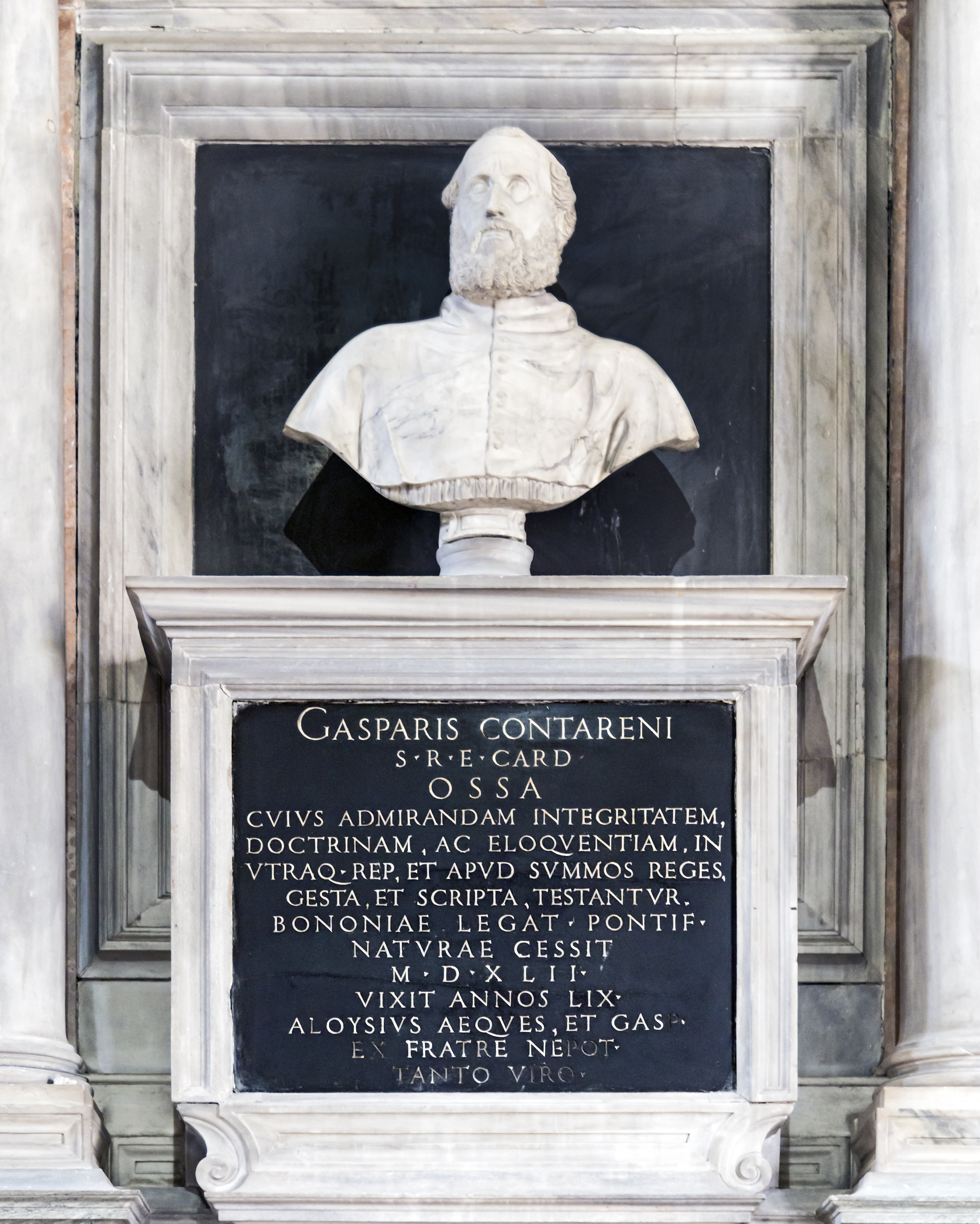
Gasparo Contarini (1483–1542)

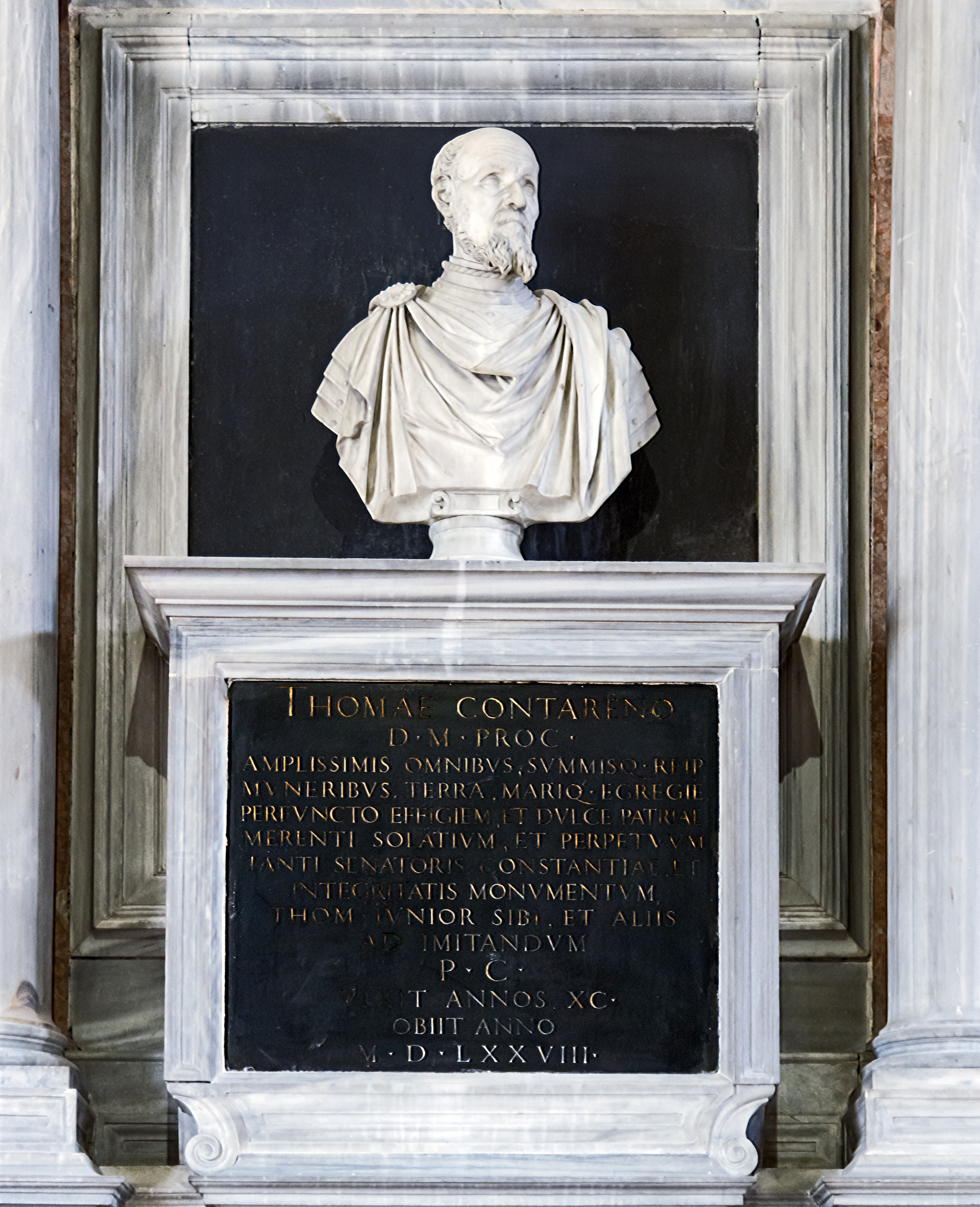
Tommaso Contarini (1488–1578) by Alessandro Vittoria
- St Lorenzo Giustiniani and Saints, altarpiece copy of Il Pordenone original.
- St George and the Dragon by Matteo Ponzone
- Flagellation of Christ, Matteo Ponzone
- God the Father in Glory (c. 1590) Domenico Tintoretto
- Mystic marriage of Saint Catherine of Alexandria, School of Titian
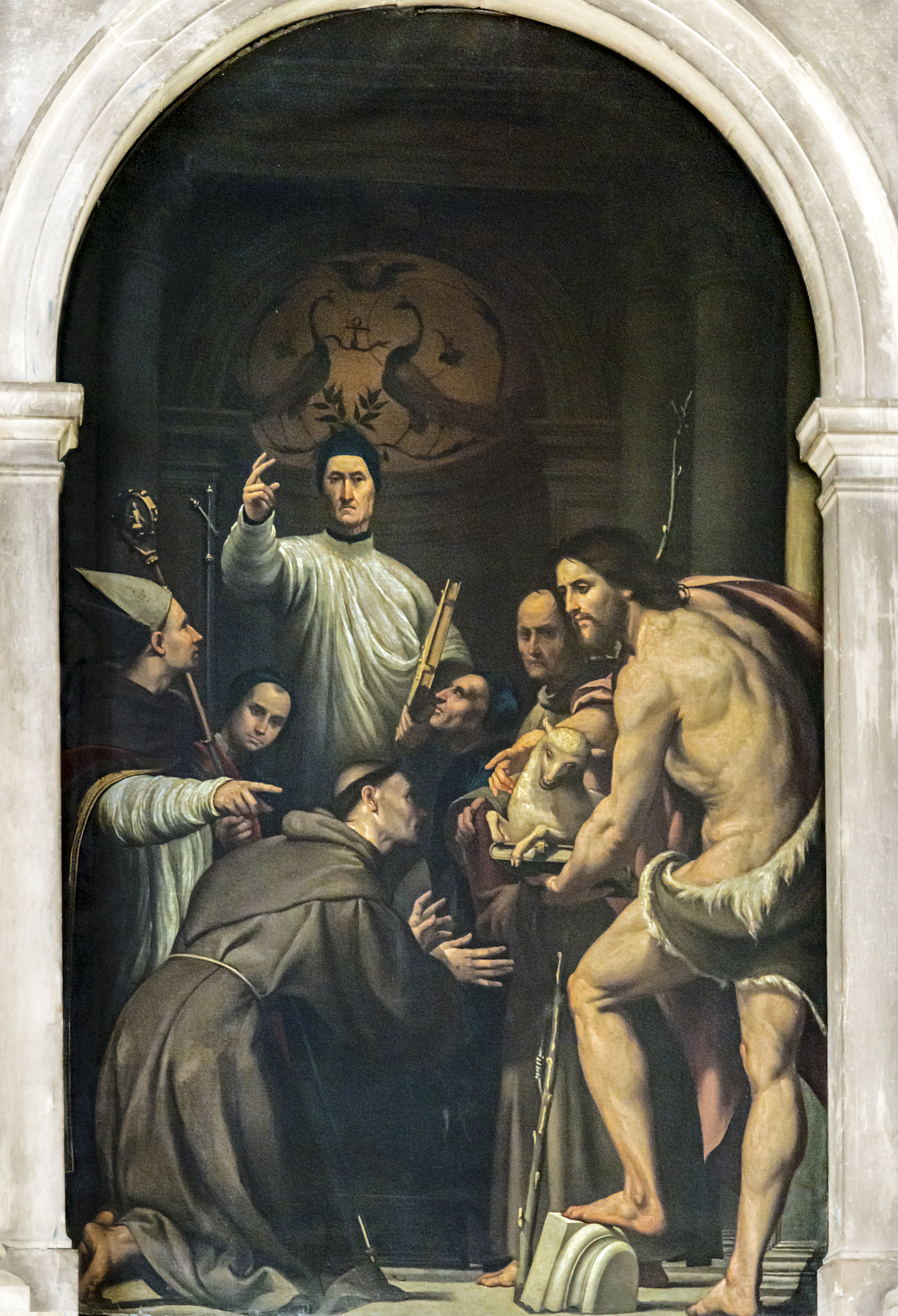
St Lorenzo Giustiniani and Saints

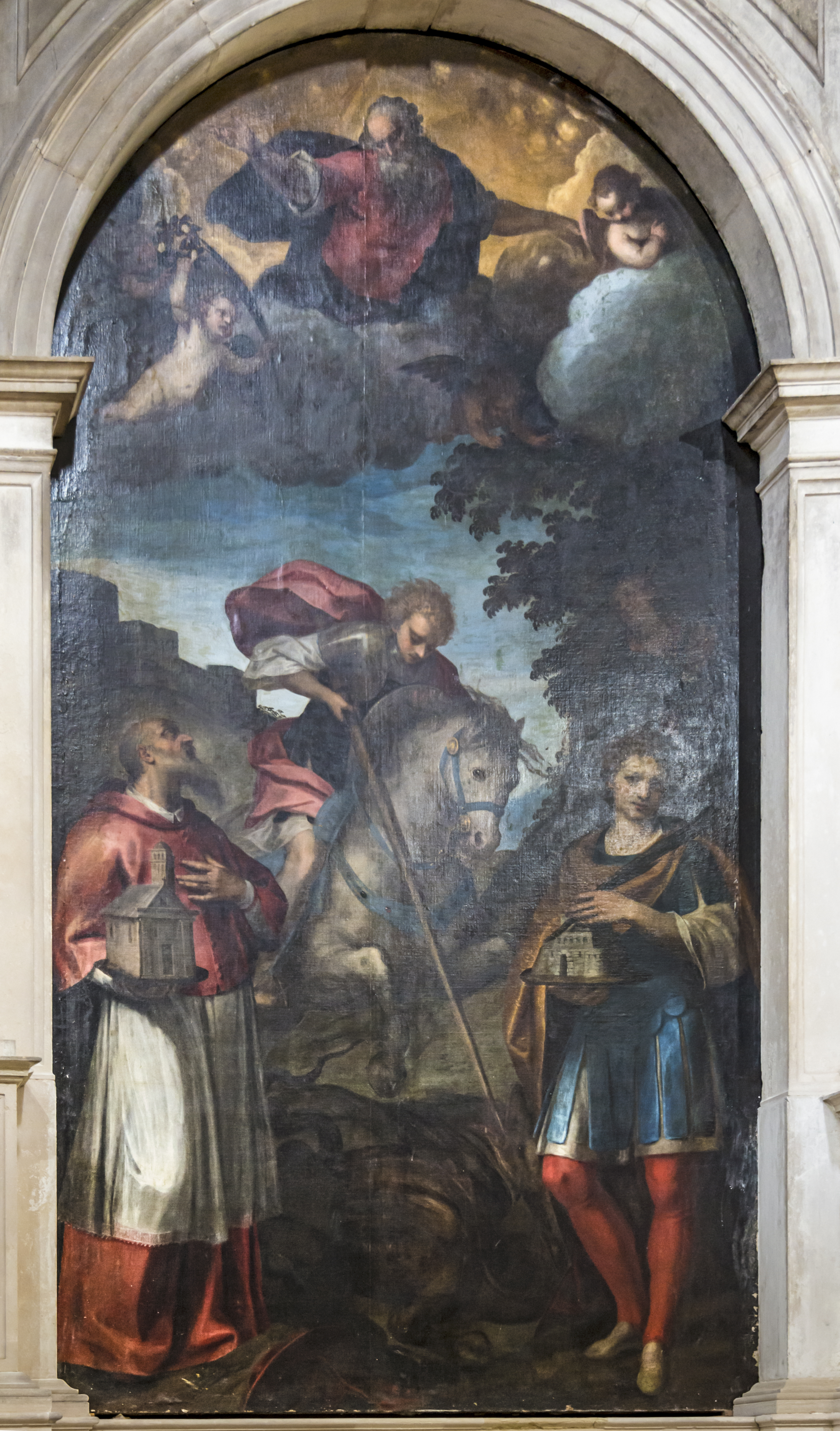
St George and the Dragon by Matteo Ponzone

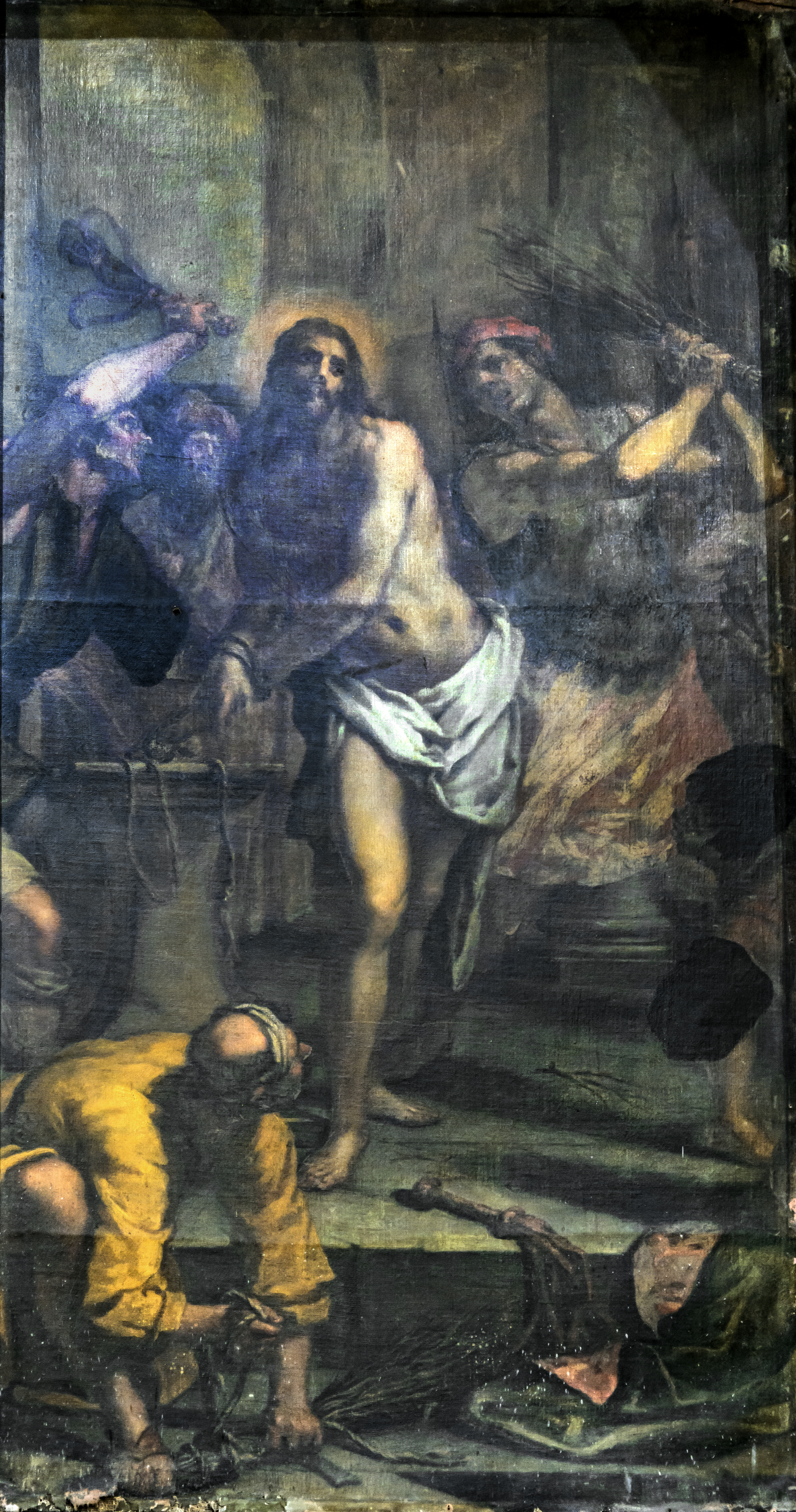
Flagellation of Christ by Matteo Ponzone

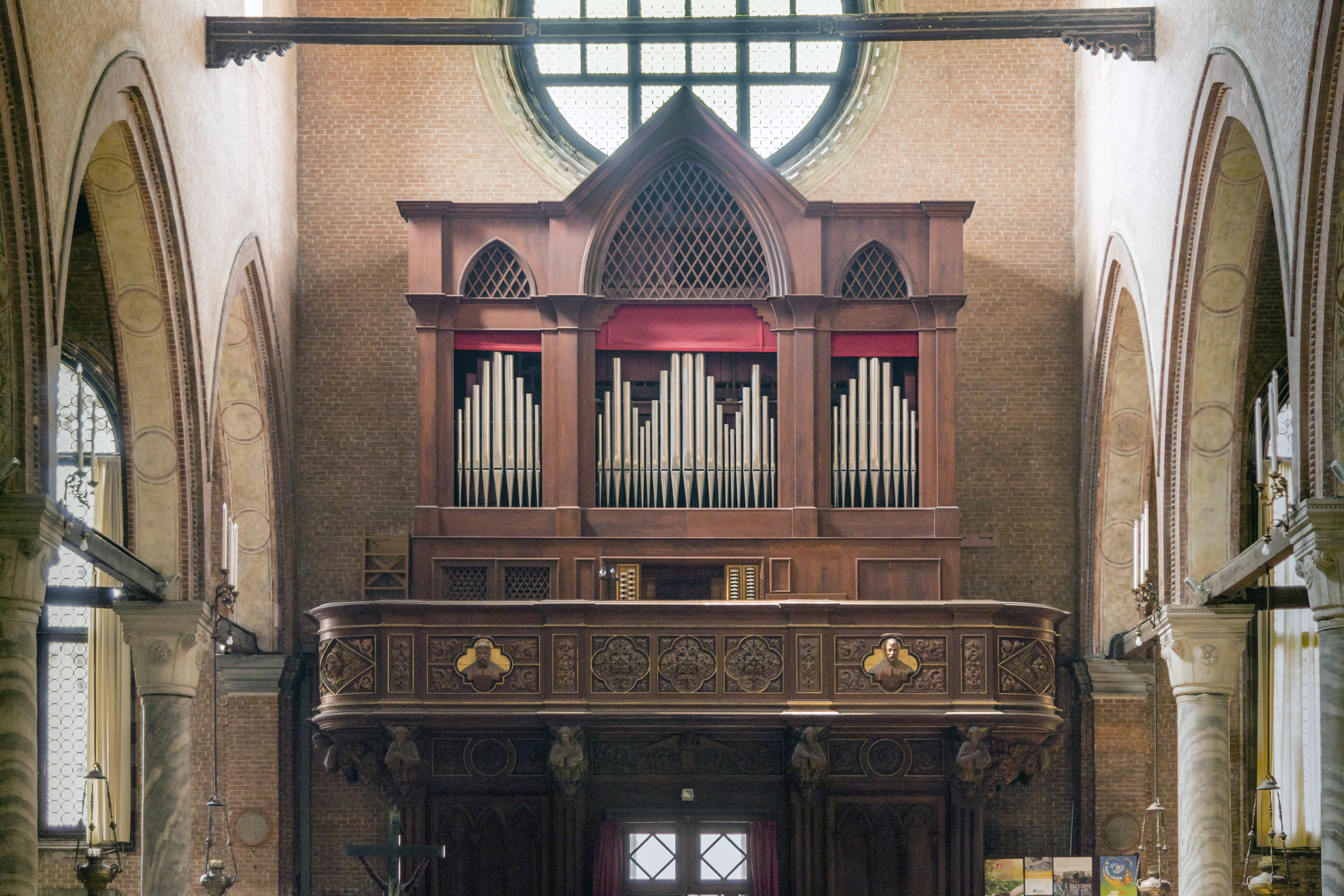
The organ over the entrance

The organ over the entrance was built in 1878, and is one of the most powerful in Venice.

=== Bell tower ===
The bell tower, in brickwork, was finished in 1503. It has a square plan, with pilasters strips on the sides leading to the cell with circular mullioned windows. Four semicircular tympani divided the cell from the upper cylindrical tambour with an onion dome in Eastern style.

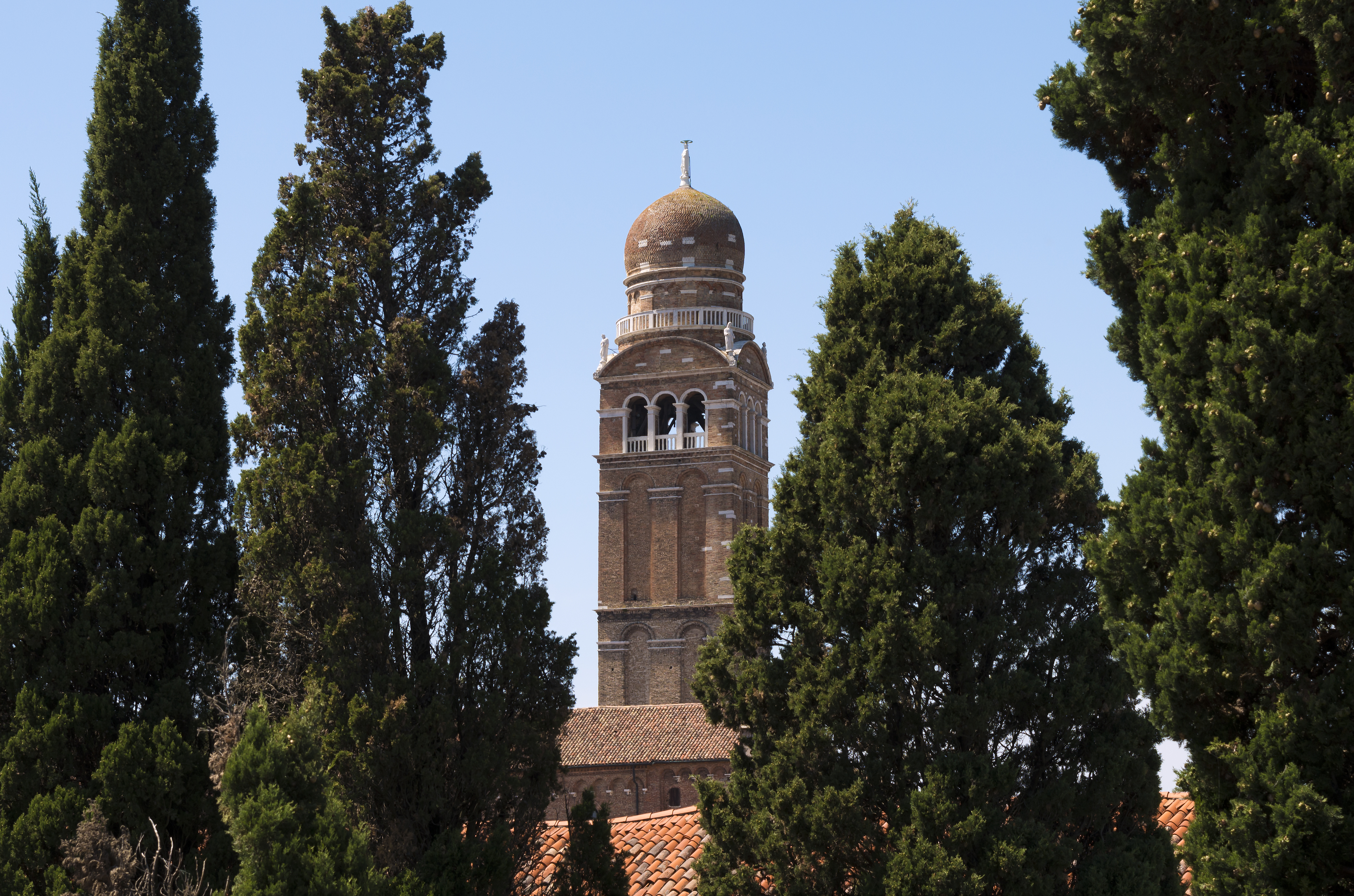
The bell tower

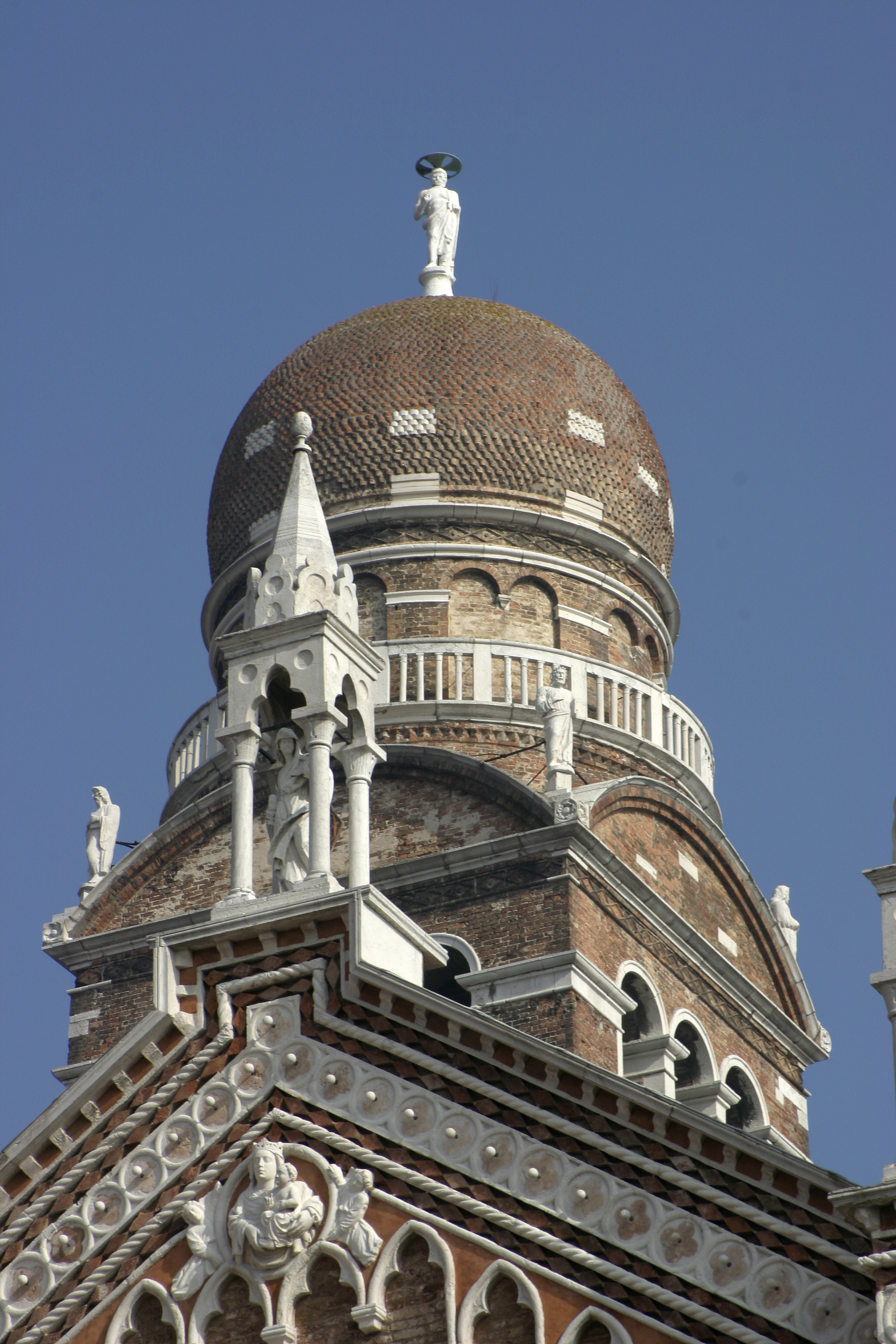
The bell tower

On the sides are four statues of Evangelists of Pietro Lombardo's school; on the summit is a statue of the Redeemer, in white marble. The old bells, the largest being from 1424, were replaced in 1883.

== Restorations ==
The church underwent three main restorations over the course of its existence.

In 1399 because of a problem with the North end foundations, a new façade was built and the interiors were redecorated. The building was then used as a stable, hay and wine store, and later as a powder magazine. A poor restoration was carried out in 1841 under Austrian rule, and in 1912 and 1930-31 there were attempts to reverse this Austrian intervention.

The most recent restoration was carried out following the 1966 flood, which greatly damaged the church. The side aisles were re-roofed and the old brickwork was replaced. The statues inside the church were cleaned and repaired, as well as the 19th century organ. The restoration works after the flood of 1966 and the new appearance of the building are described in the book Restoring Venice: The Church of the Madonna dell'Orto by Ashley Clarke and Philip Rylands.

== Recent Event ==
In June 2025, a wedding party for the marriage of Jeff Bezos and Lauren Sánchez was held in the adjacent cloisters.

== See also ==
- 16th-century Western domes
- Palazzo Benzi Zecchini, a 15th-century palace near the church, also known as "Benzi Zecchini all Madonna dell'Orto"
