= Marco Boschini =

Italian painter and engraver (1602–1681)

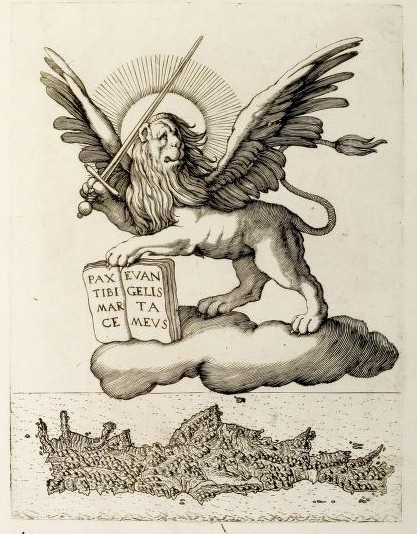
- Marco Boschini, from The Entire Kingdom of Candia, the winged Lion of St. Mark, symbol of the Republic of Venice above the island of Crete, 1651
- Born: 1602; Venice, Republic of Venice
- Died: 1 January 1681 (aged 78–79); Venice, Republic of Venice
- Occupations: painter, engraver, art historian
- Known for: La carta del navegar pitoresco

Marco Boschini (1602 – 1 January 1681) was an Italian painter, engraver and art historian of the early Baroque period in Venice.

== Biography ==
Marco Boschini was born in Venice, and was educated in the school of Palma il Giovane. He also studied engraving, with Odoardo Fialetti from Bologna. He painted The Last Supper for the sacristy of San Girolamo at Venice. He also distinguished himself as an engraver; for example, he engraved and tinted in aquaforte paintings of Bartolo Ceru.

Boschetti engraved also portraits, stage sets and maps (e.g. Il regno tutto di Candia, Venice, 1644; L’arcipelago con tutte le isole, Venice, 1658). His most original work consists of 25 inventions of imaginary paintings by such 17th-century Venetian artists as Pietro Liberi and Pietro della Vecchia, each with a descriptive poem attached.

Boschini was friendly with many painters, mostly Venetian, including Pietro Liberi, Nicolas Régnier, Pietro della Vecchia and Dario Varotari the Younger; he met Pietro da Cortona, Giuseppe Maria Mitelli and Velázquez on their visits to Venice.

As a writer on art, he was the author of several publications, such as La Carta del Navegar pittoresco (1660), a panygeric poem about Venetian painting; Le minere della pittura veneziana (1664) and Le ricche minere della pittura veneziana (1674), two city guides of Venice; and I gioieli pittoreschi (1676), the first guidebook to Vicenza.

As an art dealer, and in collaboration with della Vecchia and Paolo del Sera, Boschini encouraged the export of paintings, a practice that he had vigorously condemned in the ‘Breve instruzione’. His clients included Cardinal Leopoldo de' Medici and Alfonso IV d'Este. The Carta was dedicated to the voracious collector Leopold Wilhelm, Archduke of Austria, presumably as a business promotion.

== La carta del navegar pitoresco ==
Boschini's place in history rests firmly on the poem La carta del navegar pitoresco (Venice, 1660). It is an intensely patriotic and polemical defence of Venetian painting written in Venetian dialect and directed against those Roman and Tuscan standards represented by Giorgio Vasari. As the full title suggests, Boschini is enamoured with Giambattista Marino’s metaphoric language and frankly espouses a personal reading of art history from the perspective of an artist (he who ‘understands compasses’). The apparently unstructured exposition rejects objective, comprehensive and logically organized theories of art in favour of an eccentric art criticism that attempts to capture the immediacy and pleasure of vision itself.

In his argument against Vasari, Boschini rejected more than Tuscan artistic ideals, notably the classicizing standards of disegno (linear delineation, ancient statues and ideal proportions). He looked at paintings more with the artist's eye for formal problems than the humanist’s understanding of content. The ekphrastic tradition that emphasized narrative had little appeal for him; he revelled instead in the beauty of movement (only loosely attached to narrative) and in pure, sensuous form (what does the colouring taste like? what does the light sound like? what does the pigment feel like?). He also dismissed Vasari’s interest in the biographical component of art criticism as irrelevant to the image itself.

The Carta dominated Venetian art criticism into the 18th century and, despite the obstacles presented by the Venetian dialect, also prompted considerable comment throughout Italy, notably in the work of Filippo Baldinucci, Giovanni Pietro Bellori, Luigi Pellegrini Scaramuccia and Francesco Scipione Maffei.

== Other writings ==
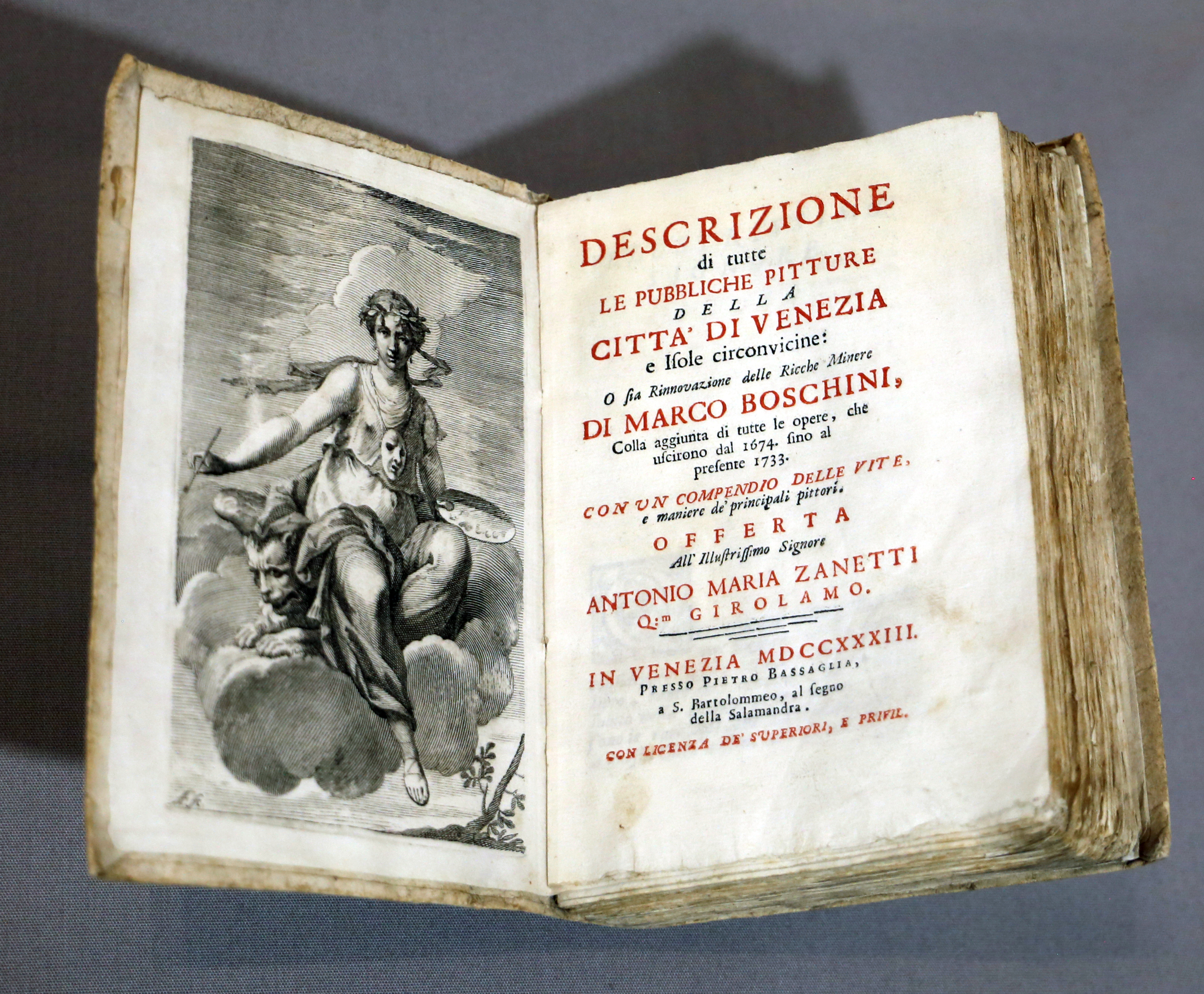
Second edition of Boschini's Le ricche minere della pittura veneziana edited by Anton Maria Zanetti, Venice, 1733

Boschini wrote a more accessible version of the Carta as an introduction to the second edition of his guidebook Le ricche minere della pittura veneziana (Venice, 1674; originally published in 1664). Although the title is still metaphorical (‘The rich mines of Venetian painting’), this book differs considerably in form and purpose from the Carta. It is much shorter, rendered into Tuscan, presumably for the tourist trade, and more clearly structured: a history of Venetian painting and a theoretical section divided into disegno, colorito and invenzione.

The new audience also encouraged Boschini to adopt a different, less polemical theme: ‘Brief instructions on how to understand the styles of Venetian painters’ is the heading to the introduction, indicating that Boschini's primary interest was connoisseurship. Hence the ‘Breve instruzione’ may be situated in a tradition started by Giulio Mancini and Abraham Bosse. Le ricche minere may not have been the first guidebook to painting in Venice but it was the most complete to date and served as the foundation for the later guides by Fioravante Martinelli, Antonio Maria Zanetti and Giambattista Albrizzi (1698–1777). It dealt only with paintings in public places; private galleries were to be covered in another book.

The major Venetian painters for which he has brief biographies in his text, and arranged in general chronologic order, are:

- Francesco Flore
- Jacobello Flore
- Carlo Crivelli
- Vivarini da Murano: Antonio, Giovanni, Bartolomeo, and Luigi or Alvise Vivarini.
- Bernardino da Murano
- Giovanni Buonconsigli (il Marescalco)
- Marco Basaiti
- Vittore Carpaccio
- Lazaro Sebastiani
- Giovanni Mansueti Viniziani
- Giovanni Bellini
- Gentile Bellini
- Giovanni Cima da Conegliano
- Christoforo Parmesse
- Bellin Bellino
- Vittore Belliniano
- Girolamo Santacroce
- Francesco Bissuola
- Vincenzio Catena
- Andrea Mantegna
- Il Civetta
- Il Frangipane
- Giorgione da Castelfranco
- Tiziano Vecellio
- Giovanni Antonio Licinio (Giovanni Antonio Regillo or il Pordenone)
- Jacopo Palma il Vecchio
- Lorenzo Lotto da Bergamo
- Giovambatista Morone
- Fra Sebastiano Del Piombo
- Francesco Vecellio
- Orazio Vecellio
- Marco Vecellio
- Polidoro Viniziano
- Lorenzino di Tiziano
- Girolamo di Tiziano
- Santo Zago
- Bonifacio Viniziano
- Damiano Mazza
- Paris Bordone
- Giovanni Contarini
- Alessandro Varottari
- Giuseppe Porta
- Andrea Schiavone
- Jacopo da Ponte, also called Il Bassano
- Francesco Bassano the Younger
- Leandro Bassano
- Batista da Ponte
- Girolamo da Ponte
- Jacopo Robusti (Tintoretto)
- Domenico Tintoretto
- Marietta Robusti
- Paolo Franceschi also called il Fiamingo Franceschi
- Giovanni Rothamer da Monaco
- Cesare Dalle Ninfe Viniziano
- Paolo Caliari (Paolo Veronese)
- Benedetto Caliari
- Carletto Caliari
- Gabriello Caliari
- Alvise Benfatto (Alvise Dal Friso)
- Francesco Montemezzano
- Maffeo Verona
- Giovambatista Zilotti
- Jacopo Palma il Giovine
- Leonardo Corona
- Girolamo Gambarato
- Antonio Vassilachi (Il Aliense)
- Andrea Vicentino
- Santo Peranda
- Pietro Malombra
- Girolamo Pilotti
- Matteo Ingoli
- Tiberio Tinelli
- Parrasio Michele
- Pietro Damini
- Fra Cosimo
- Pietro Liberi
- Pietro Vecchia
- Carl Loth
- Luca Giordano
- Federico Cervelli
- Francesco Ruschi
- Antonio Zanchi
- Giulio Carpioni
- Andrea Celesti
- Antonio Fumiani
- Antonio Molinari
- Giovanni Segalla
- Gregorio Lazarini
- Luca Carlevari
- Marco Ricci
- Sebastiano Ricci
- Antonio Balestra
- Nicolo Bambini
- Matteo Bortoloni
- Girolamo Brusaferro
- Antonio Canale
- Rosalba Carriera
- Alessandro Marchesini
- Giovambatista Mariotti
- Bartolommeo Nazari
- Santo Piatti
- Giovambatista Piazzetta
- Antonio Pellegrini
- Giovambatista Pittoni
- Francesco Polazzi
- Giovambatista Tiepolo
- Angelo Trivisani

== Bibliography ==
- Bryan, Michael (1886). Robert Edmund Graves (ed.). Dictionary of Painters and Engravers, Biographical and Critical. Vol. I A-K. London: George Bell and Sons. p. 161.
- Sohm, Philip (1991). Pittoresco. Marco Boschini, His Critics, and Their Critiques of Painterly Brush- work in Seventeenth- and Eighteenth-Century Italy. Cambridge: Cambridge University Press.
- De Boer, Waldemar H. (2008). Marco Boschini, I gioieli pittoreschi. Virtuoso ornamento della città di Vicenza (1676). Edizione critica illustrata con annotazioni. Florence, Italy: Centro Di.
- Wasmer, Marc-Joachim (2009), Marco Boschini, "Breve Instruzione". Eine stilkritische Einführung in "Le ricche minere della pittura veneziana". Italienisch-Deutsche Edition, 2 Bde., Diss. Universität Bern, 1994, Bern: Selbstverlag.
