= Fiammingo =

Fiammingo was a name given by Italians to (mainly) Flemish painters, and may refer to:

- Arrigo Fiammingo, real name Hendrick van den Broeck
- Cornelio Fiammingo, real name Cornelis Cort
- Enrico Fiammingo, real name Hendrick de Somer
- Giovanni Fiammingo, real name Jan van Calcar
- Guglielmo Fiammingo, real name Willem Danielsz van Tetrode
- Il Fiammingo may refer to François Duquesnoy or to Denis Calvaert
- Michele Fiammingo, real name Michele Desubleo
- Rinaldo Fiammingo, real name Aert Mijtens
