= Daniel van den Dyck =

Flemish painter

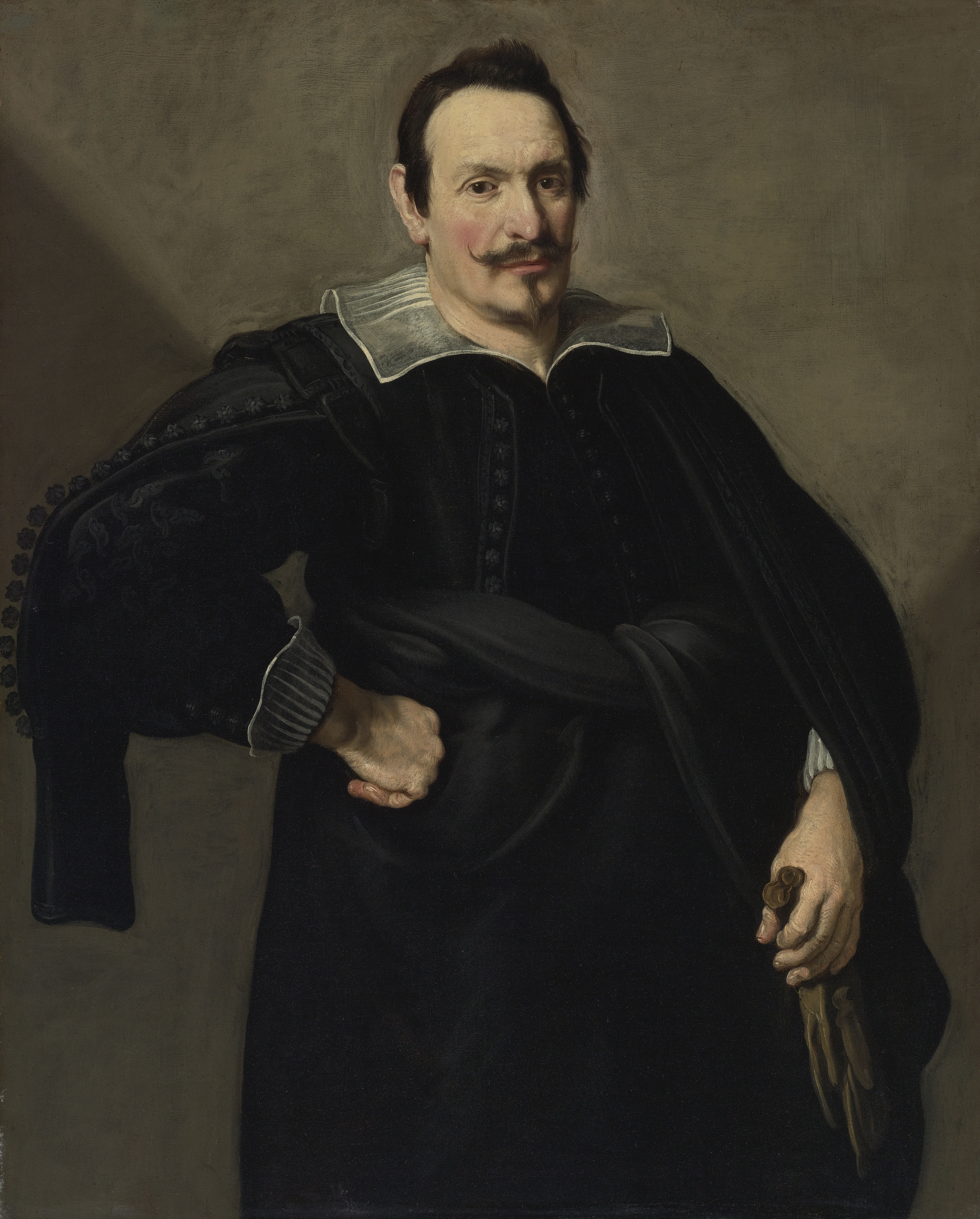
Portrait of a nobleman

Daniel van den Dyck, known in Italy as Daniel Vandich (baptized on 3 December 1614, Antwerp – 1663, Mantua) was a Flemish painter, printmaker, architect and engineer. After training in Antwerp he left for Italy where he first worked in Venice and later became a court painter in Mantua. He was a versatile artist who created mythological and religious scenes, as well as portraits and flower-pieces.

== Life ==
Very little is known about the early life of Daniel van den Dyck. He was born in Antwerp as the son of Jan van den Dyck and Cornelia Kerstboom. He was baptized in Antwerp Cathedral on 3 December 1614. He was registered as a pupil of Peter Verhaeght in the Antwerp Guild of Saint Luke in the guild year 1631–1632. He was registered as a master of the Antwerp Guild of Saint Luke in the guild year 1633–1634. It is assumed that shortly after becoming a master he left Antwerp as he was not involved in any of the large commissions on which Antwerp painters worked in the middle of the 1630s such as the decorations for the Joyous Entry into Antwerp of the new governor of the Habsburg Netherlands Cardinal-Infante Ferdinand and the decorations for the hunting pavilion Torre de la Parada of the Spanish king Philip IV near Madrid.

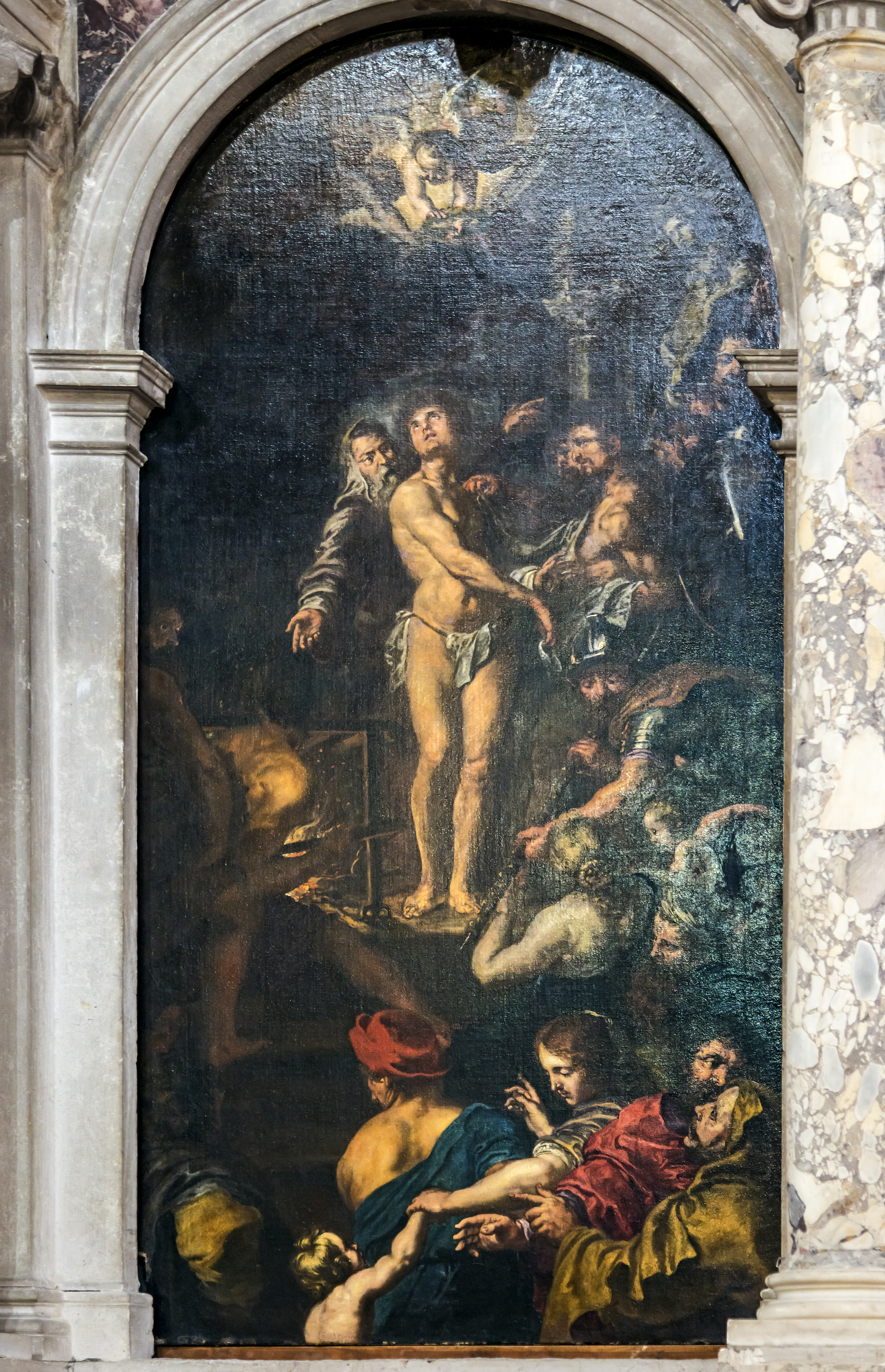
Martyrdom of St. Lawrence

The artist passed first through Bergamo where he created a few signed and dated portraits. He was in Venice likely from 1634 onwards. Here he married Lucrezia Renieri, the eldest daughter of Nicolas Régnier, a Flemish painter active in Venice who was herself a painter. The couple had three sons. His father-in-law had been active in Venice since 1626 not only as a painter but also as an art dealer and art collector. Clorinda, the younger sister of van den Dyck's wife was married to the prominent Italian painter Pietro della Vecchia (1605–1678). These family ties meant that van den Dyck could rely on a network of Flemish and Italian artists in Venice. This allowed him to gain many commissions for religious paintings in churches as well as for portraits. He painted wall decorations in the Palazzo Pesaro in Preganziol together with his brother-in-law della Vecchia and their respective spouses.

Evidence of the esteem in which he was held in his time is the fact that one of his works - a portrait - was included in the early biographer Carlo Ridolfi's book on Venetian painters of 1648 entitled Le maraviglie dell'Arte ovvero, Le vite degli Illustri Pittori Veneti and dello Stato. He was also praised by Marco Boschini in his La carta del navegar pitoresco of 1660, a panygeric poem about Venetian painting. Boschini dedicated two pages to van den Dyck and represented the artist in a print as Jupiter embellishing Virtue with a royal mantle.

Giovan Francesco Loredano, one of the founders of the Accademia degli Incogniti, a learned society of freethinking intellectuals established in 1630 in Venice, often ordered the illustrations for his multiple writings from van den Dyck, Pietro della Vecchia and Francesco Ruschi. One of these prints was a portrait of Loredano which he made for Loredano's Opere (Collected works).

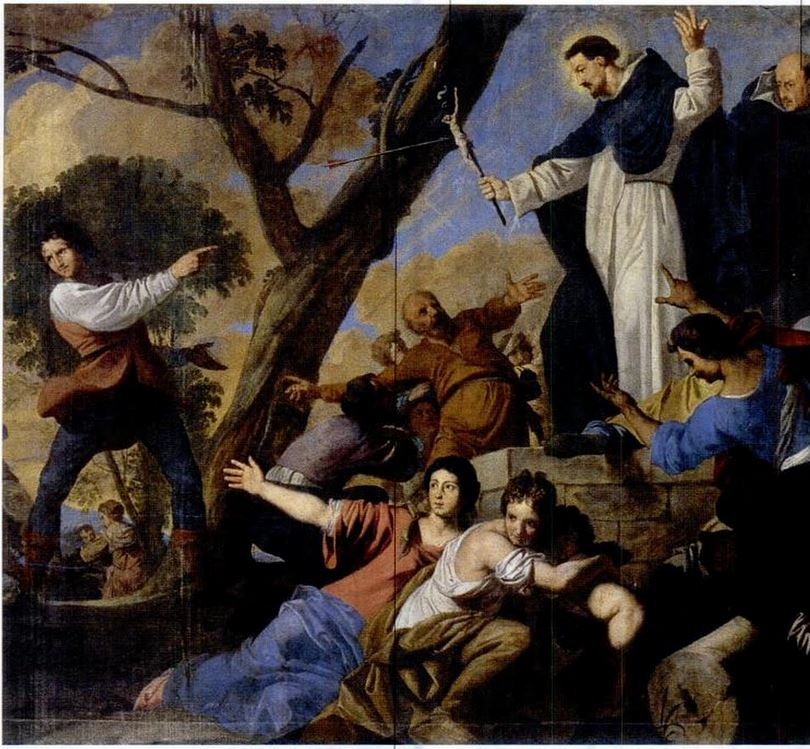
St Dominic accompanied by Simon de Montfort raising the crucifix against the Albigensians

From late 1657 van den Dyck was living with his family in Mantua. On 2 April of the next year he was named by duke Carlo II Gonzaga as his official court painter, architect, surveyor of his building program and engineer for stage designs for the theatre. He also was made the superintendent of the duke's gallery and tasked with reconstituting the ducal art collection which had become dispersed during the previous two dukes' reign. Possibly his appointment was made on the recommendation of his father-in-law who had provided services to the duke on various occasions. As the prefetto delle fabbriche (surveyor of works) van den Dyck had to move between the various construction sites such as Maderno, Marmirolo, Mantua and Venice, to check the transportation of the many marble statues, inspect the progress and quality of the various construction works undertaken at the ducal palace as well as the suburban residences, ordered supplies and tools, organized the daily assignments of the workers and made sure the duke was informed timely through frequent correspondence. The constant and exhausting travel in this role did not allow van den Dyck to work as a painter, the premier reason for his appointment to the court. This may explain why van den Dyck operated a large workshop with assistants. These assistants would produce his works which he would then 'touch up'.

The date of his death is not known with certainty. It is placed shortly after he drew up his will on 27 June 1662. On 4 April 1663 the duke of Mantua appointed another Flemish painter called Frans Geffels as his new court painter. Van den Dyck's son may have become a painter as his grandfather Nicolas Régnier bequeathed onto him all his prints, drawings and reliefs to study.

== Work ==
Daniel van den Dyck was a versatile artist who created mythological and religious scenes, as well as portraits and flower-pieces. He also created prints after his own designs. He often signed his works by his Italian name 'Daniele vanden Dyck'. Very few of his works have survived or been identified with certainty.

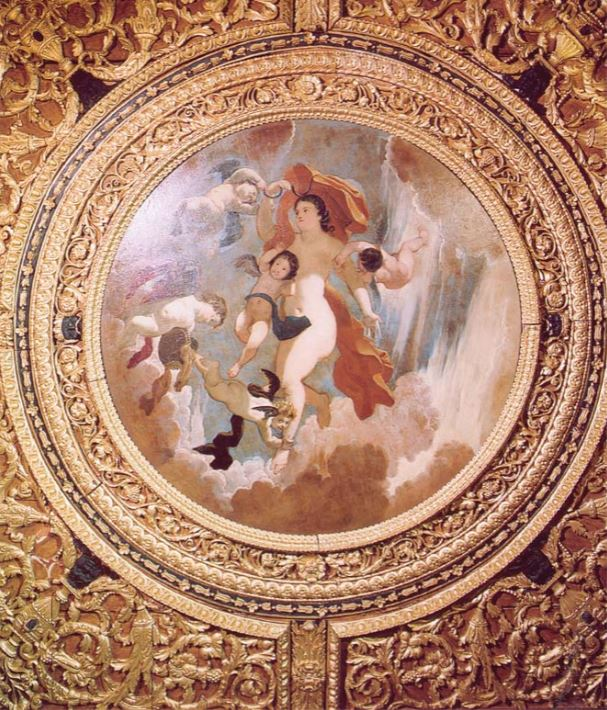
Venus and Cupids

One of his key works, a Martyrdom of St. Lawrence hangs in the Church of Madonna dell'Orto in Venice, which was frequented by the Flemish community residing in the Republic. This work shows the influence of Rubens in its sensuality and that of Anthony van Dyck in the livid tonality and the smooth and thin application of the paint. He is known to have created more altarpieces as well as portraits during his stay in Venice. Marco Boschini mentions in his Le ricche minere della pittura veneziana of 1674 a Portrait of three lawyers including Giovan Francesco Loredano (still alive) by van den Dyck as being kept at the Doge's Palace in Venice.

Van den Dyck is also believed to have painted the frescos on the subject of Psyche in the "Villa Venier Contarini" in Mira, Veneto.

A number of portraits have been attributed to van den Dyck. His portrait style retains a Flemish painterly quality derived from his early training in Antwerp. His early style is also close to that of other painters active in Bergamo or Mantua such as Carlo Ceresa and Domenico Fetti to whom some of his portraits have been erroneously attributed in the past and vice versa. Already in his lifetime the liveliness of his portraits was praised. His portraiture is characterized by his ability to analyze reality, describe the physiognomic features of the character, without neglecting psychological analysis.

Van den Dyck painted 13 flower pieces for the duke of Mantua's Gabinetto. These works are considered lost.

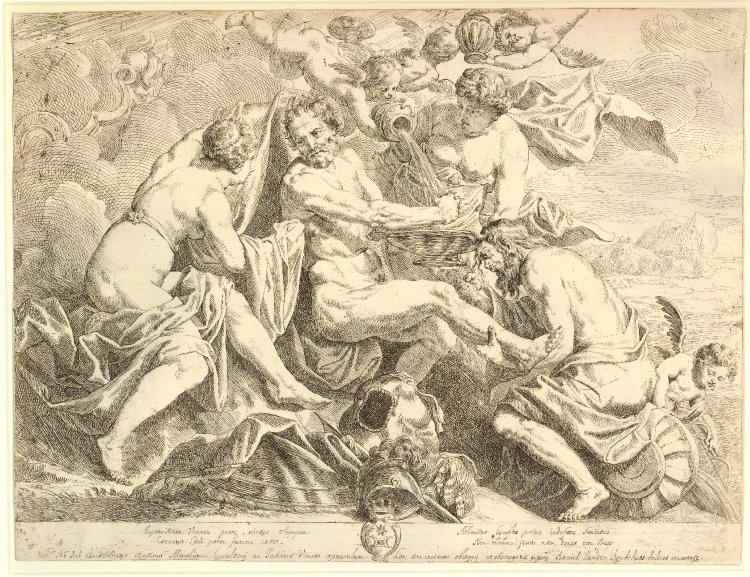
Deification of Aeneas by nymphs and cupids

His graphic work is mainly distinguished by its cursive and quick character, which predates developments in the 17th century. This is quite evident in his Deification of Aeneas by nymphs and cupids, which likely dates from his Mantuan period. This work shows the classicist influences of Giulio Romano as well as the Flemish Baroque with its muscular and bearded hero Aeneas who is being submitted by the robust nymphs to a grooming before his elevation to godly status. His print of a Bacchanal on the other hand shows the possible influence of Giovanni Benedetto Castiglione who was also active in Mantua. A preliminary study for this print is kept at the British Museum. The heavy use of the brush and the painterly quality of the landscape in the drawing also show a closeness to Castiglione.
