= Benfatto =

Benfatto is a surname. Notable people with the surname include:

- Attilio Benfatto (1943–2017), Italian cyclist
- Luigi Benfatto (1551–1611), Italian painter
- Marco Benfatto (born 1988), Italian racing cyclist
