= Bartolo Ceru =

Italian painter (died c. 1660)

Bartolo Ceru (active Venice, died circa 1660) was an Italian painter, mainly of quadratura. He trained under Maffeo Verona. Some of his paintings were engraved and tinted in aquaforte by Marco Boschini.
