= Girolamo di Tiziano =

Italian painter

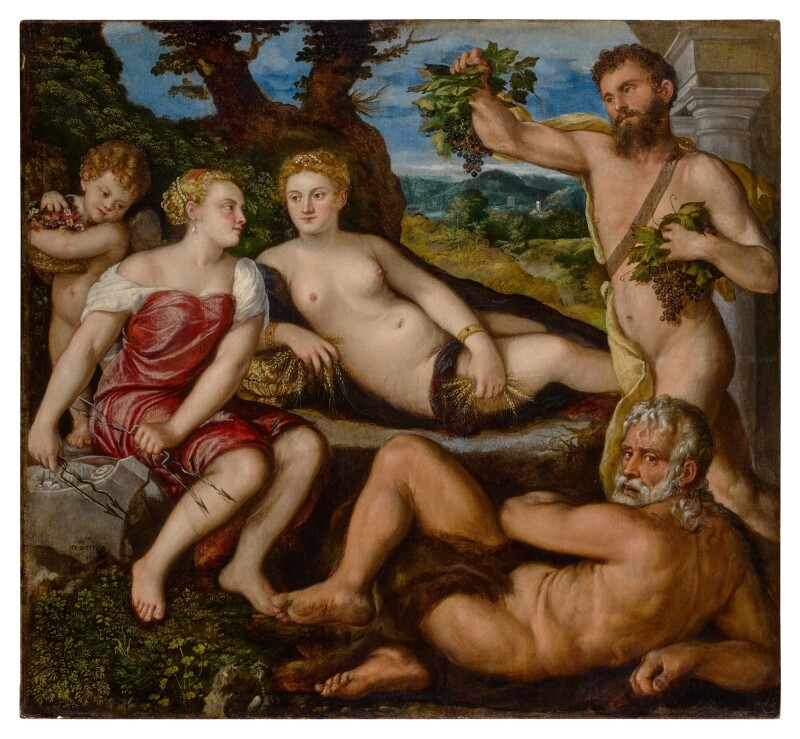
Allegory of the Four Seasons

Girolamo di Tiziano was an Italian painter. He got his name from having been a scholar of Titian and an assistant to him in some of his less important works, and is also known as Girolamo Dante or Girolamo Dente. He flourished at Venice from 1550 to 1580. It is said that in copying the originals of his master, he attained so high a degree of excellence, that such of his pieces as were retouched by Titian, bid defiance often to the judgment of the most expert connoisseurs. He also produced works of his own design; the altar-piece attributed to him at San Giovanni Nuovo, representing SS. Cosmo and Damianus, reflects credit on the school to which he belonged.

He was born and died in Ceneda. An Adoration by the Magi is found in the Museo Civico of Feltri.
