= Benedetto Caliari =

Italian painter (1538–1598)

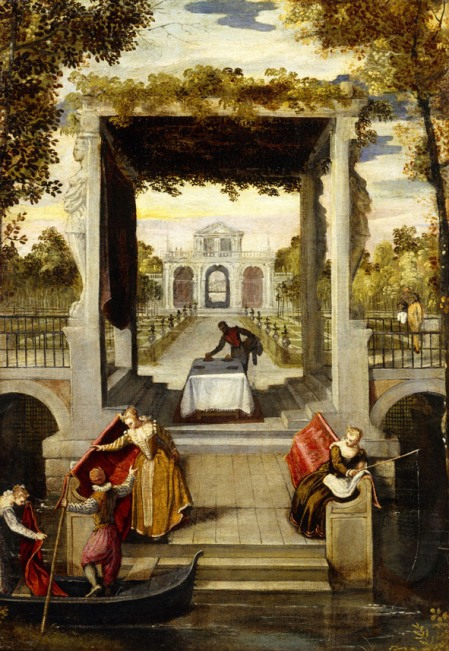
Garden in a Venician Villa, painting by Benedetto Caliari, 1570–1580, Academia Carrara (Bérgamo

Benedetto Caliari (1538–1598) was an Italian painter who was born into a family of artists. Benedetto's father Gabriele Caliari was a stonecutter. Benedetto's brother Paolo Caliari was the renowned painter Veronese.

== Life ==
Veronese's principal assistants were his younger brother Benedetto Caliari and his two sons Carlo or Carletto Caliari (1570–1596) and Gabriele Caliari (1568–1631). Benedetto Caliari, who was about ten years younger than Veronese, is reputed to have had a very large share in the architectural backgrounds that form so conspicuous a feature in Veronese's compositions. After Veronese's death in 1588, Benedetto, Carlo and Gabriele completed his unfinished paintings. They often signed collectively as Paolo's heirs.

The Accademia Carrara (Bérgamo, Italy), the Cleveland Museum of Art, the Hermitage Museum, the Honolulu Museum of Art, Kunsthistorisches Museum (Vienna) and Musée des Beaux-Arts de Caen are among the public collections holding works by Benedetto Caliari.

== Gallery ==
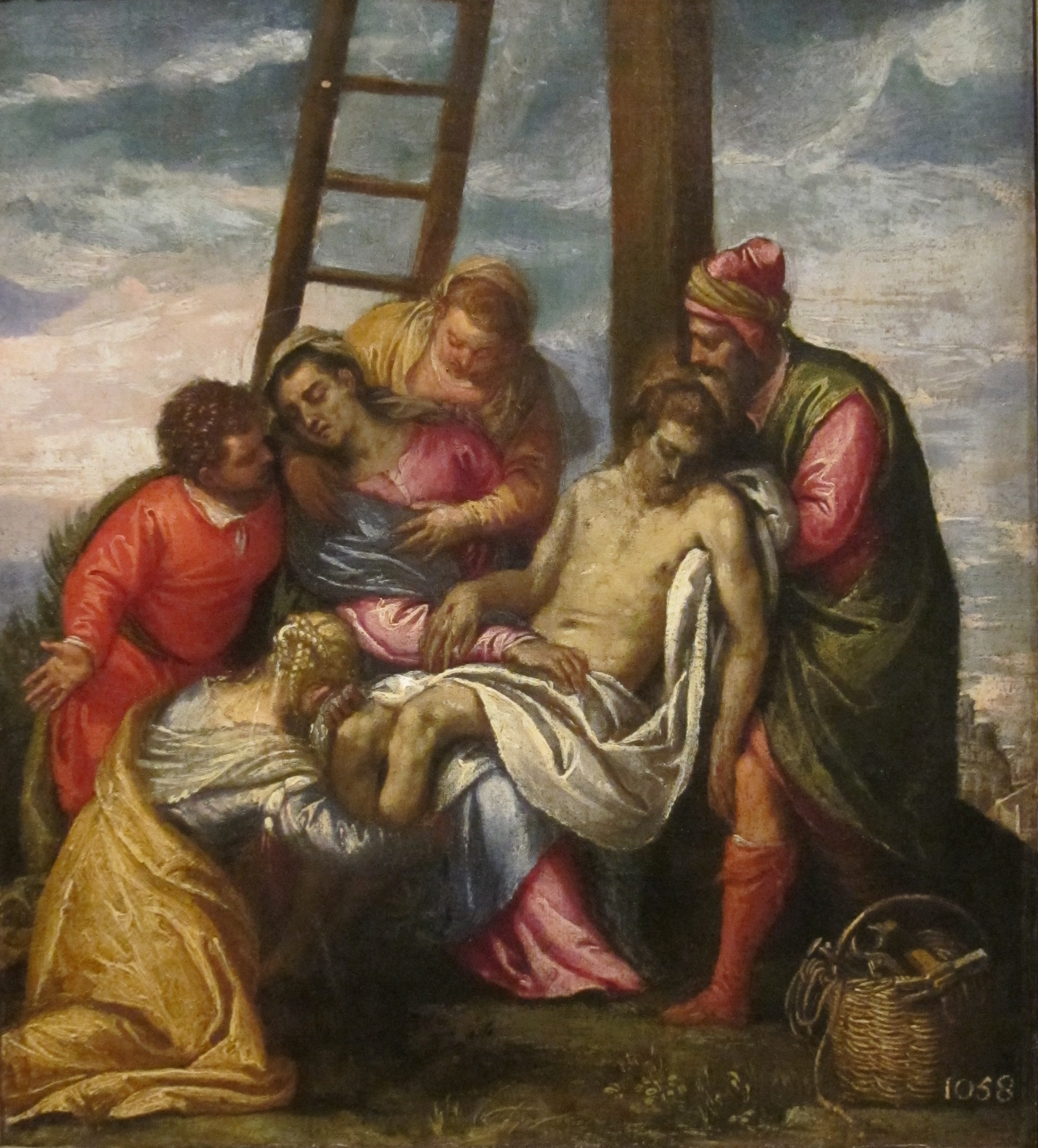
The Deposition of Christ, painting by Benedetto Caliari, c. 1577, Honolulu Museum of Art

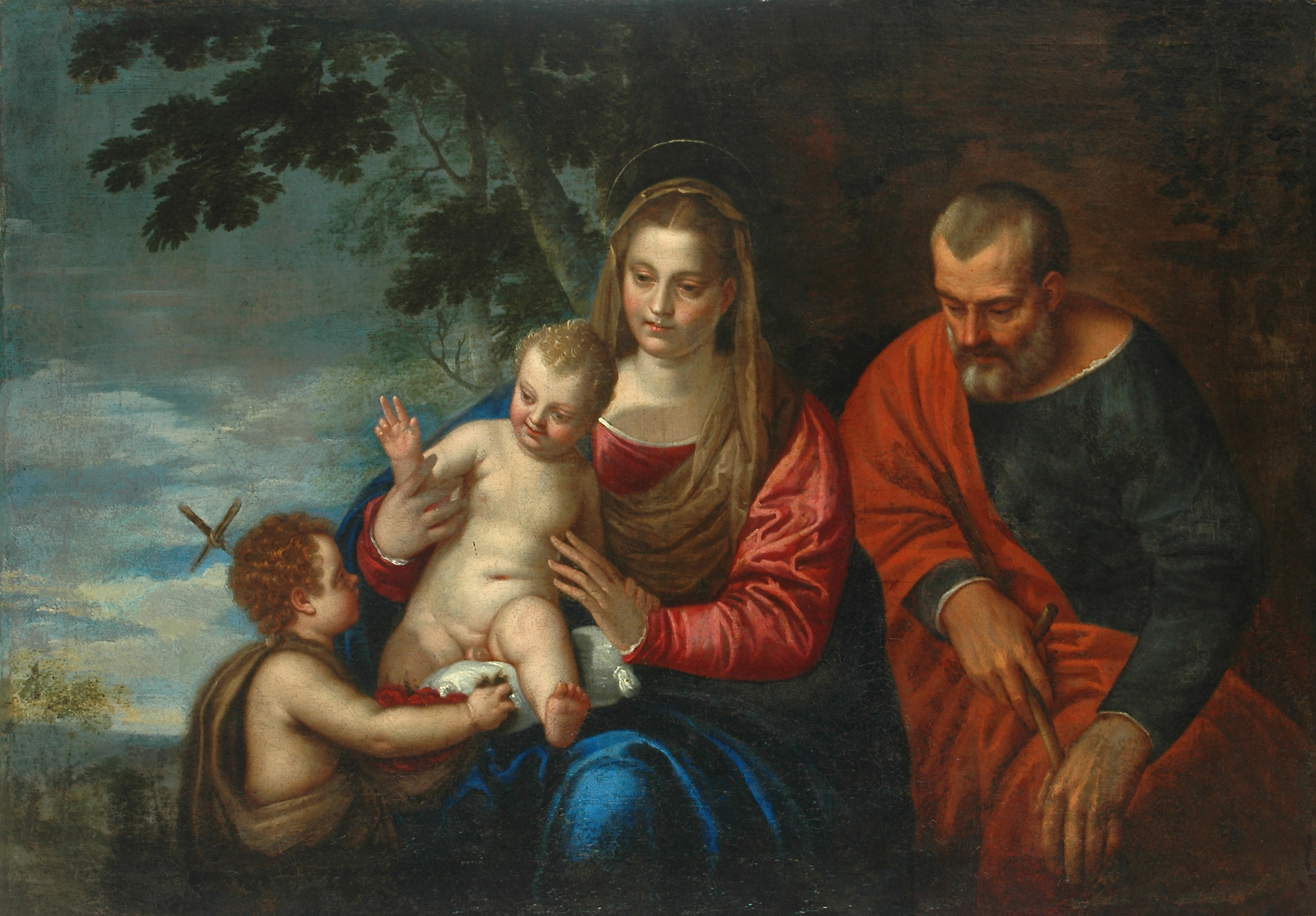
Holy Family with St. John the Baptist, painting by Benedetto Caliari, 1580–1590, Museum of King John III's Palace at Wilanów, Warsaw

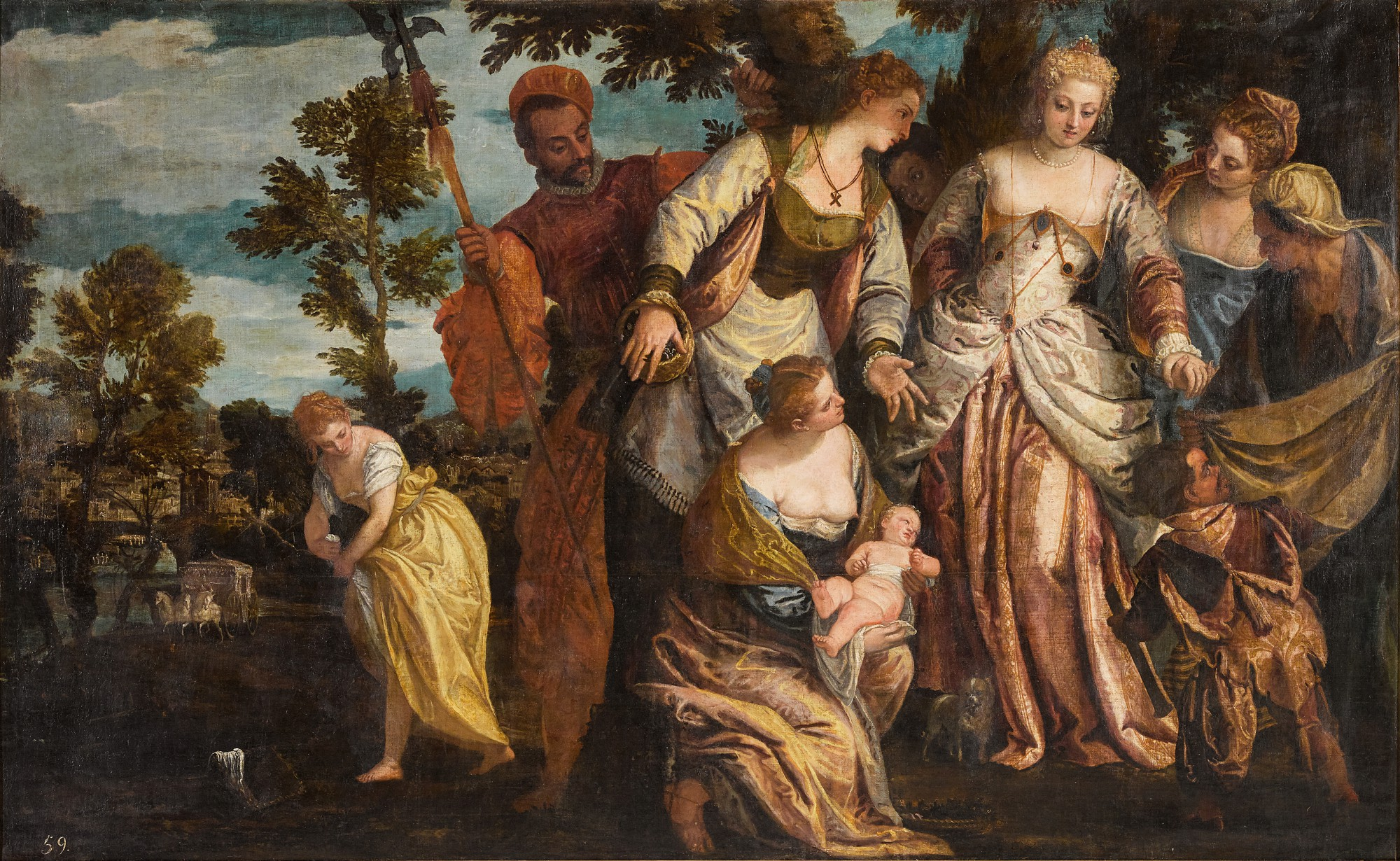
"The Finding of Moses", painting by Benedetto Caliari, Private Collection.

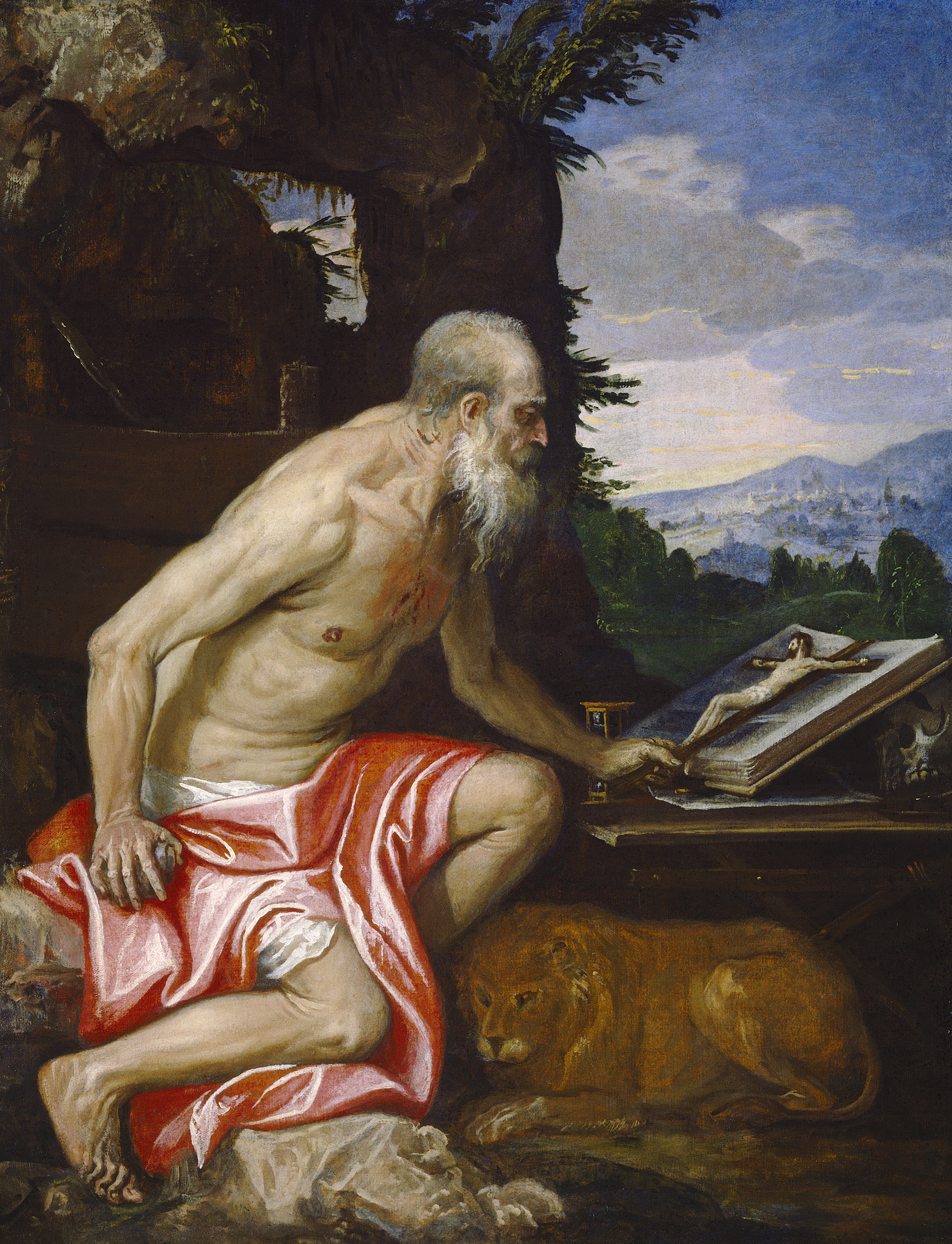
Saint Jerome in the Wilderness, painting by Veronese Workshop, possibly Benedetto Caliari, 1575–1585, National Gallery of Art, Washington, D.C.
