= Vanity (Régnier) =

Painting by Nicolas Régnier

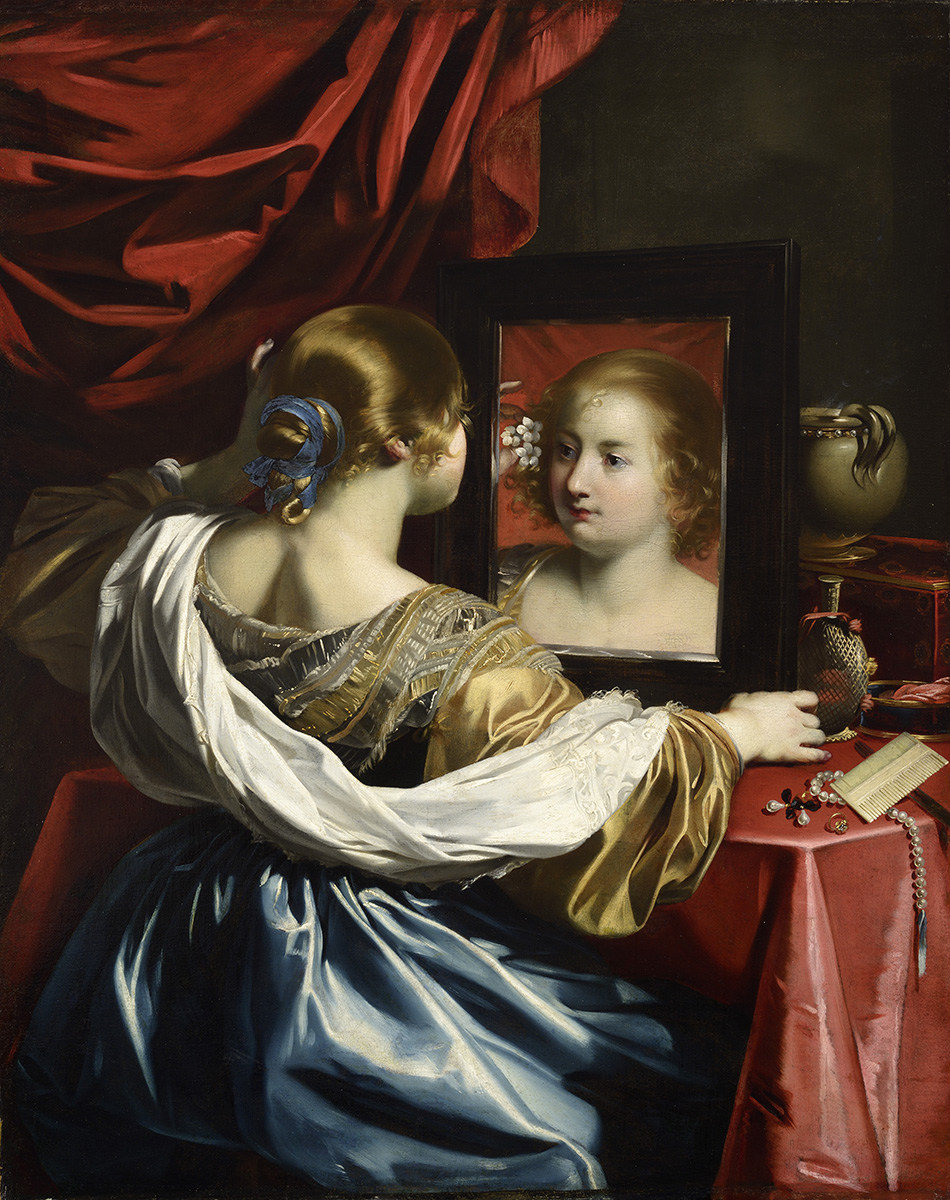
Vanity (c. 1630–1635) by Nicolas Régnier

Vanity or Young Woman at her Toilette is a c.1630-1635 oil on canvas painting by the French artist Nicolas Régnier. It has been in the collection of the Museum of Fine Arts of Lyon since 1976.
