= Feltri =

Feltri is a surname. Notable people with the surname include:

- M. Laura Feltri (1963–2023), Italian-American biochemist and neurologist
- Thiago Feltri (born 1985), Brazilian footballer
- Vittorio Feltri (born 1943), Italian journalist
