= Pietro della Vecchia =

Venetian painter (1603–1678)

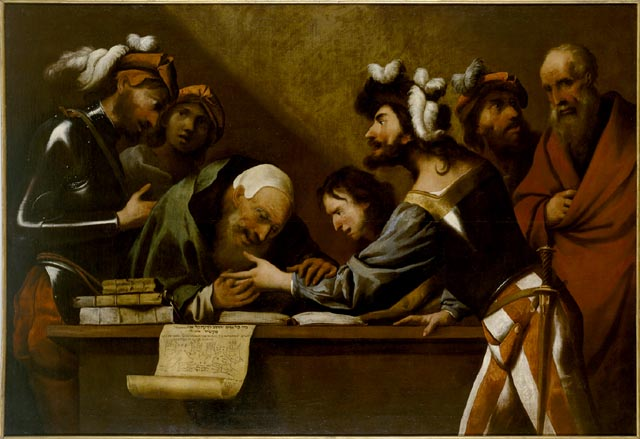
The fortune teller

Pietro della Vecchia, Pietro della Vècchia or Pietro Vècchia, formerly incorrectly called Pietro Muttoni (1603 – 8 September 1678) was a versatile Venetian artist between late Mannerism and early Baroque, who worked in many genres and created altarpieces, portraits, genre scenes and grotesques. He also created pastiches of the work of leading Italian painters of the 16th century. He designed cartoons for mosaics and worked as an art restorer. Della Vecchia was also sought after as an art expert and did expert valuations of artworks. He worked most of his life in Venice and its environs except for a brief stay in Rome.

== Life ==
The life of Pietro della Vecchia is not very well documented and the information available is not always reliable. He is believed to have been born in Vicenza in 1603 as the son of Gasparo della Vecchia, who was a painter admitted to the Venetian painters' guild. Some art historians place the artist's place of birth in Venice. Pietro della Vecchia was erroneously called Pietro Muttoni after Luigi Lanzi in the first edition of his Storia pittorica della Italia (1796), mixed up the artist's name with that of a Muttoni collection, which kept one of his paintings. Later authors interpreted de la Vecchia (meaning 'of the old') as a nickname as the artist liked to imitate the old masters of the previous century. Pietro was in fact a scion of a well-known Venetian family called 'Dalla Vecchia'.

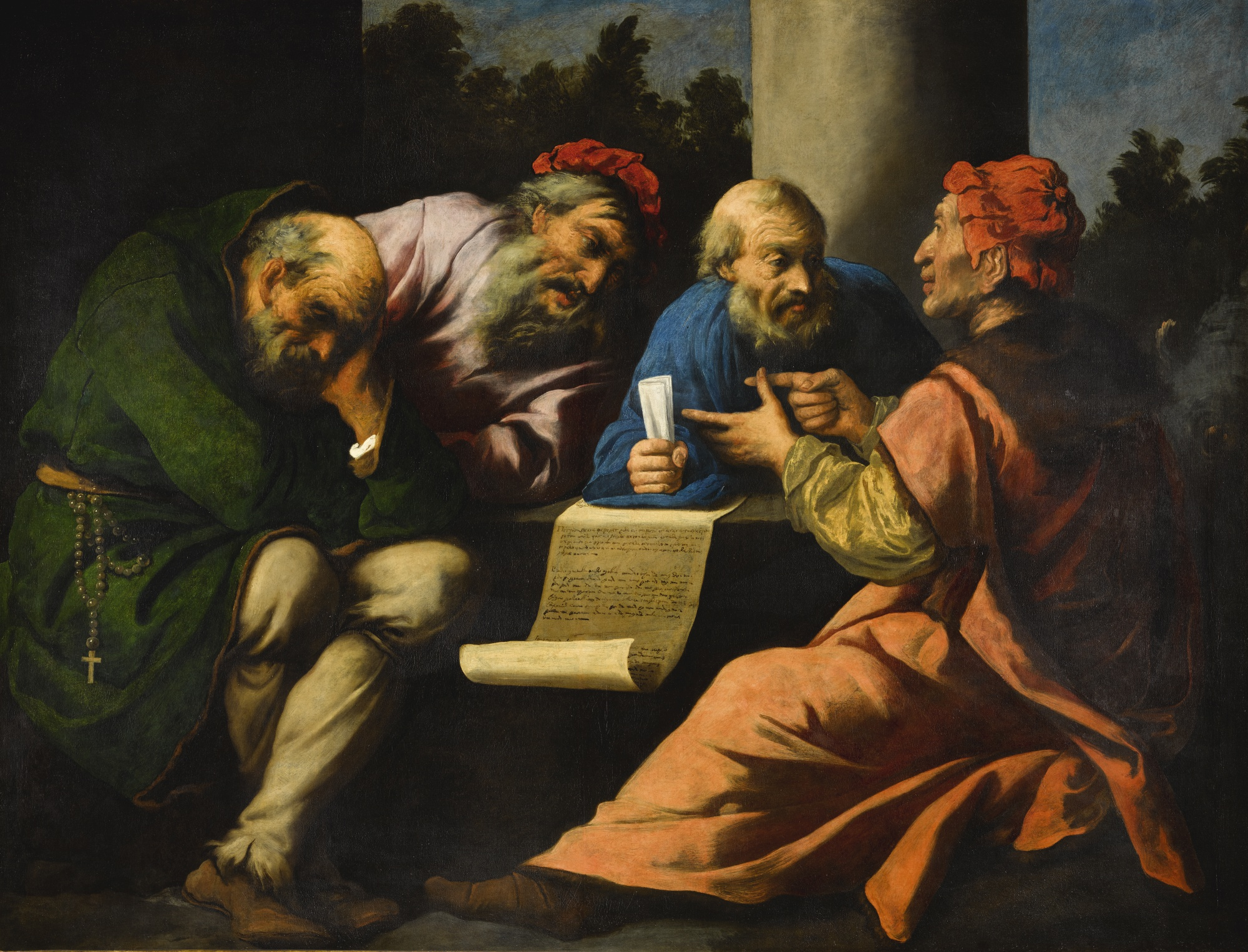
A dispute among the doctors

Early sources describe Alessandro Varotari, called il Padovanino, as his teacher. On stylistic grounds some art historians have expressed doubt on this traineeship in his early years. The influence of the works of Padovanino is only visible after 1635. So he may have worked with Padovanino at a later stage. His earliest known work show a strong influence by Carlo Saraceni and Saraceni's pupil and collaborator Jean Leclerc. This is an important indication that della Vecchia trained with them. As his work displayed for some time certain Caravaggesque characteristics it is believed that he spent time in Rome after the departure of Leclerc from Venice in 1621 or 1622. Della Vecchia probably worked in Padovanino's workshop after his return from Rome in 1625 or 1626. Padovanino, whose style was strongly rooted in early-16th-century Venetian art, likely played an important role in instilling in della Vecchia a great interest in 16th-century painting in Venice and the Veneto.

The first documents in which the name of della Vecchia appears date back to the period from December 1626 to January 1628. The documents deal with the payment for a banner the artist had made for the Confraternity of the Carmelites in the church of S. Marco in Pordenone. From 1629 to 1640 he was a member of the guild of painters in Venice. In 1649 he married Clorinda Régnier (or Clorinda Renieri), a daughter of the Flemish painter Nicolas Régnier (or Renieri). It has previously been believed that he married her in 1626 but the recent finding of their marriage license and Clorinda's testament by Annick Lemoine who specializes in the life of Nicolas Régnier reveals that they got married in 1649 and Clorinda was actually born around 1629. Clorinda Régnier was a painter in her own right and has been described as "a woman of great spirit, of great stature and of great adherence" (Tommaso Temanza, 1738). Lucrezia Régnier, the elder sister of della Vecchia's wife was married to Daniel van den Dyck, a Flemish painter active in Northern Italy. Della Vecchia, together with his brother-in-law Daniel van den Dyck and their respective spouses, painted wall decorations in the Palazzo Pesaro in Preganziol.

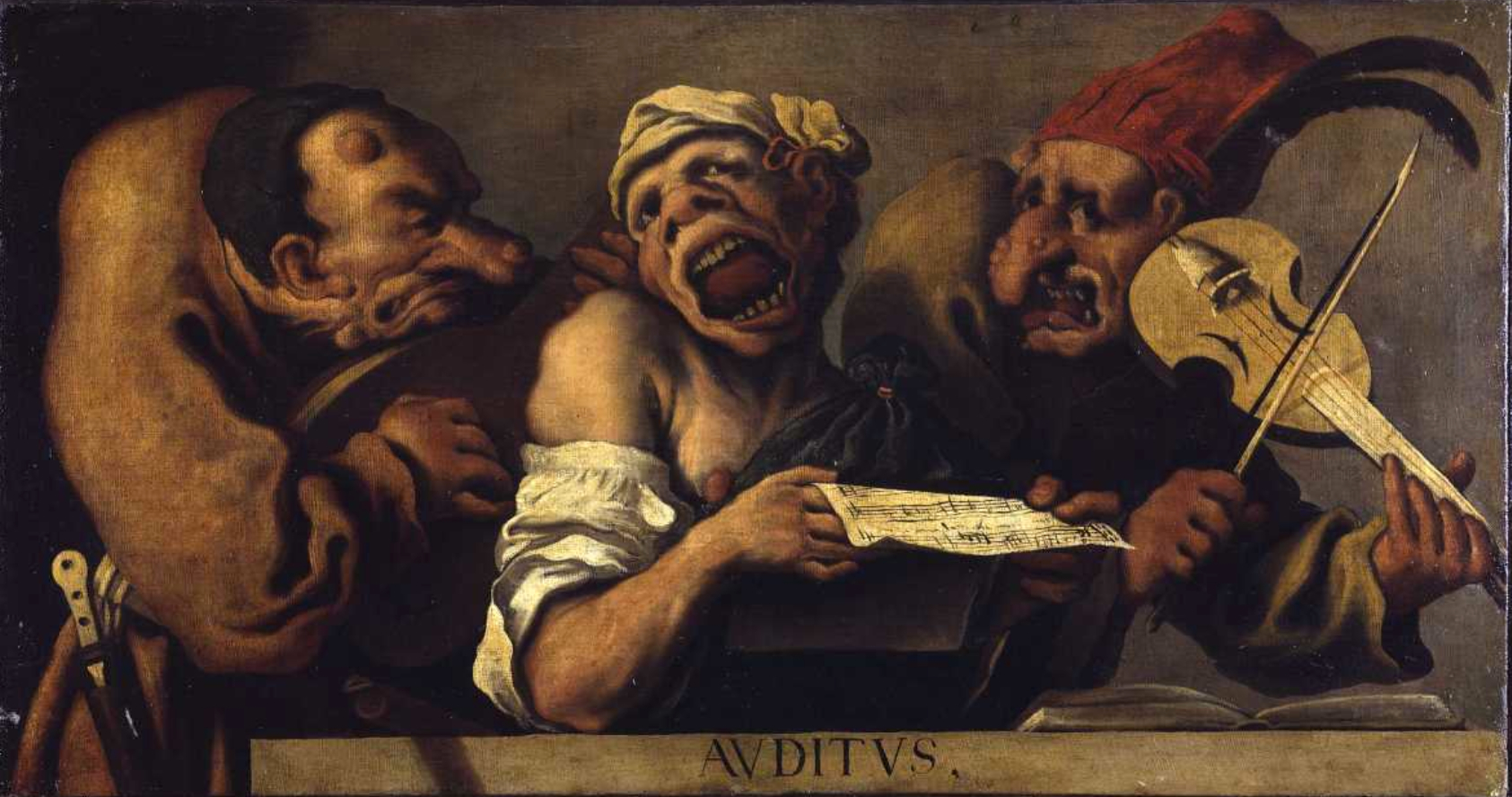
Allegory of hearing

Towards the end of the 1630s della Vecchia had established his name as one of the leading painters of Venice, especially of religious works. In January 1640 the procurators of S. Marco de Supra, responsible for the decoration of St Mark's Basilica, commissioned from him two cartoons for mosaics. These appear to have been well received as della Vecchia was subsequently appointed Venice's "pitor ducal" (painter to the duke), a position he held until 1674, that is, until four years before his death. In this capacity he was responsible for the design of the new mosaics and the restoration of the old ones in the Basilica. Della Vecchia also received a commission to restore Giorgione's Castelfranco Madonna altarpiece in 1643-1644.

At the height of his career, della Vecchia was a very sought-after teacher with a large workshop employing many assistants. Della Vecchia also opened an academy in his house where live drawing classes were organised. Gregorio Lazzarini was one of his pupils probably shortly after 1667. Gregorio Lazzarini was later the teacher of Giovanni Battista Tiepolo. Della Vecchia also taught classes on the theory of art.

Della Vecchia enjoyed fame as a connoisseur of ancient drawings and paintings. Especially during the latter part of his life he was repeatedly consulted by collectors and merchants, often together with his father-in-law Nicolas Régnier. Both he and his father-in-law had business relations with Paolo del Sera, who was the art agent in Venice of Leopoldo de' Medici, an Italian cardinal, scholar, patron of the arts and the Governor of Siena. Marco Boschini, an engraver, art dealer and author who was a great admirer of della Vecchia, often joined the artist when he was asked to value paintings after 1670.

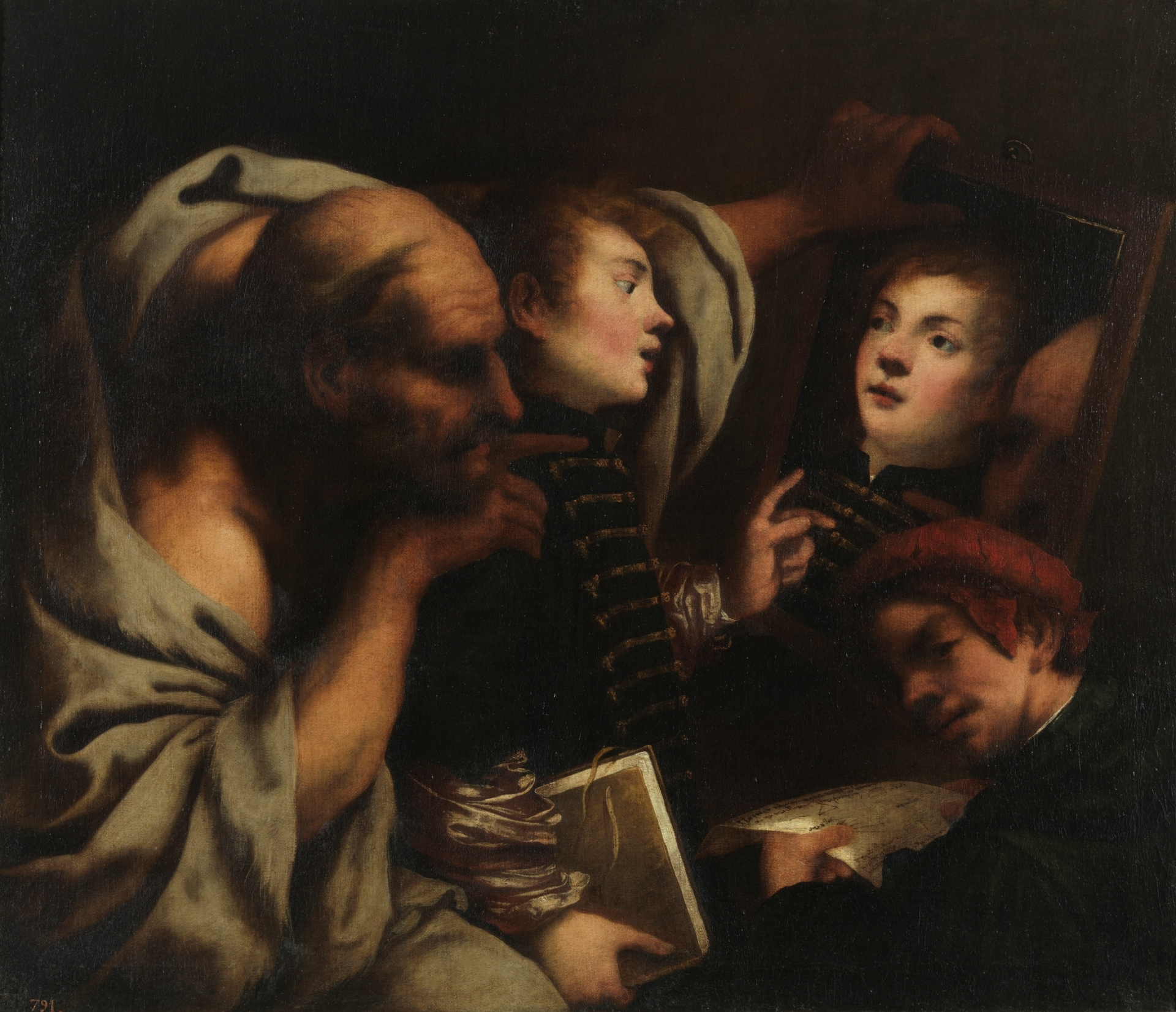
Socrates and two students

Della Vecchia was close to the humanistic and libertine circle around the Accademia degli Incogniti (Academy of the Unknowns), a learned society of freethinking intellectuals, mainly noblemen, that significantly influenced the cultural and political life of mid-17th-century Venice. Many of the subjects of his works were a reflection of the intellectual occupations of this influential Venetian society. For instance the charged eroticism in the Young couple is likely linked to the libertine attitudes of the Accademia.

His son Gasparo Prospero was born on 8 May 1653 and became a minor painter, musician, music theoretician and mathematician. Pietro della Vecchia also had four daughters one of whom died young.

Della Vecchia died on 8 September 1678 in Venice and was buried in the church of S. Canciano.

== Work ==
Della Vecchia was a versatile and prolific painter who worked in many genres and created altarpieces, portraits, genre scenes and grotesques. He relied on the assistance of a large workshop, which explains his large output as well as the fact that many of his works are known in multiple versions. He dated his religious paintings but not his other works, which makes it difficult to understand the evolution of the artist in these other genres.

During his career the artist worked in a variety of artistic styles and absorbed many influences including from contemporary artists as well as artists from the previous century. He combined in his work the monumentality of the 16th century Venetian art of artists such as Titian and Tintoretto with the dramatic effects of the style of the Caravaggisti. In line with the Venetian Baroque his works tend to push the sentiments of the depicted figures to the extreme. This penchant for exaggeration, even the grotesque, was central to della Vecchia's mature style and was influential on other artists. The artist developed a unique style, which was characterised by its pursuit of artistic virtuosity, and often depicted subject matter which was unusual and esoteric. These features explain the high demand for his work by the more discerning Venetian collectors of his time.

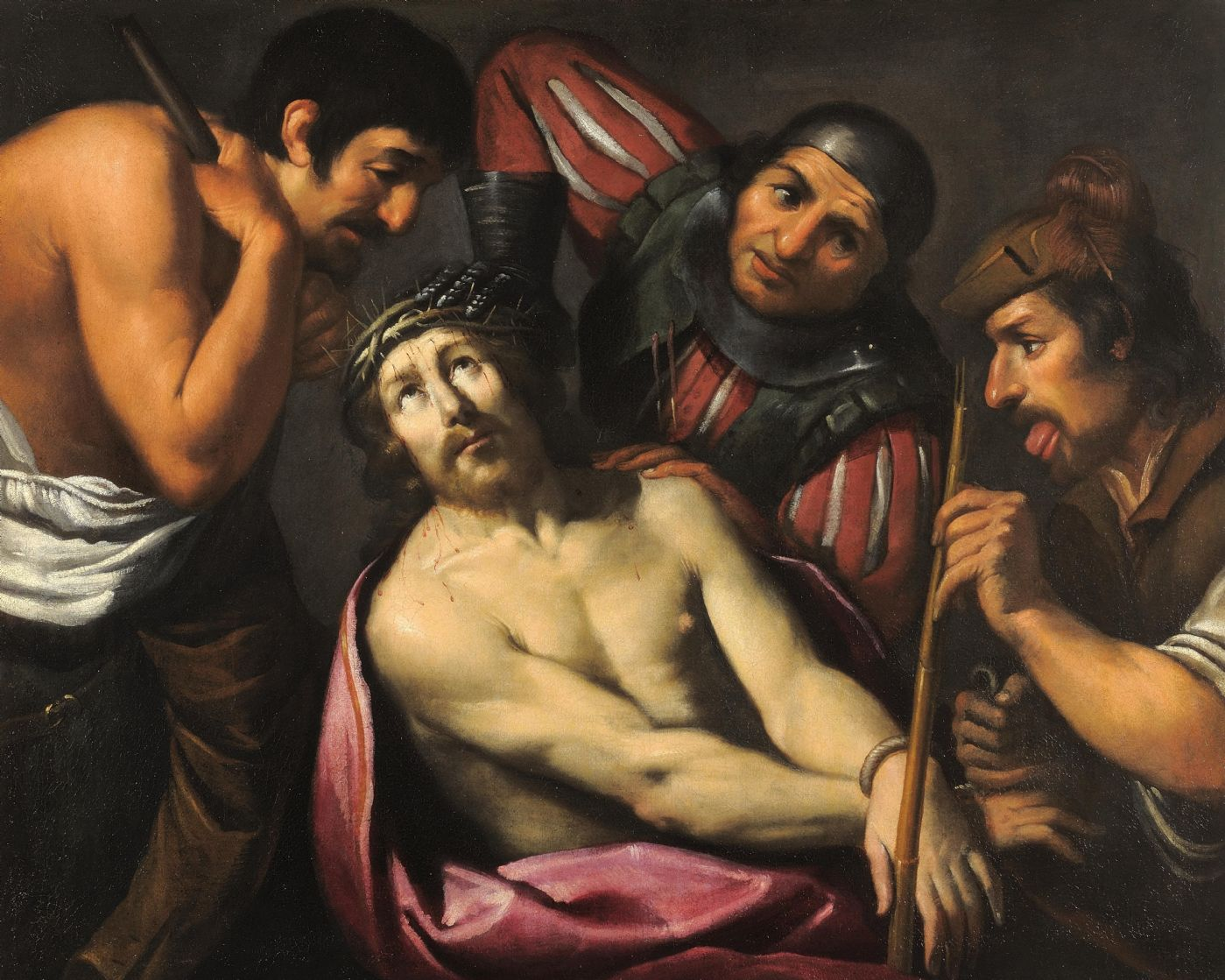
Christ Mocked

His earliest known works include two representations of Saint Francis, which display clear Caravaggesque tendencies. Some paintings of this early period show an affinity with those of an anonymous artist likely of French origin, the so-called Candelight Master, who can perhaps be identified with Trophime Bigot. It is assumed that during his presumed stay in Rome from 1621/2 to 1626 he may have been in contact with French followers of Caravaggio active in Rome such as Trophime Bigot and Claude Vignon. The first dated work by della Vecchia is the Calvary in the church of San Lio in Venice, and is dated 1633: It still shows the influence of Carlo Saraceni and Jean Leclerc, his presumed masters.

The influence of Bernardo Strozzi becomes noticeable in his work after 1630. This is apparent in the Angel Offering a Skull to St Giustina, who stands between St Joseph and St John (1640, Accademia, Venice) painted for the church of San Giustina. From 1640 to 1673 he painted designs for some the mosaic depictions inside the St. Mark's Basilica. A development towards greater drama was visible after 1650. The works of that time draw again on the Caravaggesque models he followed at the start of his career. The apex of this evolution is apparent in the two remaining works of the cycle of seven paintings that the artist executed between 1664 and 1674 for the second cloister of the Jesuit church in Venice. The paintings represent the Conversion of Francis Borgia (Musée des beaux-arts de Brest) and Marco Gussoni in the Ferrara lazaretto (location unknown). The macabre themes, the effects of spectral lights and the suffocating lack of space in the compositions are unique in Venetian painting of the seventeenth century, comparable only with the morbid paintings of the Milanese or Neapolitan schools. After this cycle his later paintings appear without inspiration and derivative from the painter's earlier works. Of greater interest are some historical paintings of this period, which show in the bold brushstrokes and the bright and dazzling palette the influence of the leading 17th-century Venetian painter Francesco Maffei, who died in 1660. Other works of his later period show the influence of Giambattista Langetti and the group of tenebrosi active in Venice around 1660.

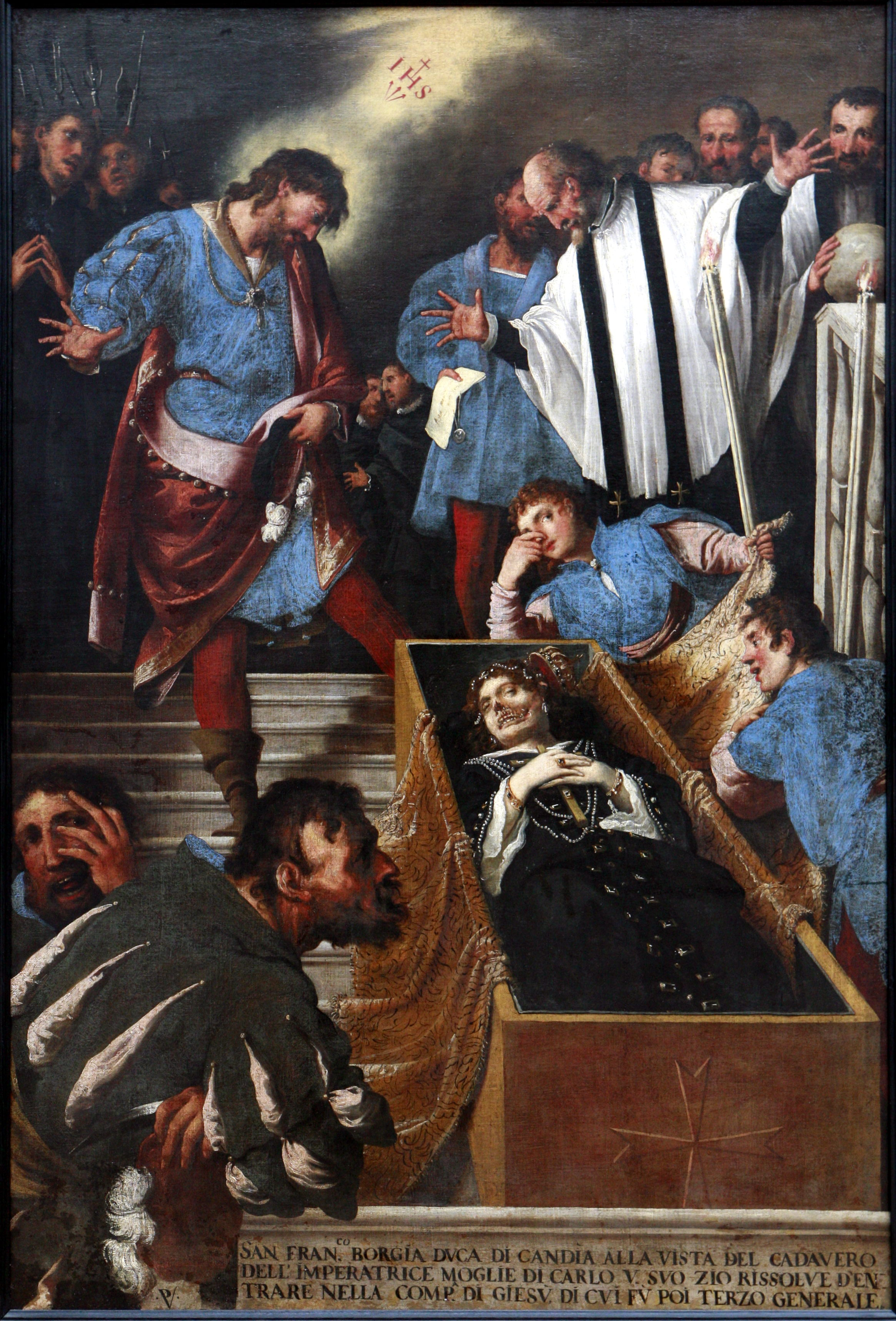
The conversion of Francis Borgia

Della Vecchia had a notable interest in Venetian masters including Titian and Giorgione. This interest was likely nurtured during a stay as an assistant in the workshop of Padovanino. For his skill in imitating the works of Giorgione, his friend Marco Boschini coined for him the nickname 'simia da Zorzon', meaning 'ape of Giorgione'. Giorgione was called Zorzon in the Venetian dialect. According to Boschini, della Vecchia abused of his skill in imitating the older Venetian masters. Boschini recounts that when the art dealer Francesca Fontana was assembling a collection for Cardinal Leopoldo de' Medici he was given a 'Giorgione self-portrait'. This portrait was actually an imitation by della Vecchia painted from his own features. When the deceit was discovered, della Vecchia claimed he was solely trying to emulate Giorgione and that he had produced the work 30 years earlier for his father-in-law Nicolas Régnier. Nicolas Régnier, who was not only a painter but also an art dealer, had sold the painting. Thirty years later, it was believed that the work was in fact a genuine Giorgione. It appears therefore that della Vecchia's imitations could very well be regarded in certain cases as attempts to pass off the imitations as originals. His friend Boschini regarded these imitations, often executed in a remarkably ingenious manner, as displays of virtuosity. Other artists whose works della Vecchia and his workshop regularly imitated included Titian, Romanino, Palma Vecchio, Paris Bordone and Jacopo Bassano. His imitations of Giorgione offer an important insight into the manner in which that artist's work was perceived in the 17th century. It is believed that none of della Vecchia's works in the style of Giorgione were based on now lost compositions of Giorgione but were 'original' creations in the style of Giorgione.

Della Vecchia was known for his paintings of soldiers (referred to as 'bravi') with broad feathered hats of which he made many versions and variations. Some of these paintings depict individual soldiers while others show soldiers in genre scenes such as fortune telling, playing dice etc. The innumerable repetitions of these works depicting warriors and other popular figures created by his workshop had a negative impact on his posthumous reputation. Della Vecchia painted not only imaginary portraits of bravos, but also of philosophers, pages and courtesans. These portraits are an expression of the Venetian Baroque's taste for eccentric subject matter. They also represent the artist's reaction to the expressive head portraits (tronies) by Caravaggio and Rembrandt.

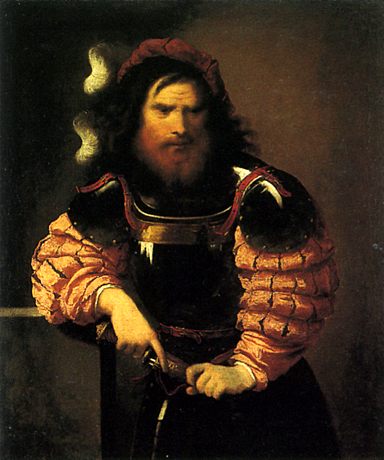
The red warrior

There are about eight pictures by della Vecchia in which the landscape is the primary subject. These include four idyllic landscapes that presage the Rococo style (now in the Pinacoteca Querini-Stampalia) and the Rocky Landscape with Warriors in the Hermitage. Two further landscapes were auctioned at Dorotheum on 20 October 2015 as lot 279. These latter works are executed in a painterly technique, reminiscent of the 'picturesque' style of late 16th-century artists Titian and Jacopo Bassano. The two compositions likely do not depict a particular story, but are rather an evocation of a romanticised wild countryside, frequented by intrepid warriors wearing fantastic costumes.

Della Vecchia maintained close links with the members of the Accademia degli Incogniti. Their philosophical occupations were reflected in the iconography of some of his paintings of the 1650s and 1660s. In some works he treated the mathematical, philosophical and cabalistic ideas in a serious manner and in others he ridiculed them through salacious images. For example in the Allegory of architecture (1654, Accademia Carrara di Belle Arti di Bergamo), which depicts a half-naked woman crouched over a book on a ledge with an old man and another half-naked woman seeming to beseech her, he gives expression to some of those ideas.
