= Matteo Ingoli =

Italian painter (1587–1631)

Matteo Ingoli (1587–1631) was an Italian painter of the early-Baroque period.

== Biography ==
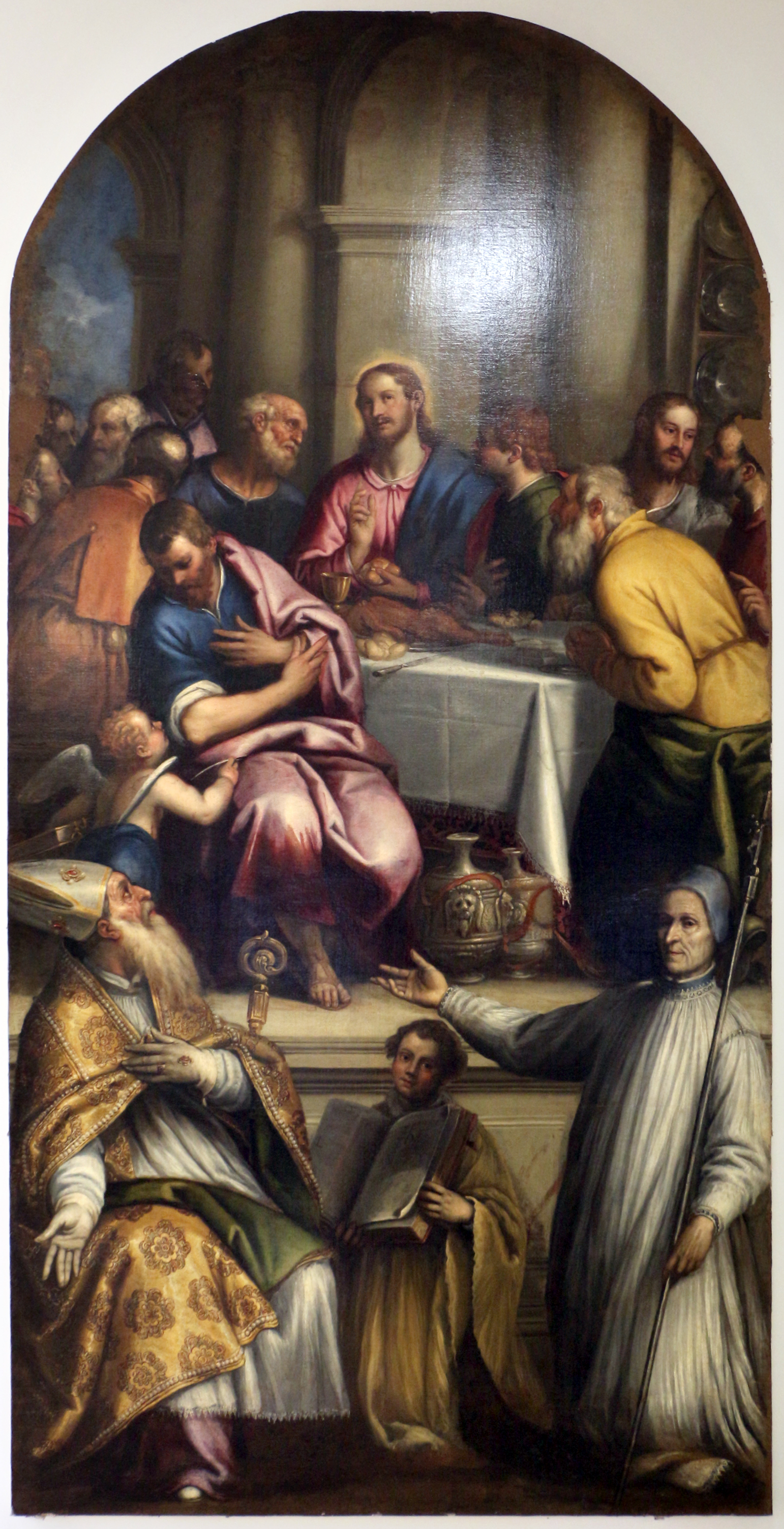
Last Supper with Saint Apollinate and San Lorenzo Giustiniani, Pinacoteca di Ravenna

He was born in Ravenna. He was a pupil of Alvise del Friso and a follower of Paolo Veronese and Palma Giovane, and painted much in Venice. He painted two canvases, the Baptism and Presentation of Mary to temple, for the church of San Lorenzo in Castelli Calepio.
