= Udine Cathedral =

Catholic cathedral in Italy

Coordinates: 46°03′44″N 13°14′13″E

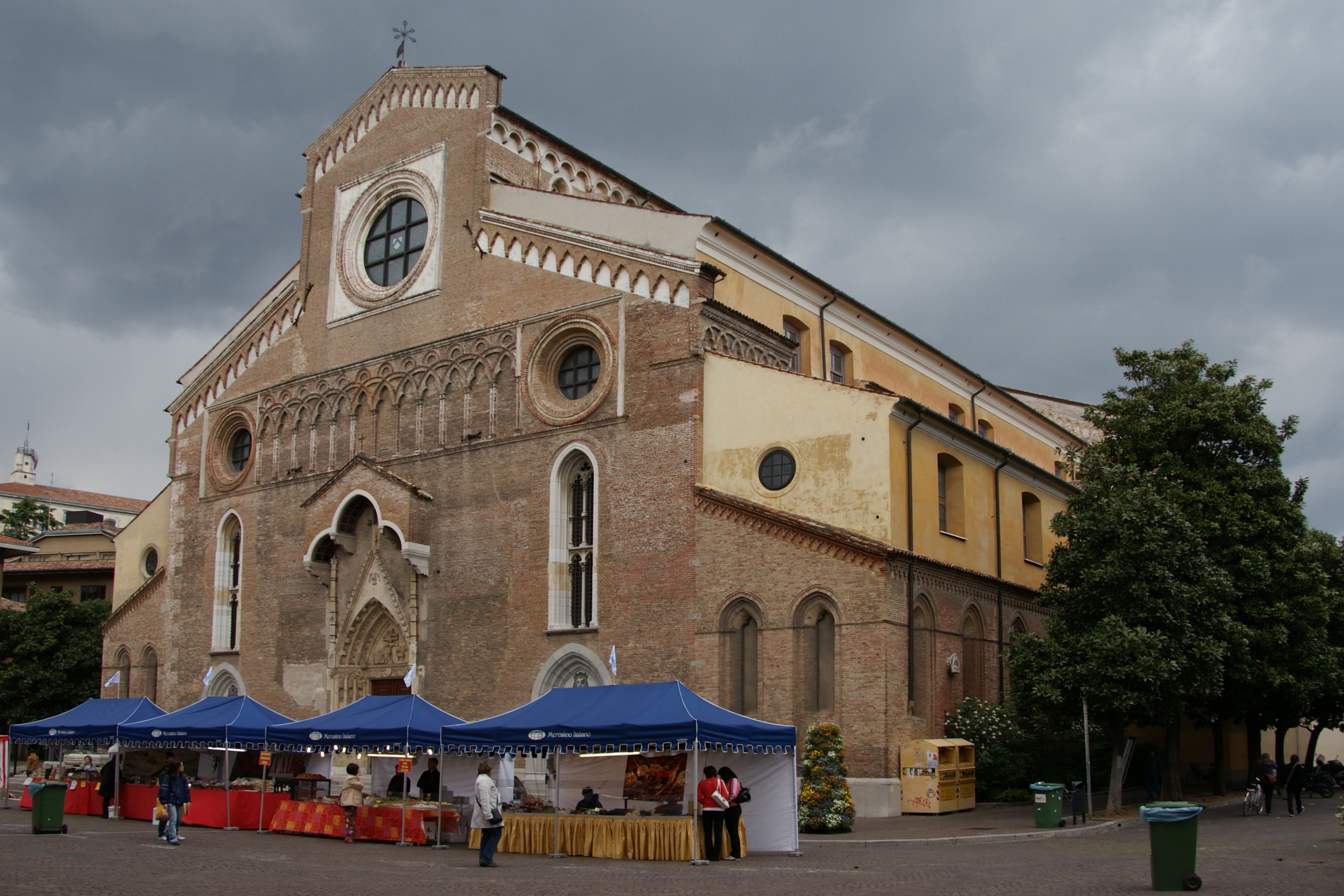
Udine Cathedral.

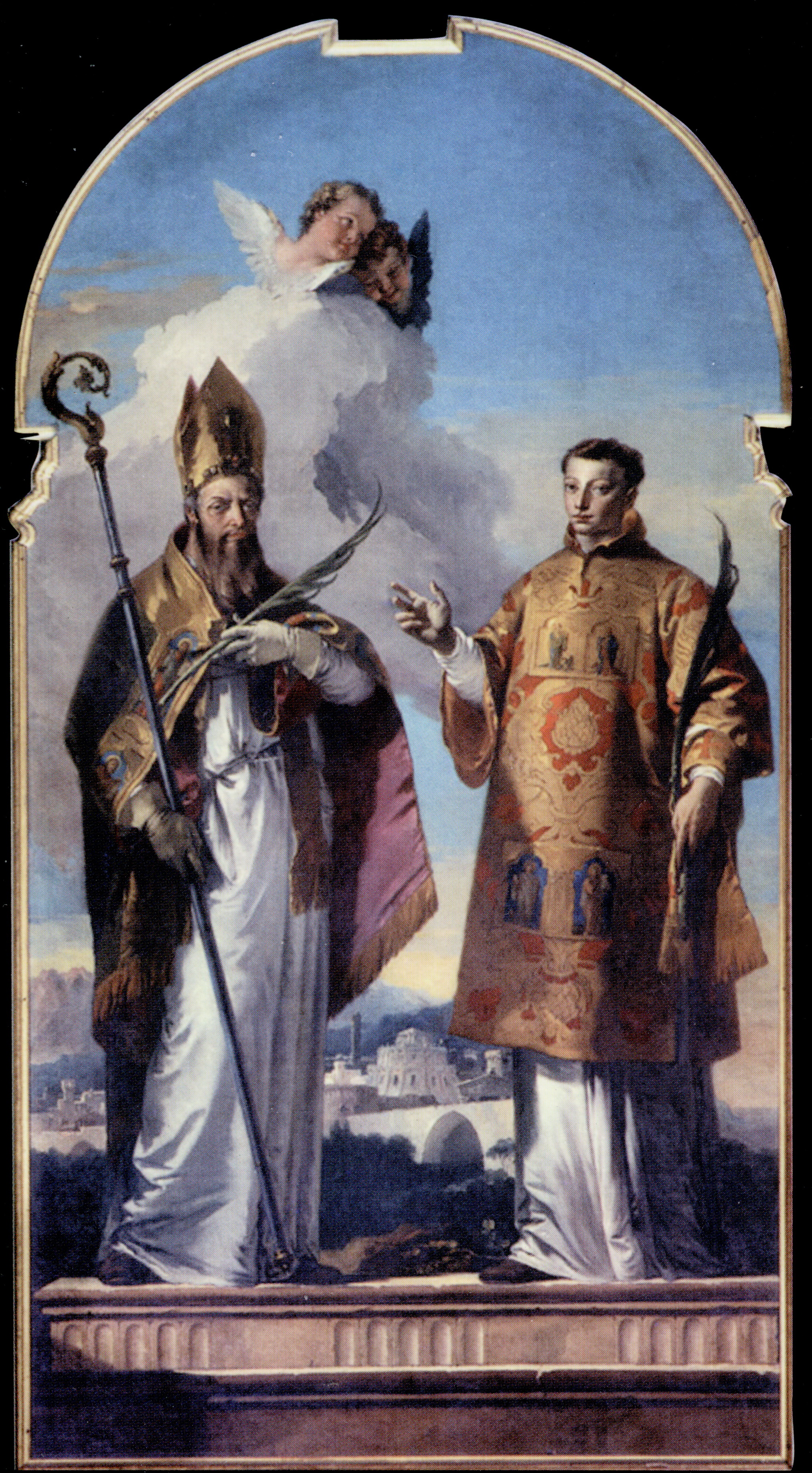
Sts. Hermagoras and Fortunatus by Giovanni Battista Tiepolo (1736).

Udine Cathedral (Italian: Duomo di Udine, Cattedrale di Santa Maria Annunziata) is a Catholic cathedral located in Udine, north-eastern Italy. It is the seat of the Archbishop of Udine.

== History ==
The cathedral's construction began in 1236 by will of Berthold, patriarch of Aquileia, on a Latin cross-shaped plan with three aisles and side-chapels. The style should follow that of the contemporary Franciscan churches. The church was consecrated in 1335 as Santa Maria Maggiore.

In 1348 an earthquake damaged the building, which was restored starting from 1368. In this occasion, the larger previous rose window of the façade was replaced by the smaller current one.

At the beginning of the 18th century, a radical transformation project involving both the exterior and the interior was undertaken at the request and expense of the Manin family. The designer was architect Domenico Rossi, the work being finished in 1735.

== Description ==
The church has two main portals, one of which, called Portale della Redenzione, executed by an unknown German master in the 14th century. It has reliefs portraying the Redemption and pointed internal arches. The other one is known as Portale dell'Incoronazion, and was also executed by a German sculptor in 1395–1396. It has figures of saints and, one the upper tympanum, scenes of the Life of Jesus.

The interior has a nave and two aisles separated by pillars. At the sides are four chapels communicating with each other.

In contrast with the Romanesque-Gothic exterior, the Baroque interior has monumental dimensions and contains many works of art by Maffeo Verona, Giovanni Battista Tiepolo, Pomponio Amalteo, and Ludovico Dorigny. The painter Pellegrino da San Daniele contributed to the altarpiece of Saint Joseph and the organ doors. On the ground floor of the bell tower (built from 1441 over the ancient baptistry) is a chapel which is completely adorned with frescoes by Vitale da Bologna (1349).

The cathedral also houses an important museum of religious decorative arts, the Museo del Duomo di Udine.

== Burials ==
- John Sobieslaw of Moravia

== Sources ==
- Official website (in Italian)
- Museo del Duomo di Udine (in Italian)
