= Carlo Caliari =

Italian artist (1570–1596)

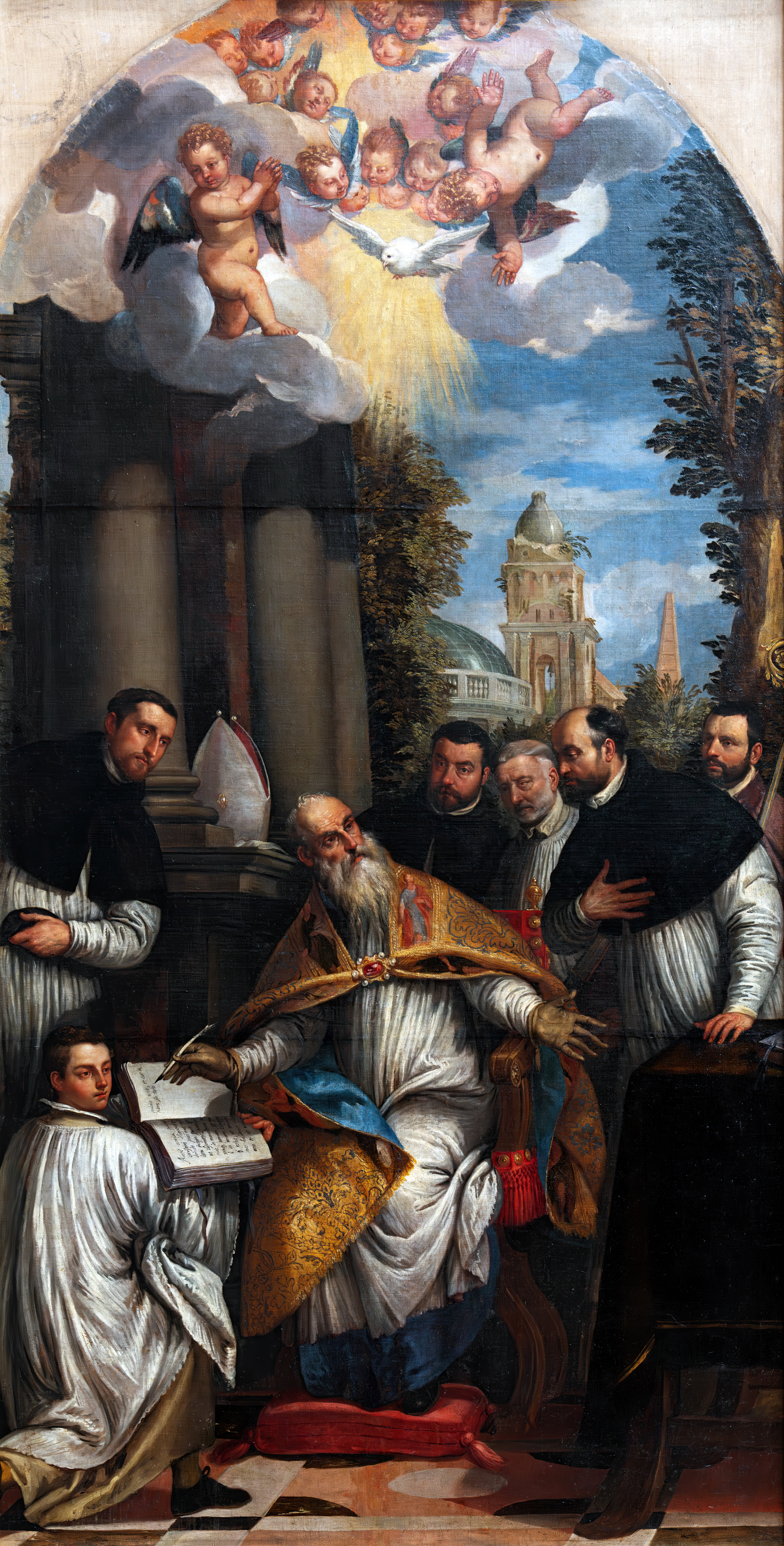
St. Augustine dictates his "Rules" to the Lateran canons - Gallerie dell'Accademia

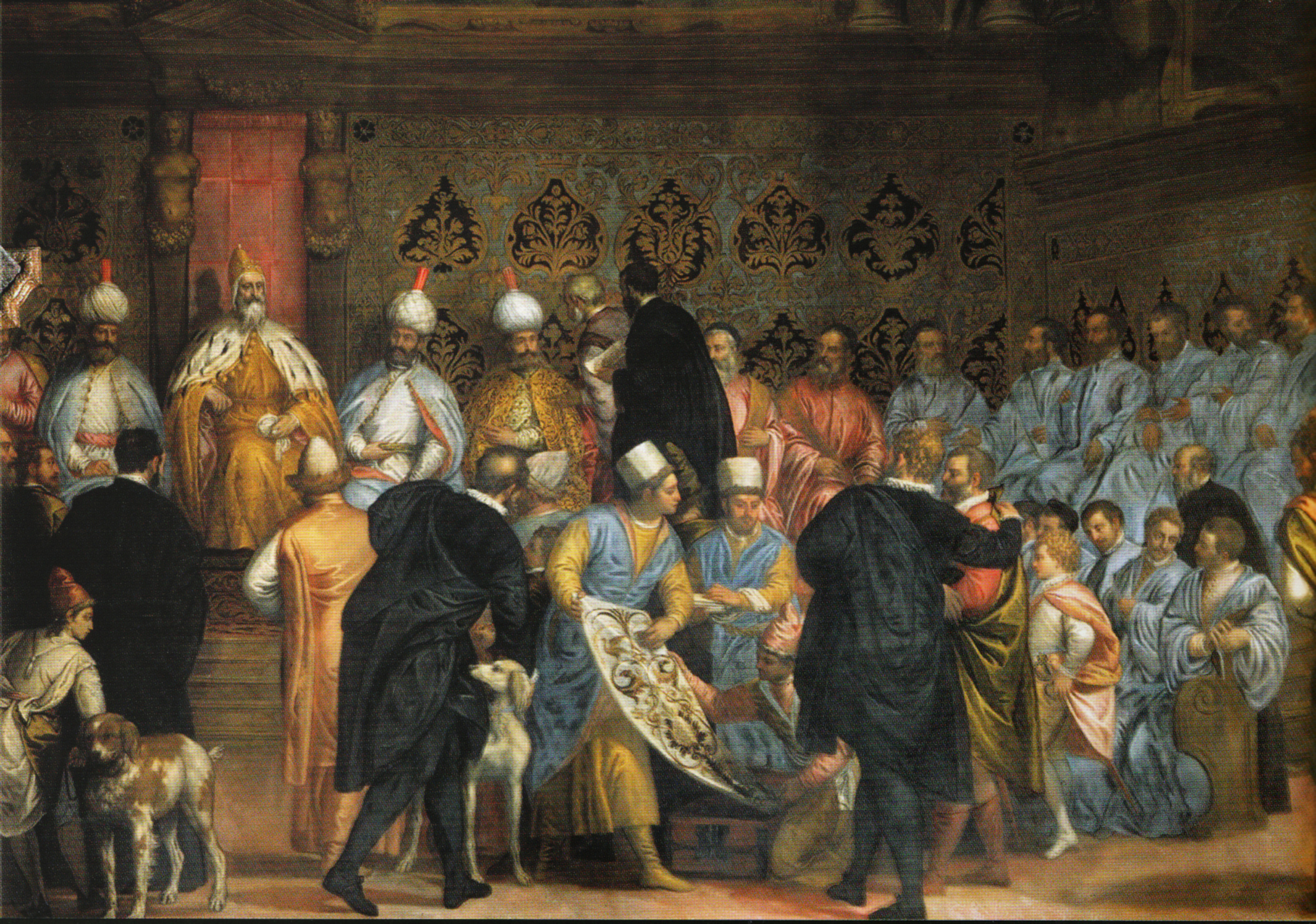
Carletto and Gabriele Caliari, Doge Marino Grimani receiving the Persian ambassadors 1603. Venice, in the Doge's Palace

Carlo Cannovaro Caliari (1570–1596) was an Italian artist of the Renaissance period. He is also known as Carletto. The youngest son of Paolo Veronese, Caliari was active mainly in Venice, where he worked and inherited the studio of his far more famous father, and later worked along with his brother Gabriele and his uncle, Benedetto. His name is attached to several large pictures of banquets in Veronese's style. Alessandro Turchi worked briefly under him.

== Life ==
As the most talented member of his father's workshop, he undoubtedly executed many works that are attributed to his father. Works that have been clearly isolated as Carlo's own are more precise and delicate, both technically and in the physical types; they lack Veronese's bravura, whether in the line and wash of a chiaroscuro drawing or in the richly layered pigments that make an embroidered drape. His early signed works show the influence of both his father and the Bassano family by whom he was trained.

They include Angelica and Medoro (c. 1584; Padua, Barbieri priv. col.), which has a preciousness in the landscape and in details of foliage and coiffures that sets it apart from Veronese's work. The signed Nativity (c. 1588; Brescia, S Afra) combines narrative detail typical of the Bassano with morphological similarities to Veronese. There are similar characteristics in frescoes at the Villa Loredan, Sant'Urbano, Padua, that are assigned to Carlo by Crosato.

== Selected works ==
- "Bearded Man Wearing a Ruff c. 1590". FAMSF in San Francisco.
- "Saint Mathieu et l'Ange, drawing, sold at Christie's in Paris, auction March 17, 2005". christies.com.

== Sources ==
- Bryan, Michael (1886). Robert Edmund Graves (ed.). Dictionary of Painters and Engravers, Biographical and Critical. Vol. I: A-K. London: George Bell and Sons. p. 211.
