= M. Laura Feltri =

Italian neuroscientist

M. Laura Feltri MD
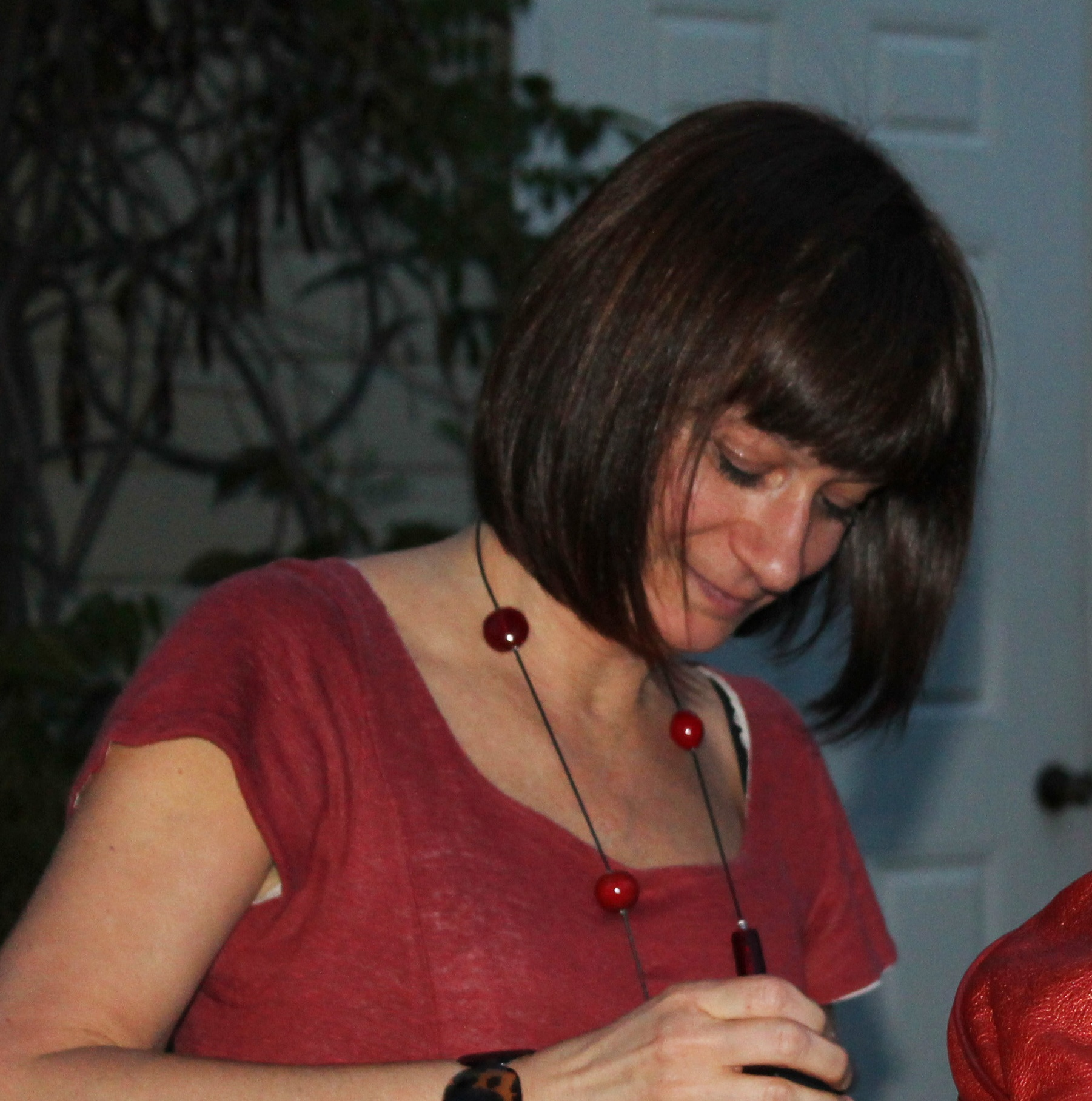
- Laura Feltri in 2013
- Education: University of Milan (M.D., residency); University of Pennsylvania (fellowship)
- Occupations: Professor of Biochemistry and Neurology
- Medical career
- Profession: Professor
- Field: Biochemistry and Neurology
- Institutions: Vita-Salute San Raffaele University; Institute for Myelin and Glia Exploration, Jacobs School of Medicine and Biomedical Sciences, University at Buffalo
- Research: Peripheral Nervous System

M. Laura Feltri (1963 – December 25, 2023) was a professor of biochemistry and neurology at University at Buffalo’s Jacobs School of Medicine and Biomedical Sciences. Feltri authored over 150 articles during her career, with a particular focus on Schwann cells and the peripheral nervous system.

== Education ==
Feltri earned her medical degree at University of Milan, where she performed a residency in neurology. She later acted as a research fellow at the University of Pennsylvania.

== Career ==
Feltri began a lab with her husband Larry Wrabetz at Vita-Salute San Raffaele University in Milan, Italy in 1995. In 2011, the couple would establish the Hunter James Kelly Research Institute, now known as the Institute for Myelin and Glia Exploration, in Buffalo, New York, as part of the Jacobs School of Medicine and Biomedical Sciences at University at Buffalo. She participated in the administration of the Peripheral Nerve Society throughout her career, serving as a board member from 2009 to 2013, and then the president-elect and president from 2021 to 2023. Additionally, she served as a chair of the Cellular & Molecular Biology of Glia Study section of the National Institute of Neurological Disorders and Stroke.

== Research ==
Feltri’s research focused on the cellular and molecular biology of Schwann cells, the glial cells that form myelin in the peripheral nervous system (PNS). Her work defined how Schwann cells establish, maintain, and repair myelin, and how their interactions with axons and the extracellular matrix govern peripheral nerve development and regeneration. Early in her career, Feltri developed one of the first mutagenesis-based tools to dissect Schwann cell biology. Using the Cre–loxP recombination system, she and colleagues generated transgenic mice expressing Cre recombinase under the control of the myelin protein zero (P0) promoter, enabling Schwann cell–specific gene targeting. This genetic tool became a cornerstone for the study of glial cell development and myelin disorders.

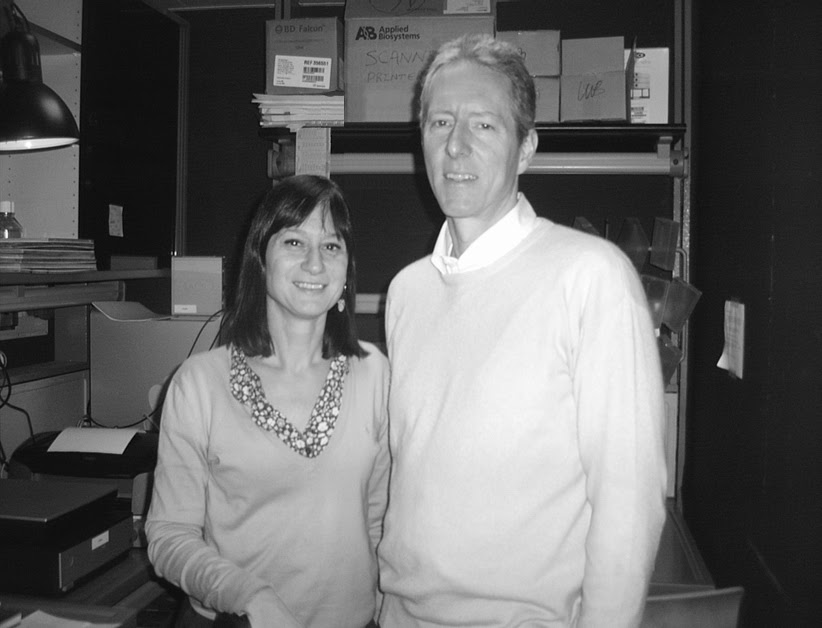
Laura Feltri and Lawrence Wrabetz in their lab in Milan

Working closely with her long-term collaborator and spouse, Lawrence Wrabetz, Feltri pioneered the use of transgenic and conditional knockout mouse models to study inherited demyelinating neuropathies, including Charcot–Marie–Tooth disease and Krabbe leukodystrophy. These models allowed her team to uncover how disruptions in Schwann cell–axon communication or myelin protein synthesis contribute to neuropathy, and to test potential therapeutic strategies in vivo.

Feltri’s laboratory made seminal contributions to understanding how extracellular matrix (ECM) components, such as laminins and integrins, orchestrate the morphological differentiation of Schwann cells. Her studies demonstrated that ECM–integrin signaling is essential for radial sorting of axons, a critical step in nerve development that enables myelination of large-diameter fibers. Disruption of these adhesive interactions led to hypomyelination and structural disorganization, establishing a molecular framework for how Schwann cells sense and shape their environment.

== Legacy ==
Feltri was widely recognized for her mentorship and dedication to training young scientists in glial and peripheral nerve biology. Many of her former trainees went on to establish independent research programs in Schwann cell and myelin biology.

She was an active member and past president of the Peripheral Nerve Society (PNS), where she championed the support of junior investigators. The PNS later established a training grant program to foster early-career research in peripheral nerve, continuing the mentoring legacy Feltri helped build.
