= Nicolas Régnier =

Flemish-Italian painter (1591–1667)

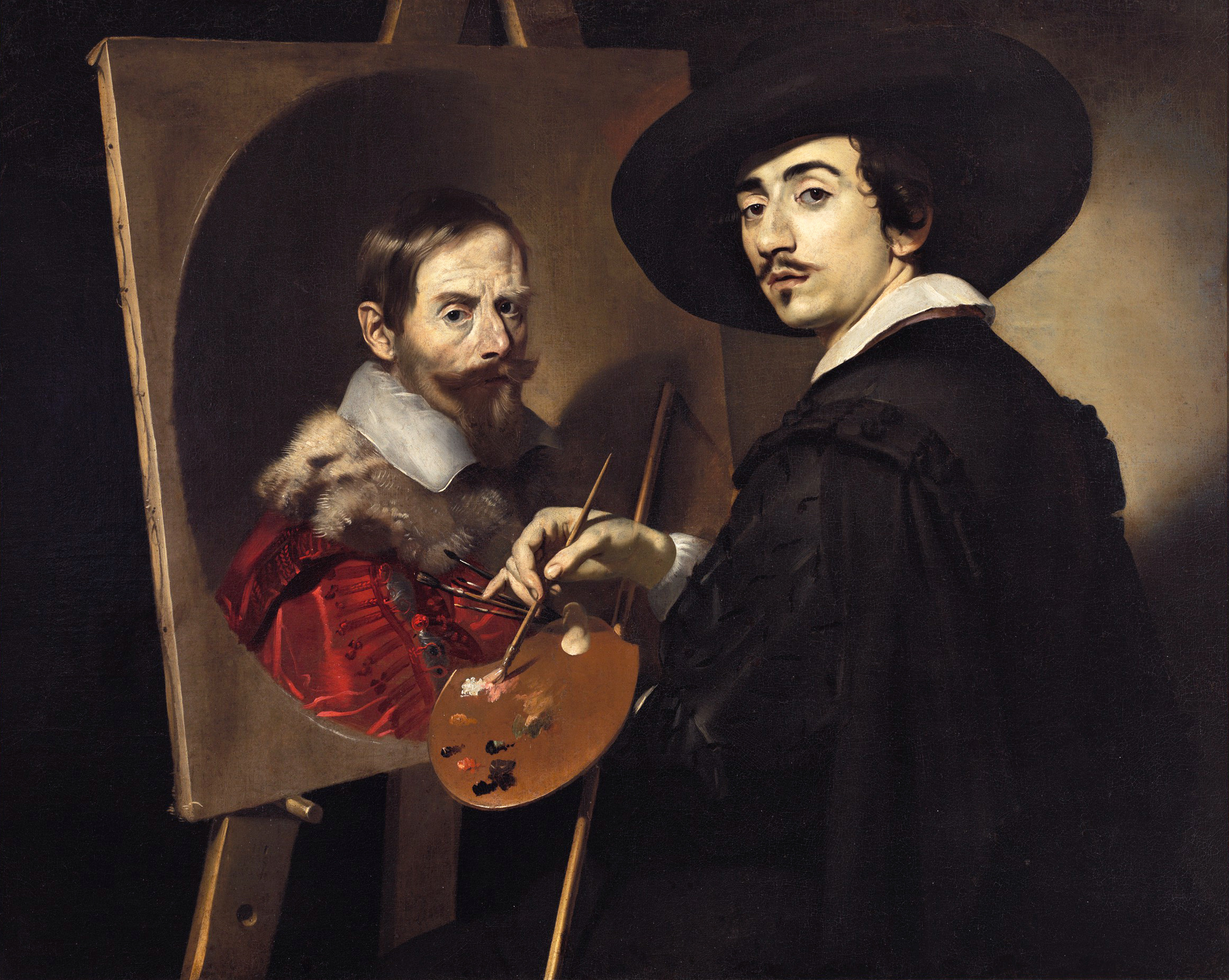
Self-portrait with an easel, 1623-24

Nicolas Régnier (1591–1667), known in Italy as Niccolò Renieri, was a painter, art dealer and art collector from the County of Hainaut, a French-speaking part of the Spanish Netherlands. He is often referred to as a Flemish artist because this term was often used to designate people from the Spanish Netherlands. After training in Antwerp, he was active in Italy where he was part of the international Caravaggesque movement. His subjects include genre scenes with card players, fortune tellers, soldiers and concerts, religious scenes, saints, mythological and allegorical scenes, and portraits. He also painted a few scenes with carnivals.

== Life ==
Régnier was born in Maubeuge. It was previously believed that his birth date was 6 December 1591. A review of his baptismal records has led to the conclusion that he may have been born at least a year earlier. He apprenticed in Antwerp with Abraham Janssens, a Flemish painter who had studied in Rome at the time of Caravaggio and was one of the first Flemish followers of Caravaggio.

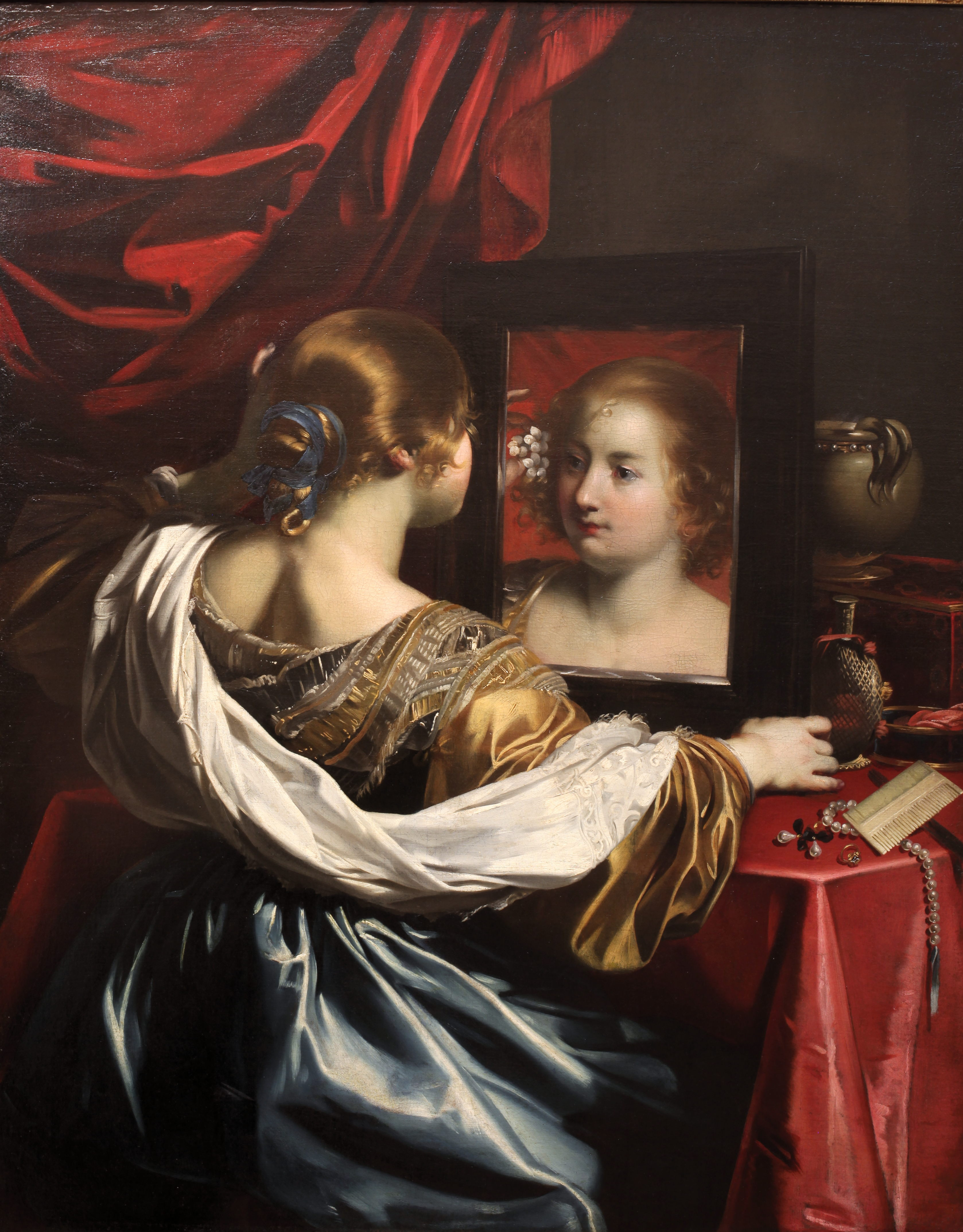
Woman before a mirror or Vanity

It is unclear when Régnier reached Rome. He travelled to Rome via Parma where he was present in 1616–1617. He is definitely in Rome by 1620 when he is registered sharing lodgings with the Dutch painters David de Haen and Dirk van Baburen, both part of the Northern Caravaggesque movement. He became acquainted in Rome with the work of Bartolomeo Manfredi, an important Italian interpreter of Caravaggio. The German painter and biographer Joachim von Sandrart called Régnier a follower of Manfredi. Régnier became a member of the household of Marchese Vincenzo Giustiniani, a rich banker and prominent patron of Caravaggio. He was Giustiniani's official painter and resided during the period 1622–1623 at Giustiniani's palace on the Piazza San Luigi dei Francesi. His duties included the painting of religious and profane subjects. After marrying Cecilia Bezzi in 1623 he left Giustiniani's household. In Rome Régnier was also in close contact with Simon Vouet, whose interpretation of Caravaggio with its clear light and classical structure would influence him.

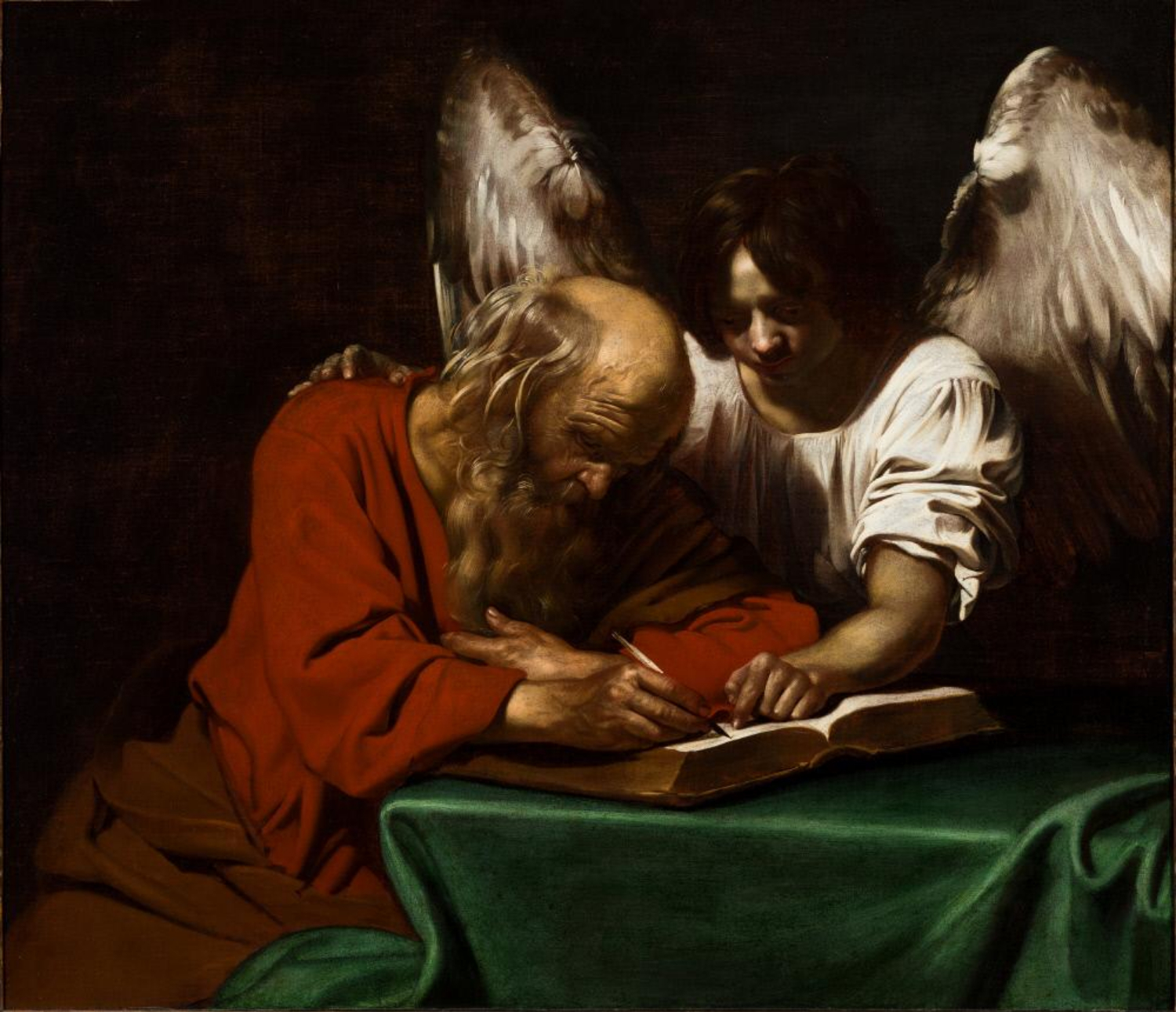
Saint Matthew and the Angel

By 1626, Régnier had moved to Venice, maybe after first stopping over in Bologna. He was enrolled in the Venetian Guild in 1626. In Venice, he expanded his activities to dealing in antiquities and paintings. In 1634 he was recorded trying to sell paintings to the Duke of Hamilton through an English agent. It is not clear whether as an art dealer he was also selling any of the forgeries, which his son-in-law Pietro della Vecchia is known to have created. He was a painter to the king of France, as a supplier of paintings purchased by Mazarin. He was often consulted in the period 1661-1667 as an expert to decide on whether artworks were forgeries, especially with respect to drawings. He also befriended the Italian painter Guido Cagnacci.

Of his four daughters, Lucretia married the Flemish painter Daniel van den Dyck while Clorinda married the prominent Italian painter Pietro della Vecchia (1605-1678). His daughters were also painters in their own right and worked with their husbands on commissions. Regnier's only son, Giovanni Paolo, was baptised on 27 October 1639. Régnier's half-brother was Michele Desubleo, an artist working in a very similar style and whose work is often wrongly attributed to Régnier and vice versa.

He died in Venice.

== Work ==
His subjects include genre scenes with card players, fortune tellers, concerts, soldiers and carnival scenes, portraits, religious scenes, saints and mythological and allegorical subjects. Together with the French painter Valentin de Boulogne, Régnier is regarded as a follower of the Manfrediana Methodus, which refers to those artists who interpreted Caravaggio through the prism of Bartolomeo Manfredi's processing of the lessons of Caravaggio. Some of his works are so close to those of Manfredi that they have been wrongly attributed to Manfredi.

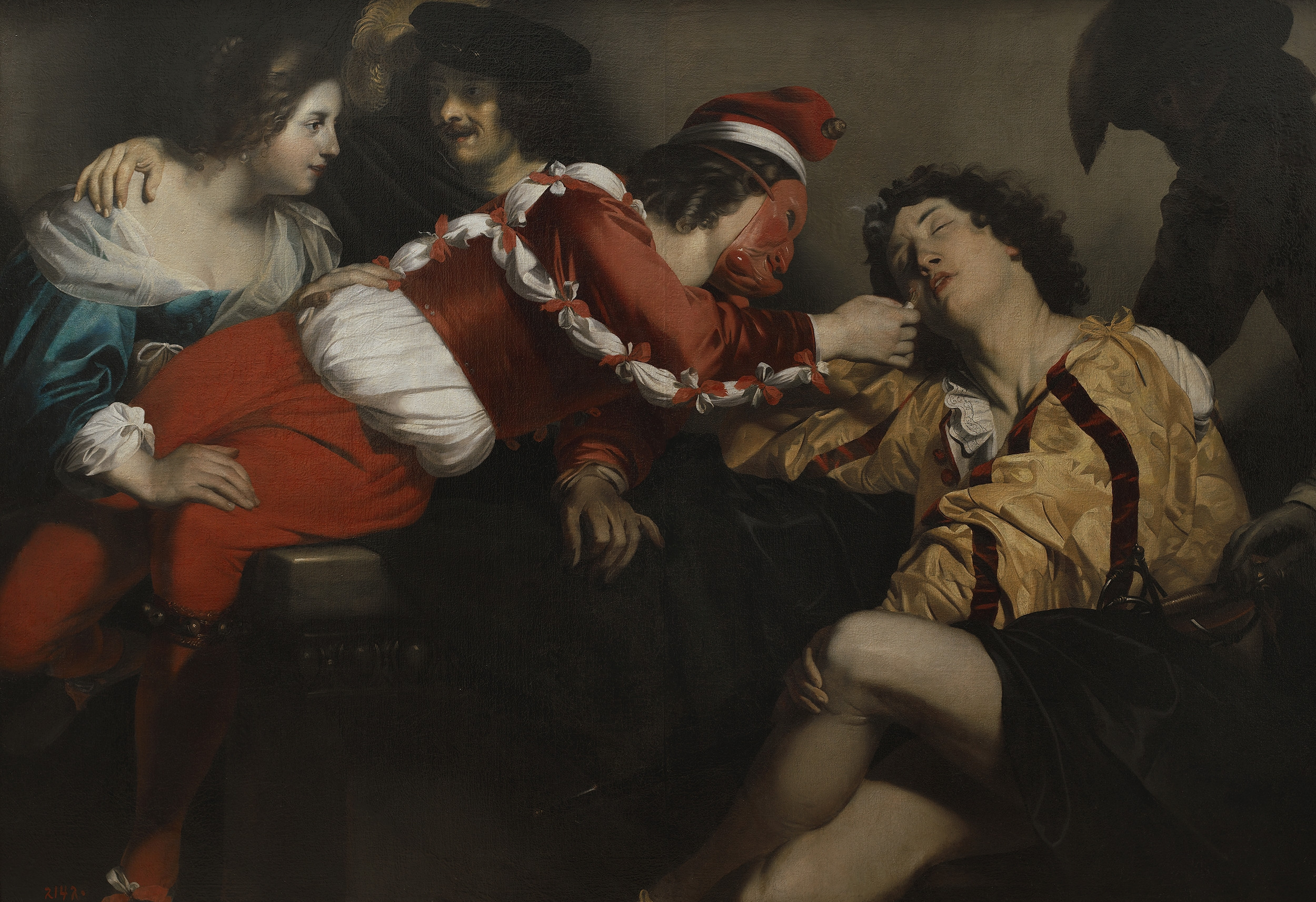
Carnival Scene

Régnier's style is characterised by its pursuit of refinement and elegance, in contrast with the Northern Caravaggisti such as Gerard van Honthorst and Dirck van Baburen, whose art dwells on the more earthy aspects of genre scenes. After his move to Venice, his style became even more smooth under the influence of the Bolognese painters, such as Guido Reni.

He painted Saint Sebastian Tended by Saint Irene three times, as well as a number of nearly-nude single figures of Saint Sebastian and John the Baptist. He painted Mary Magdalene numerous times.

== Selected works ==
- Allegory of Vanity - Pandora (1626), private collection
- Cardsharps and Fortune Teller (1620-1622), Museum of Fine Arts - Budapest
- Carnival scene (1630), National Museum, Warsaw
- The Death of Sophonisba (1665-1667), Leicester Museum & Art Gallery
- Guessing Game (1620-1625), Galleria Uffizi - Florence
- The Fortune Teller, Nicolas Régnier (1625-1626), Musée du Louvre
- Marquis Vincenzo Giustiniani (1630)

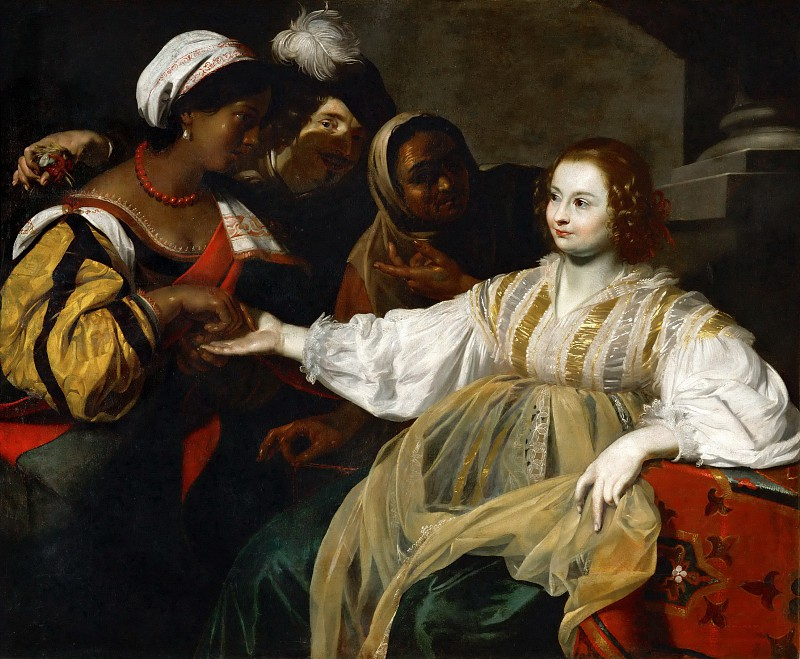
Fortune teller

- A Musician Playing a Lute to a Singing Girl (1621-1622), private collection
- The Penitent Magdalen (1650-1660), Birmingham Museum and Art Gallery
- Penitent Mary Magdalene, private collection
- Portrait of Maria Farnese (1638)
- Saint John the Baptist (1615-1620), Hermitage Museum - St. Petersburg
- Saint Sebastian (1620), Hermitage Museum - St. Petersburg
- Saint Sebastian (1622-1625), Gemaldegalerie Alte Meister - Dresden
- Saint Sebastian Tended by Saint Irene, Ferens Art Gallery - Hull
- Self-Portrait with a Portrait on an Easel (1623-1624), Fogg Museum of Art - University of Harvard
- Sleeper Awakened by a Young Woman with Fire, National Museum of Fine Arts - Stockholm
- Vanity (1626), Musée des Beaux-Arts de Lyon
- Allegory of Vanity-Pandora, Staatsgalerie Stuttgart.
- Baptism of Christ, 1627, Church of San Giovanni Battista dei Genovesi, Rome
- David with the head of Goliath, 1616, Palazzo Spada, Galleria Spada, Sala IV, Inventory n° 176, Roma (Attribution has been discussed, some critics considering it may be a Bartolomeo Manfredi work)

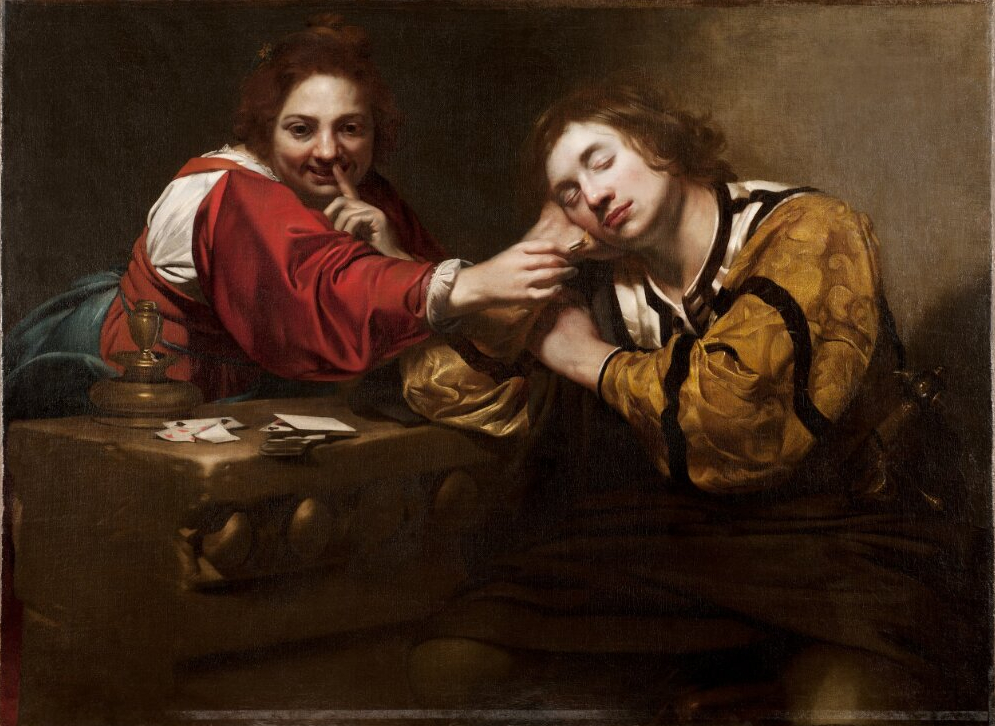
Sleeping man awakened by a young woman with fire

- Judith holding the head of Holofernes, Prado Museum, Madrid.
