= Michele Desubleo =

Italian painter

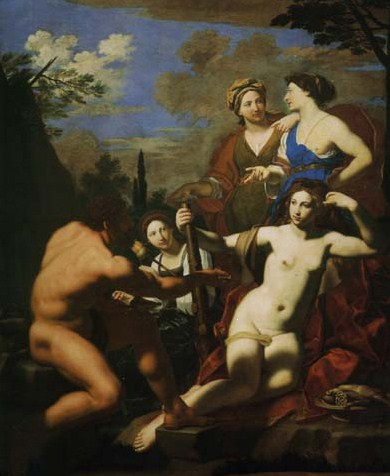
Hercules and Omphale

Michele Desubleo (1601–1676), also called Michele Fiammingo (Flemish) or Michele di Giovanni de Sobleau, was a Flemish painter active in Central and North Italy during the Baroque era.

== Biography ==
Born in Maubeuge in 1601, Desubleo probably learned his trade in Flanders, although there is no proof he was trained in the workshop of Abraham Janssens together with his stepbrother Nicolas Régnier. With the latter he moved to Rome, where he is recorded in 1624 and 1625. By the beginning of the 1630s, he was working in Bologna, in the busy workshop of Guido Reni, who was a crucial influence on him and on other artists of his age or slightly younger, including Simone Cantarini and Jean Boulanger. Starting 1654, he worked for a decade in the Veneto region. After 1665, there is evidence of his presence in Parma, where the significant paintings he left include a large altarpiece with the Madonna and Saints for the cathedral and a canvas on the secular subject of Sacred Love Triumphing over Profane Love. It was in Parma that he died in 1676.

== Other projects ==
Media related to Michele Desubleo at Wikimedia Commons
