= Gabriele Caliari =

Italian trader and painter (1568-1631)

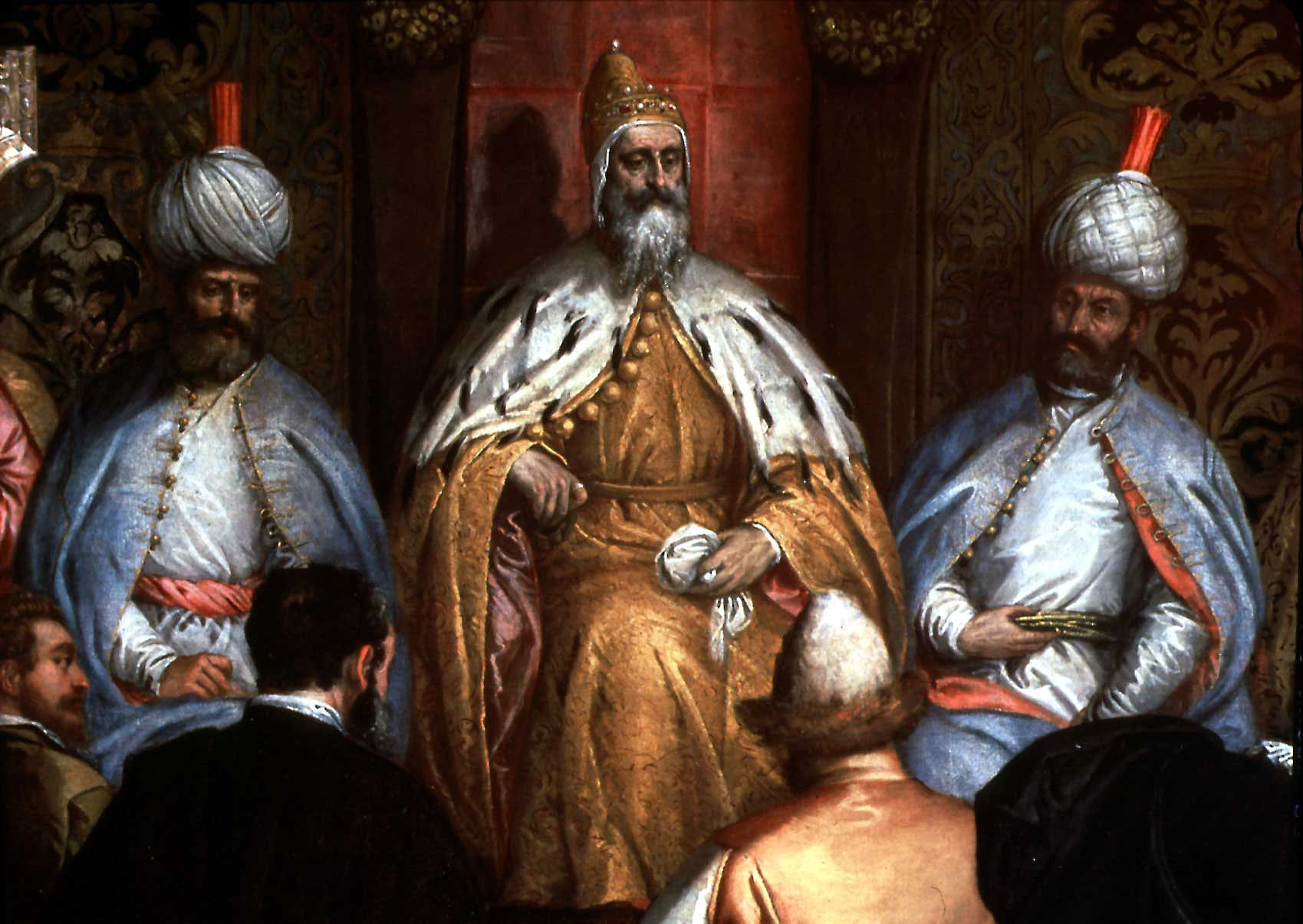
Marino Grimani receiving the Persian ambassador (c. 1600), Doge's Palace, Venice

Gabriele Caliari (1568–1631) was an Italian of the late-Renaissance period. He was the eldest son of Paolo Veronese, born in 1568, and died of the plague. After training in the workshop of his father, he seems to have painted few pictures of his own, and devoted himself chiefly to commerce, going on painting just for pleasure.

His work is included in the collection of the Art Institute of Chicago, the Rijksmuseum, Palazzo Ducale and the National Gallery of Art.

== Sources ==
- Bryan, Michael (1886). Robert Edmund Graves (ed.). Dictionary of Painters and Engravers, Biographical and Critical. Vol. I: A-K. London: George Bell and Sons. p. 211.
- Penny, Nicholas, National Gallery Catalogues (new series): The Sixteenth Century Italian Paintings, Volume II, Venice 1540-1600, 2008, National Gallery Publications Ltd, ISBN 1857099133
