= Maffeo Verona =

Italian painter (1576–1618)

Maffeo Verona (1576–1618) was an Italian painter of the late Renaissance period.

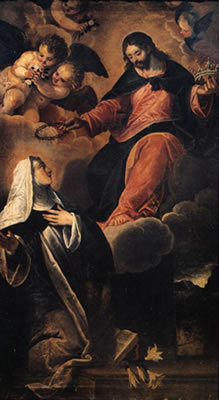
Christ gives the crown to saint Catherine, Udine.

He was born at Verona in 1576, and was a pupil of Luigi Benfatto, but derived more advantage from the works of his kinsman, Paolo Veronese, than from his master. He is said to have painted with uncommon celerity. Many of his works exist in the public buildings of Venice, among them a Christ bearing His Cross and a Crucifixion in the chapel dedicated to St. Isidoro in the St. Mark's Basilica. The same church has two altar-pieces, a Deposition from the Cross and a Resurrection. He also painted several pictures for the Udine Cathedral, and for churches in his native city.
