= Luigi Benfatto =

Italian painter (1551–1611)

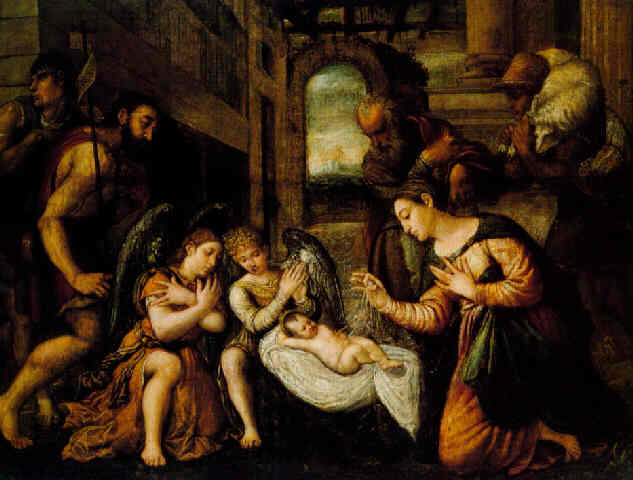
Nativity.

Luigi Benfatto known as Alvise dal Friso (1551–1611) was an Italian painter of the late-Renaissance period. He was born at Verona, was the nephew and pupil of Paolo Veronese. He painted Glory of the saint for the church of St. Nicholas and pictures of St. Marta for the Church of Santa Marta al Collegio Romano. He is also called Luigi dal Friso and Alvise dal Friso (Alvise is the Venetian form of the Italian name Luigi). A pupil of his was Maffeo Verona.
