= Venus and Adonis (Veronese, Augsburg) =

Painting by Paolo Veronese

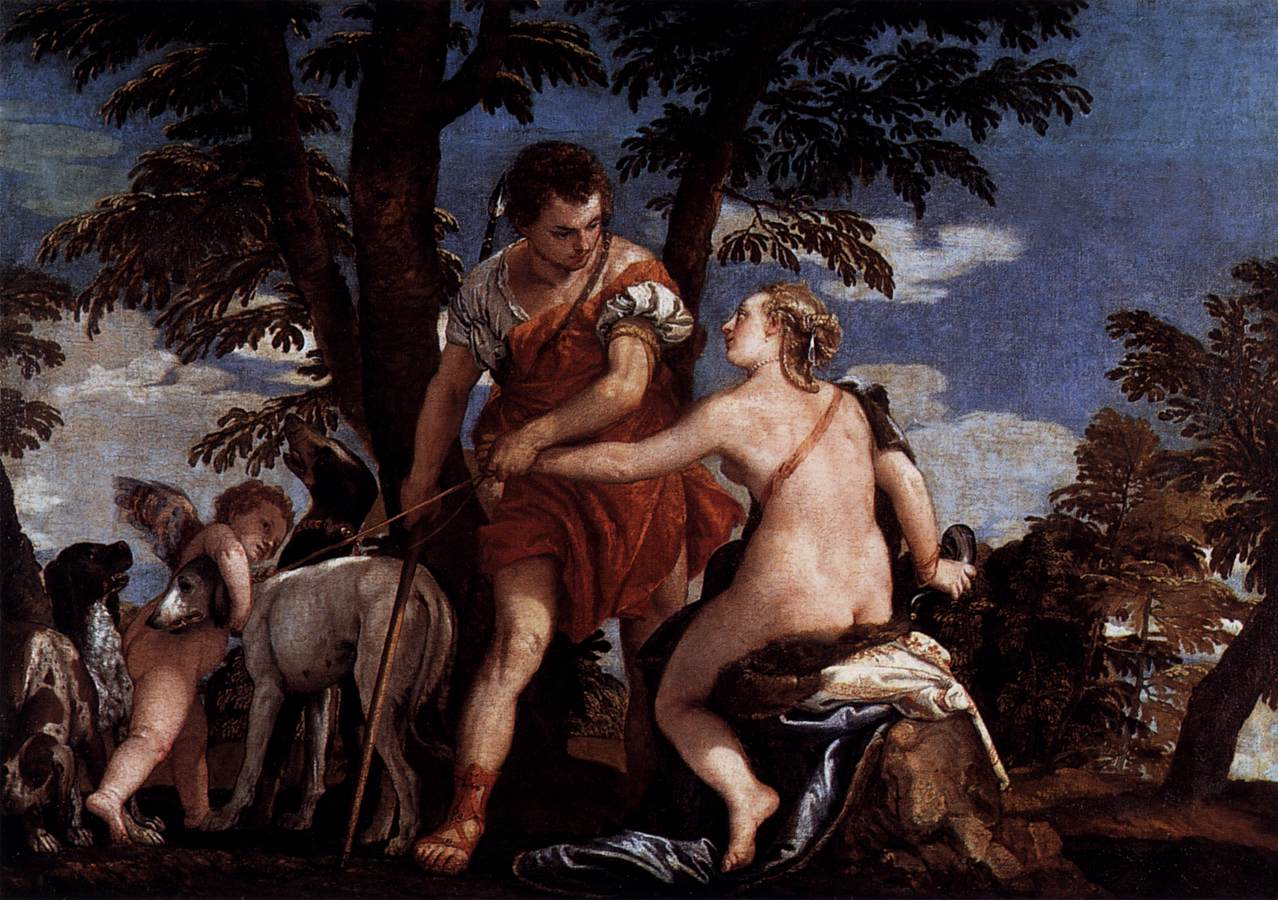
Venus and Adonis (1562) by Paolo Veronese

Venus and Adonis is a 1562 oil painting on canvas by Paolo Veronese, now held at the Staatliche Kunstsammlungen in Augsburg, Germany.

The painting has a mythological subject, showing the moment at which Venus tries to stop Adonis from going hunting after having a premonition of his death. He went on to paint another version of the same subject in 1580, but the style and composition of the two works are completely different. According to some critics, Veronese based the 1562 version on Titian's painting of the subject, which he first encountered through engravings by Cornelis Cort. Veronese puts Venus's shoulders in the same position and the general approach is similar to Titian's, though Veronese's work is less dramatic and more composed, with the characters' relationship based more on looks than physical contact and with Venus stopping Adonis by holding onto his dogs' leads and hiding his hunting horn.

The dimensions of the painting are 123 cm (48.4 in) x 174 cm (68.5 in).
