= Wolfgang Lettl =

German painter

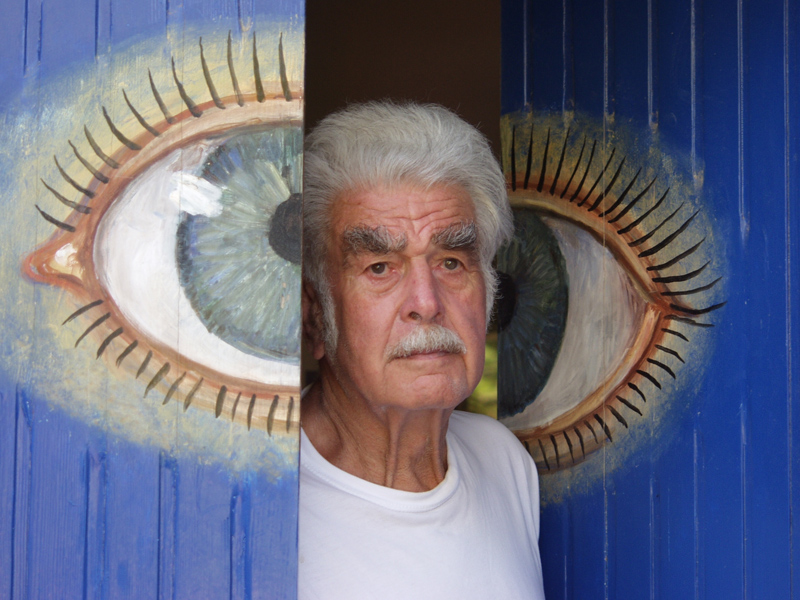
- Wolfgang Lettl (2002)
- Born: 18 December 1919; Augsburg, Germany
- Died: 10 February 2008 (aged 88); Augsburg, Germany
- Known for: Painting
- Movement: Surrealism
- Website: www.lettl.de

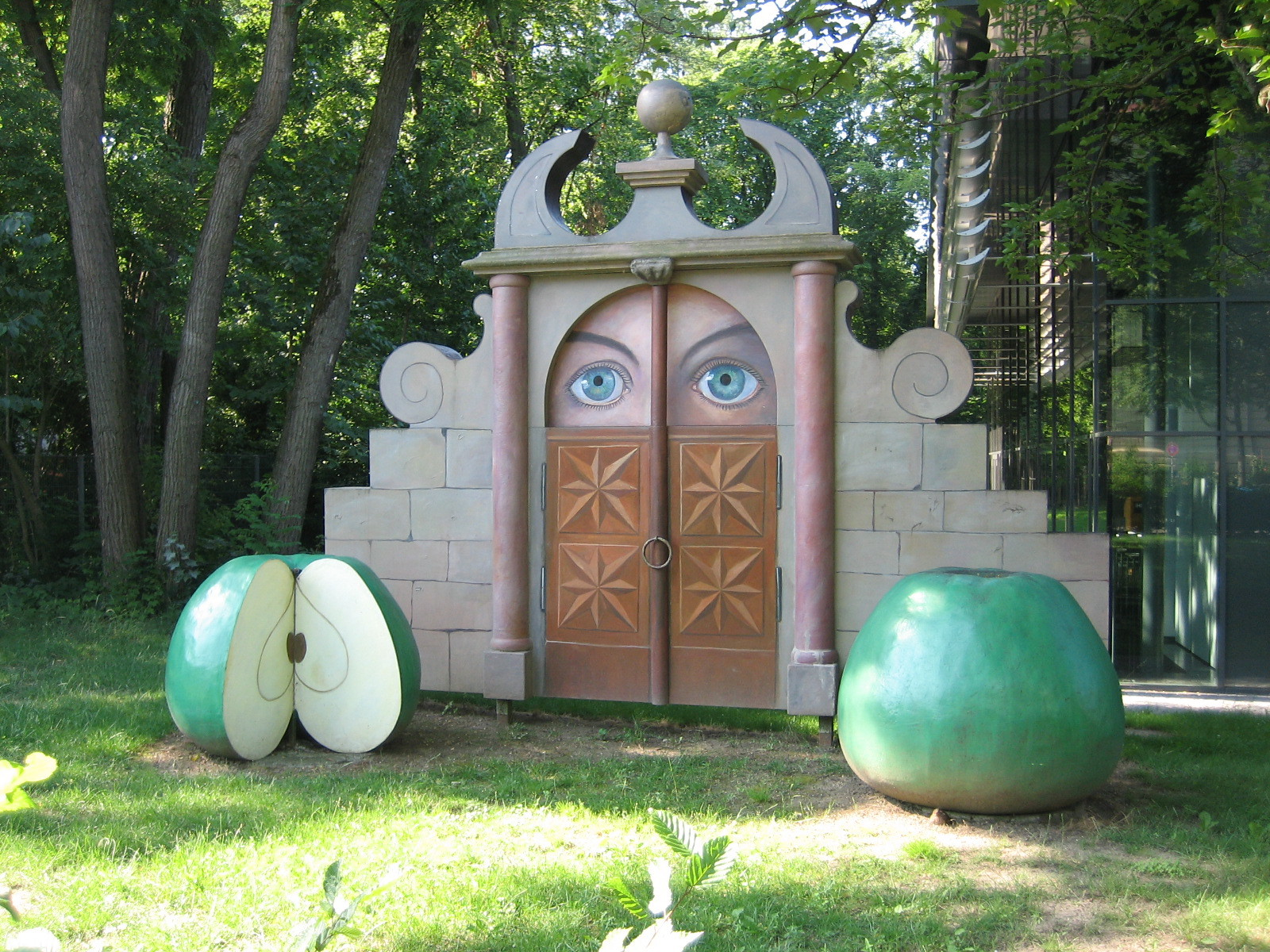
Sculpture by Lettl after one of his paintings

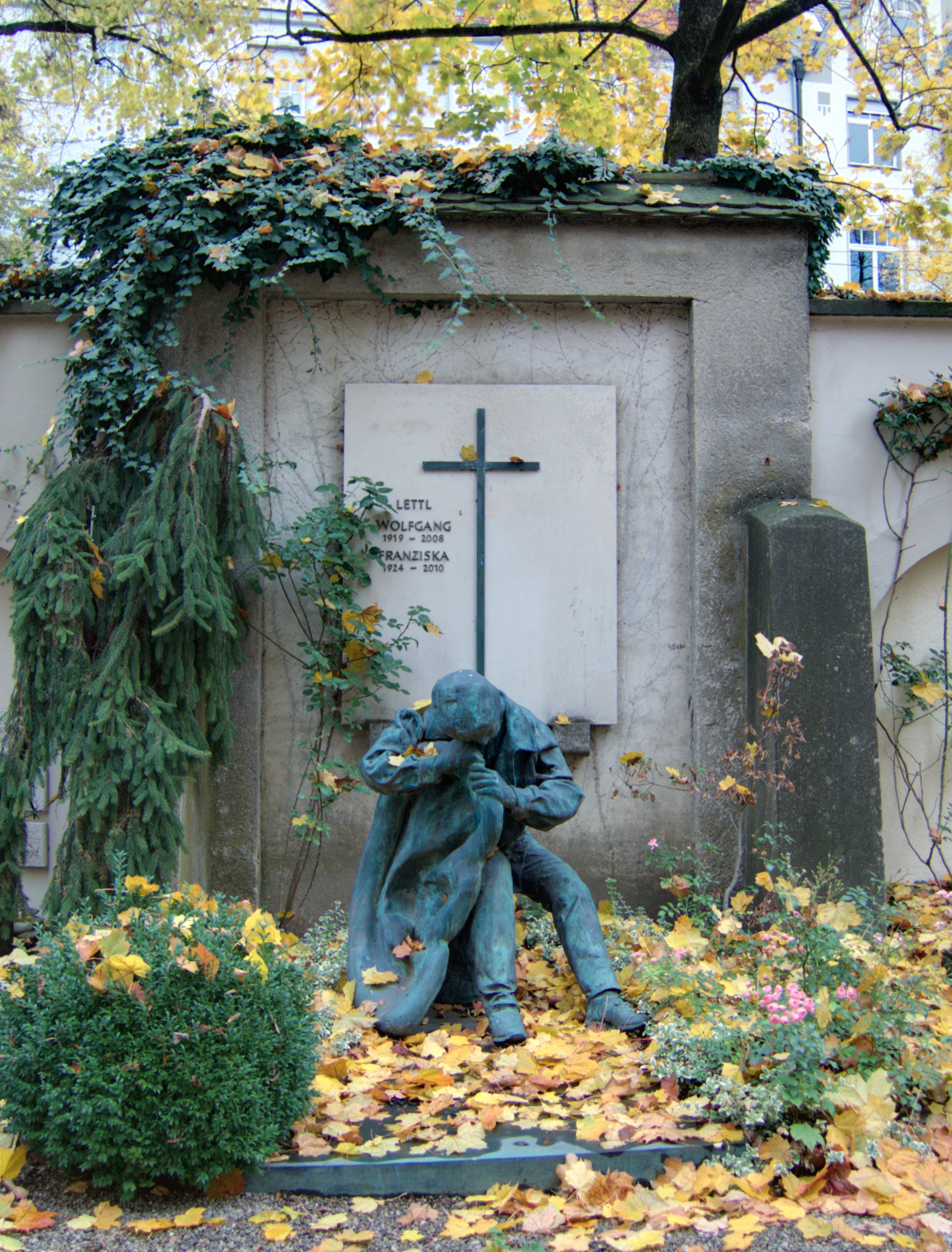
Lettl's grave in Augsburg

Wolfgang Lettl (18 December 1919 – 10 February 2008) was a surrealist painter who was born and who died in Augsburg, Germany. His retrospective was exhibited at the Schaezlerpalais in 2019.

In 1939, at the age of 20, Wolfgang joined the German Army and served as a communications officer in occupied Paris from 1940 to 1943, during which time he worked on his watercolours and first became exposed to surrealism. Later in the war, he became a reconnaissance airman in Norway, where he was captured at the end of the war and held for four months.

He returned to Augsburg in 1945, and worked there as a freelance painter from 1945 to 1948. In 1949, however, the currency reform forced him to turn to construction work to make ends meet. He continued working on his landscapes, portraits and surrealist art while working construction jobs and odd jobs. From 1954 onwards, he was able to concentrate on his art.

He married Franziska Link in 1949.

Success with his freelance art led him to develop his surrealism, and in 1963 he participated in the Grosse Kunstausstellung München (the "Grand Art Exhibition Munich"), becoming a member of the Neue Münchener Künstlergenossenschaft ("New Munich Artists' Cooperative Society"). One-man shows in Germany and abroad followed. In addition to his surrealist work, the landscapes around Manfredonia, his second home in Apulia, Italy, inspired him to sometimes paint in an impressionistic style.

In 1992, on the occasion of a retrospective exhibition at the Toskan Hall of Columns, he offered his paintings to the city of Augsburg on permanent loan. After the opening of the "Lettl Atrium - Museum for Surreal Art" in Augsburg in 1993, Lettl has concentrated on experiments in other media (including film), as well as continuing with his painting. A major retrospective exhibition was held in Augsburg in 2000.
