= Paolo Veronese =

Italian Renaissance painter (1528–1588)

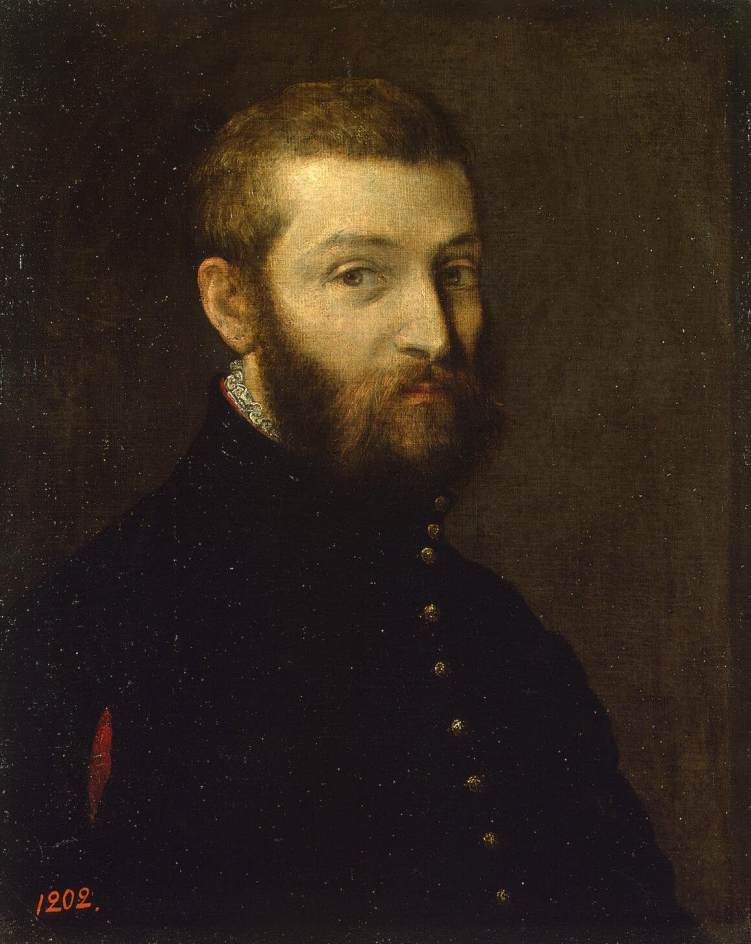
- Self-portrait, 1558–1563, Hermitage Museum
- Born: 1528; Verona, Republic of Venice
- Died: 19 April 1588 (aged 59–60); Venice, Republic of Venice
- Known for: Painting
- Notable work: The Wedding at Cana (1563); The Feast in the House of Levi (1573)
- Movement: Renaissance, Mannerism, Venetian School
- Patrons: Barbarigo family, Barbaro family

Signature
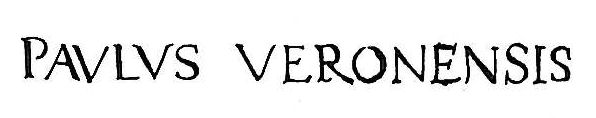

Paolo Caliari (1528 – 19 April 1588), known as Paolo Veronese (/ˌvɛrəˈneɪzeɪ, -zi/ VERR-ə-NAY-zay, -zee, US also /-eɪsi/ -see; Italian: [ˈpaːolo veroˈneːze, -eːse]), was an Italian Renaissance painter based in Venice, known for extremely large history paintings of religion and mythology, such as The Wedding at Cana (1563) and The Feast in the House of Levi (1573). Included with Titian, a generation older, and Tintoretto, a decade senior, Veronese is one of the "great trio that dominated Venetian painting of the cinquecento" and the Late Renaissance in the 16th century. Known as a supreme colorist, and after an early period with Mannerism, Paolo Veronese developed a naturalist style of painting, influenced by Titian.

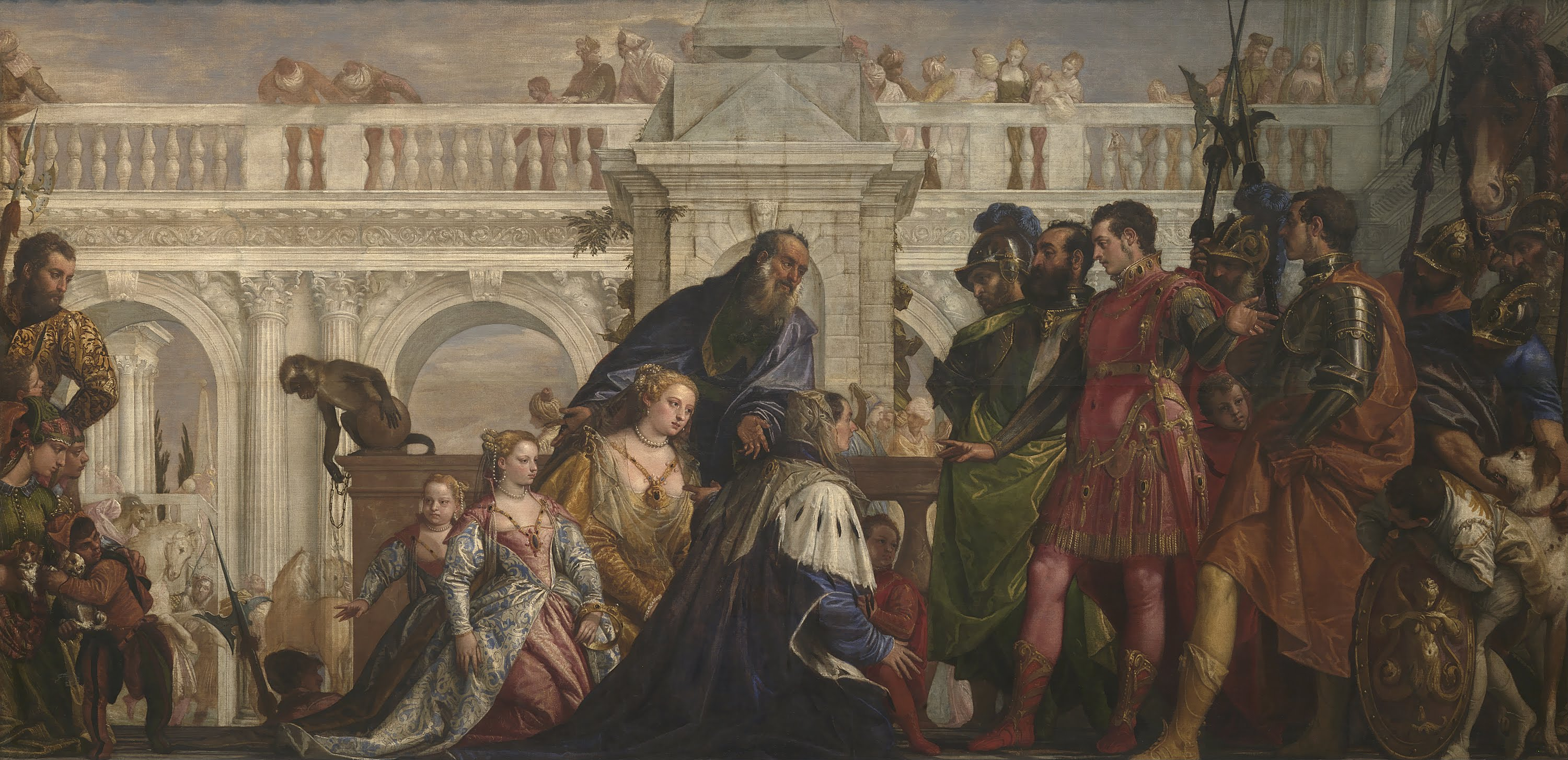
The Family of Darius before Alexander (1565–1570). Oil on canvas, 236.2cm × 475.9 cm, National Gallery, London.

His most famous works are elaborate narrative cycles, executed in a dramatic and colorful style, full of majestic architectural settings and glittering pageantry. His large paintings of biblical feasts, crowded with figures, painted for the refectories of monasteries in Venice and Verona are especially famous, and he was also the leading Venetian painter of ceilings. Most of these works remain in situ, or at least in Venice, and his representation in most museums is mainly composed of smaller works such as portraits that do not always show him at his best or most typical.

He has always been appreciated for "the chromatic brilliance of his palette, the splendor and sensibility of his brushwork, the aristocratic elegance of his figures, and the magnificence of his spectacle", but his work has been felt "not to permit expression of the profound, the human, or the sublime", and of the "great trio" he has often been the least appreciated by modern criticism. Nonetheless, "many of the greatest artists ... may be counted among his admirers, including Rubens, Watteau, Tiepolo, Delacroix, and Renoir".

== Life and work ==
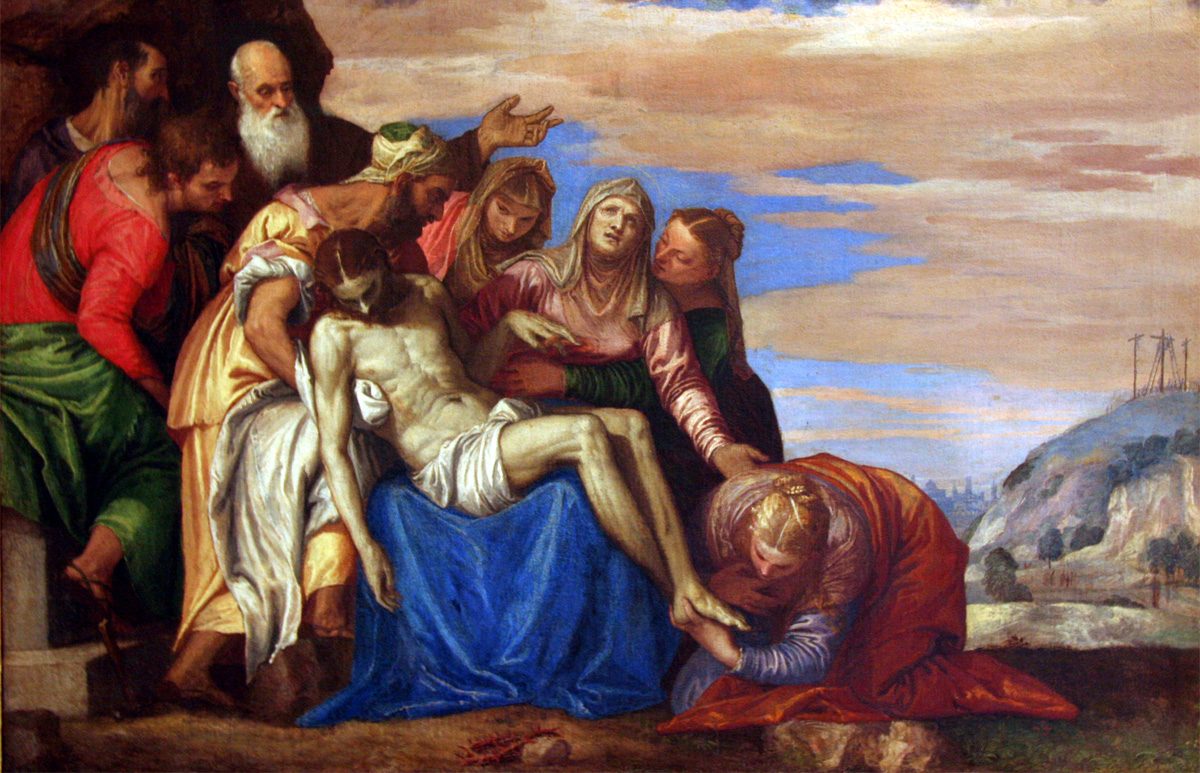
Deposition of Christ, c. 1547, Castelvecchio Museum

=== Birth and names ===
Veronese took his usual name from his birthplace of Verona, then the largest possession of Venice on the mainland. The census in Verona attests that Veronese was born sometime in 1528 to a stonecutter, or spezapreda in the Venetian language, named Gabriele, and his wife Caterina. He was their fifth child. It was common for surnames to be taken from a father's profession, and thus Veronese was known as Paolo Spezapreda. He later changed his name to Paolo Caliari, because his mother was the illegitimate daughter of a nobleman called Antonio Caliari. His earliest known painting is signed "P. Caliari F., "the first known instance in which he used this surname", and after using "Paolo Veronese" for several years in Venice, after about 1575 he resumed signing his paintings as "Paolo Caliari". He was often called "Paolo Veronese" before the last century to distinguish him from another painter from Verona, "Alessandro Veronese", now known as Alessandro Turchi (1578–1649).

=== Youth ===
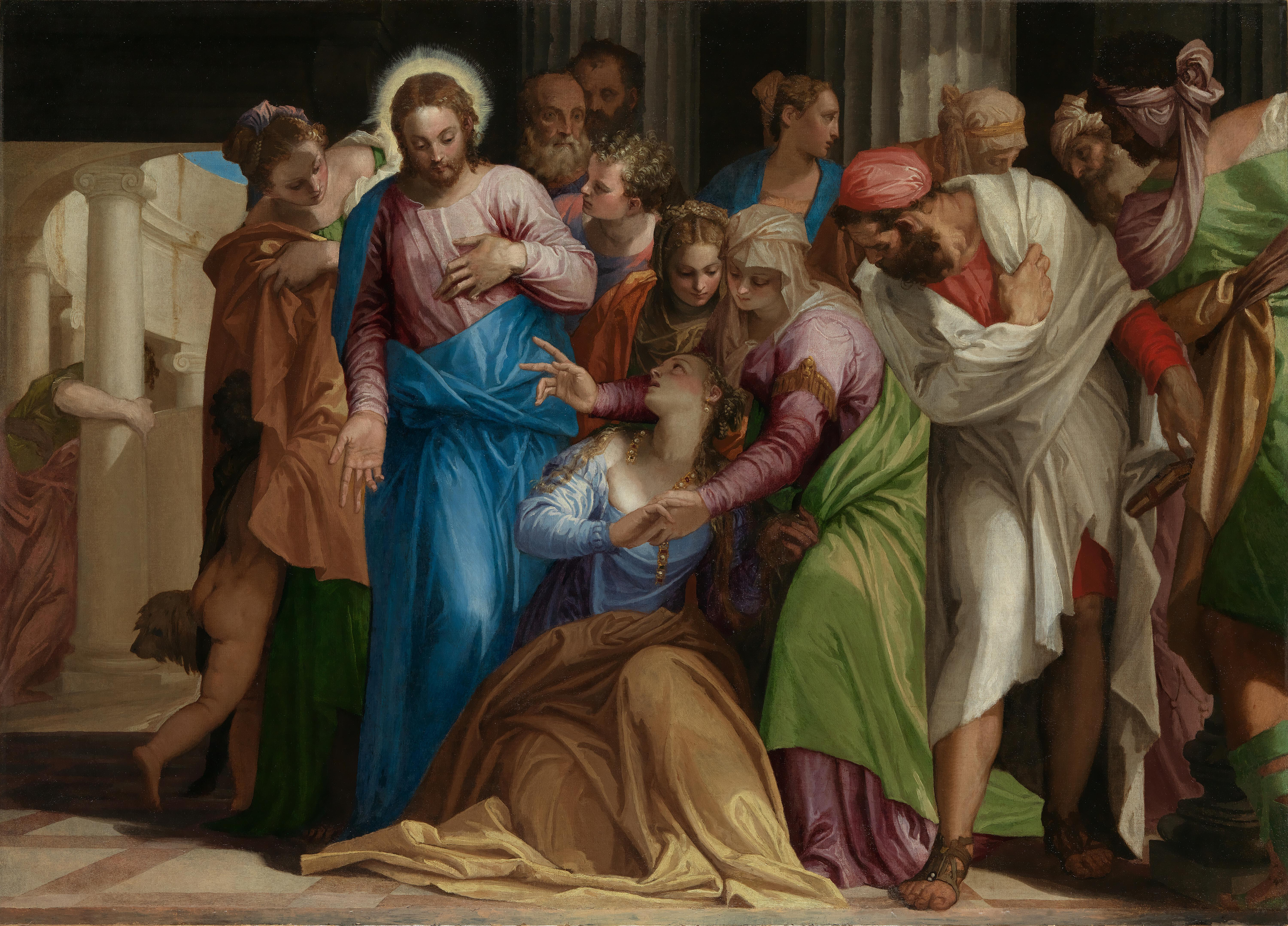
The Conversion of Mary Magdalene, c. 1548, National Gallery

By 1541, Veronese was apprenticed with Antonio Badile, who was later to become his father-in-law, and in 1544 was an apprentice of Giovanni Francesco Caroto; both were leading painters in Verona. An altarpiece painted by Badile in 1543 includes striking passages that were most likely the work of his fifteen-year-old apprentice; Veronese's precocious gifts soon surpassed the level of the workshop, and by 1544 he was no longer residing with Badile. Although trained in the culture of Mannerism then popular in Parma, he soon developed his own preference for a more radiant palette.

In his late teens he painted works for important churches in Verona, and in 1551 he was commissioned by the Venetian branch of the important Giustiniani family to paint the altarpiece for their chapel in the church of San Francesco della Vigna, which was then being entirely rebuilt to the design of Jacopo Sansovino. In the same year he worked on the decoration of the Villa Soranzo near Treviso, with his fellow Veronese Giovanni Battista Zelotti and Anselmo Canneri; only fragments of the frescos remain, but they seem to have been important in establishing his reputation. The description by Carlo Ridolfi nearly a century later mentions that one of the mythological subjects was The Family of Darius before Alexander, the rare subject in Veronese's grandest treatment of secular history, now in the National Gallery, London.

In 1552 Cardinal Ercole Gonzaga, great-uncle of the ruling Guglielmo Gonzaga, Duke of Mantua, commissioned an altarpiece, Temptation of St. Anthony for Mantua Cathedral (now at the Musée des Beaux-Arts de Caen in Caen, France), which Veronese painted in situ. He doubtless used his time in Mantua to study the ceilings by Giulio Romano; it was as a painter of ceiling frescos that he would initially make his mark in Venice, where he based himself permanently from the following year.

=== Venice ===
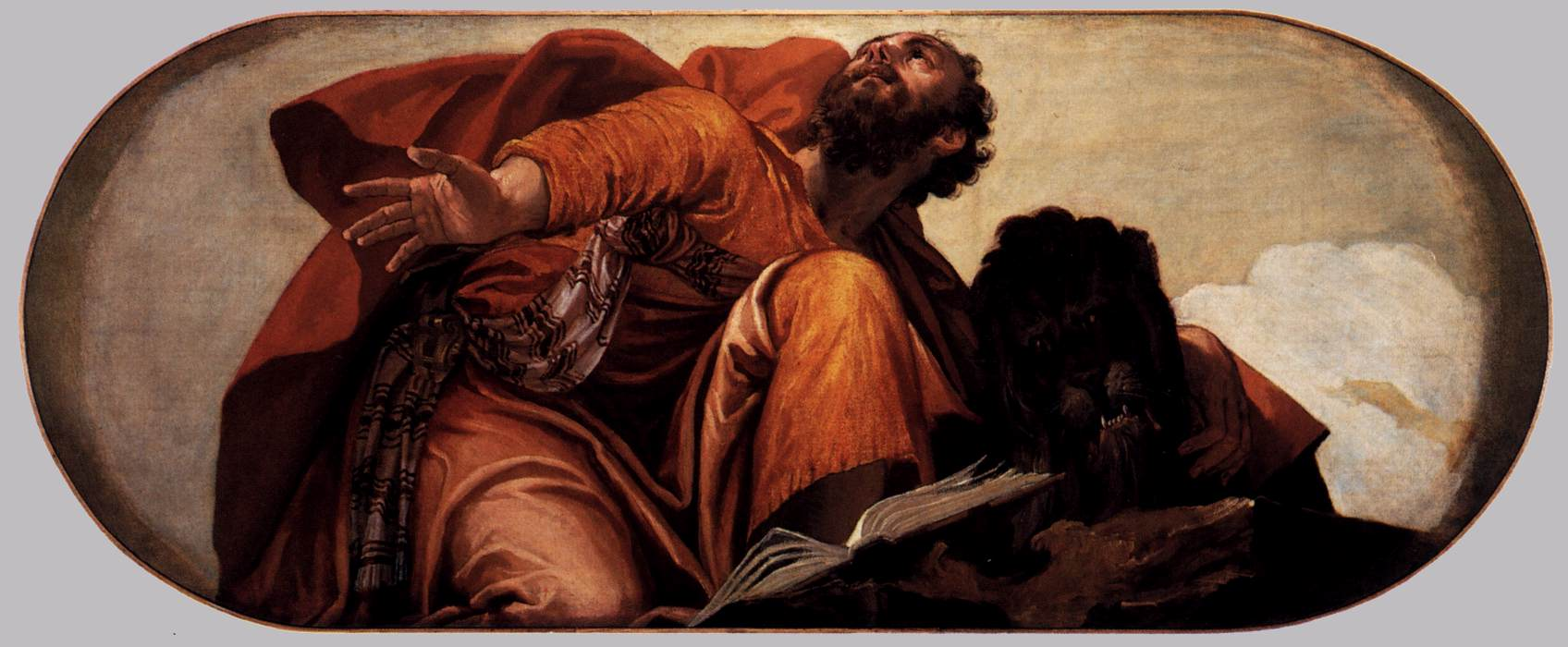
St Mark, San Sebastiano (1556–57)

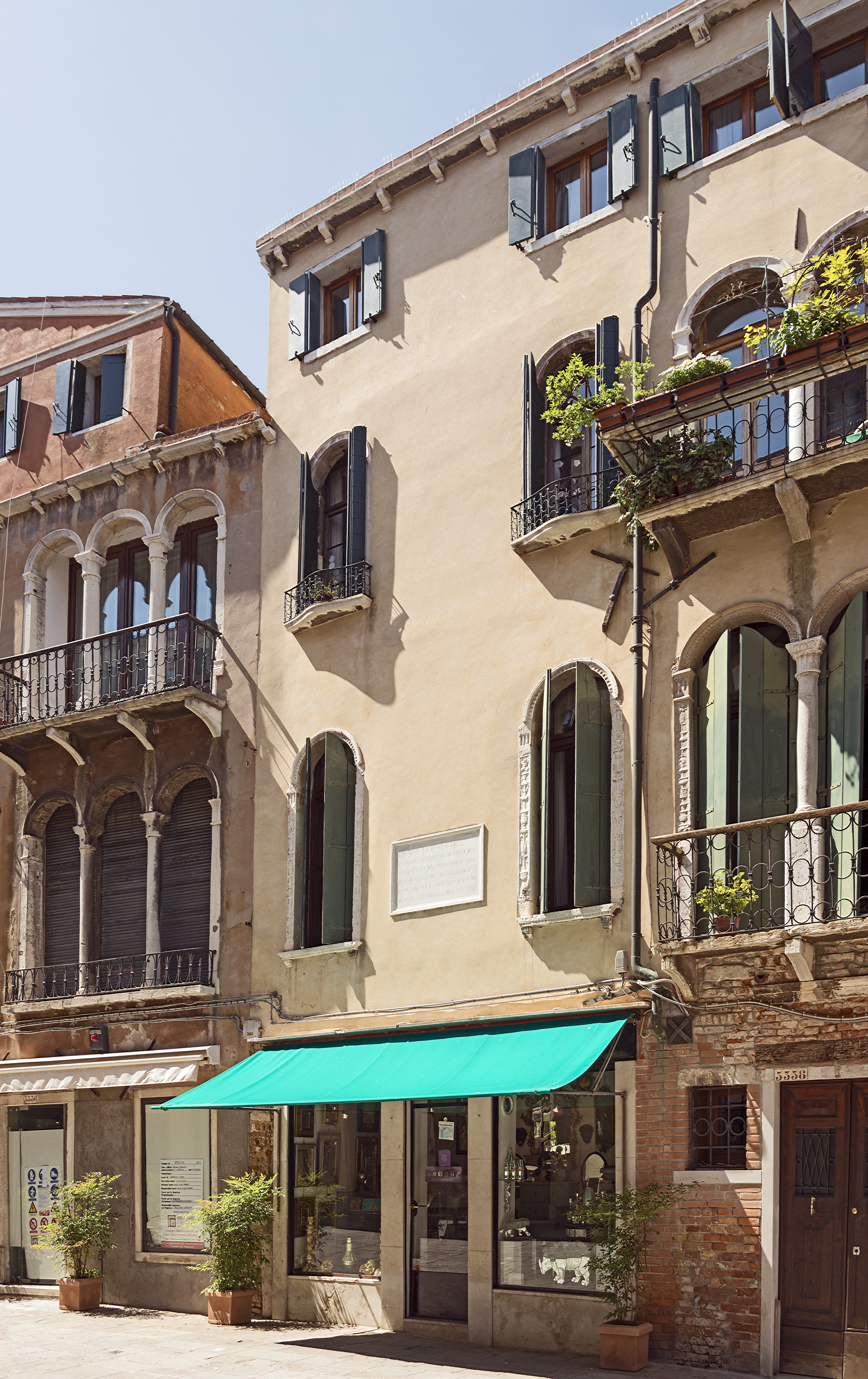
House of Veronese in Venice

Veronese moved to Venice in 1553 after obtaining his first state commission, ceilings in fresco decorating the Sala dei Consiglio dei Dieci (the Hall of the Council of Ten) and the adjoining Sala dei Tre Capi del Consiglio in the Doge's Palace, in the new rooms replacing those lost in the fire of 1547. His panel of Jupiter Hurling Thunderbolts at the Vices for the former is now in the Louvre. He then painted a History of Esther on the ceiling for the church of San Sebastiano (1556–57). It was these ceiling paintings and those of 1557 in the Marciana Library (for which he was awarded a prize judged by Titian and Sansovino) that established him as a master among his Venetian contemporaries. Already these works indicate Veronese's mastery in reflecting both the subtle foreshortening of the figures of Correggio and the heroism of those by Michelangelo.

=== Villa Barbaro and refectory paintings ===
By 1556, Veronese was commissioned to paint the first of his monumental banquet scenes, the Feast in the House of Simon, which would not be concluded until 1570. Owing to its scattered composition and lack of focus, however, it was not his most successful refectory mural. In the late 1550s, during a break in his work for San Sebastiano, Veronese decorated the Villa Barbaro in Maser, a newly finished building by the architect Andrea Palladio. The frescoes were designed to unite humanistic culture with Christian spirituality; wall paintings included portraits of the Barbaro family, and the ceilings opened to blue skies and mythological figures. Veronese's decorations employed complex perspective and trompe-l'œil, and resulted in a luminescent and inspired visual poetry. The encounter between architect and artist was a triumph.

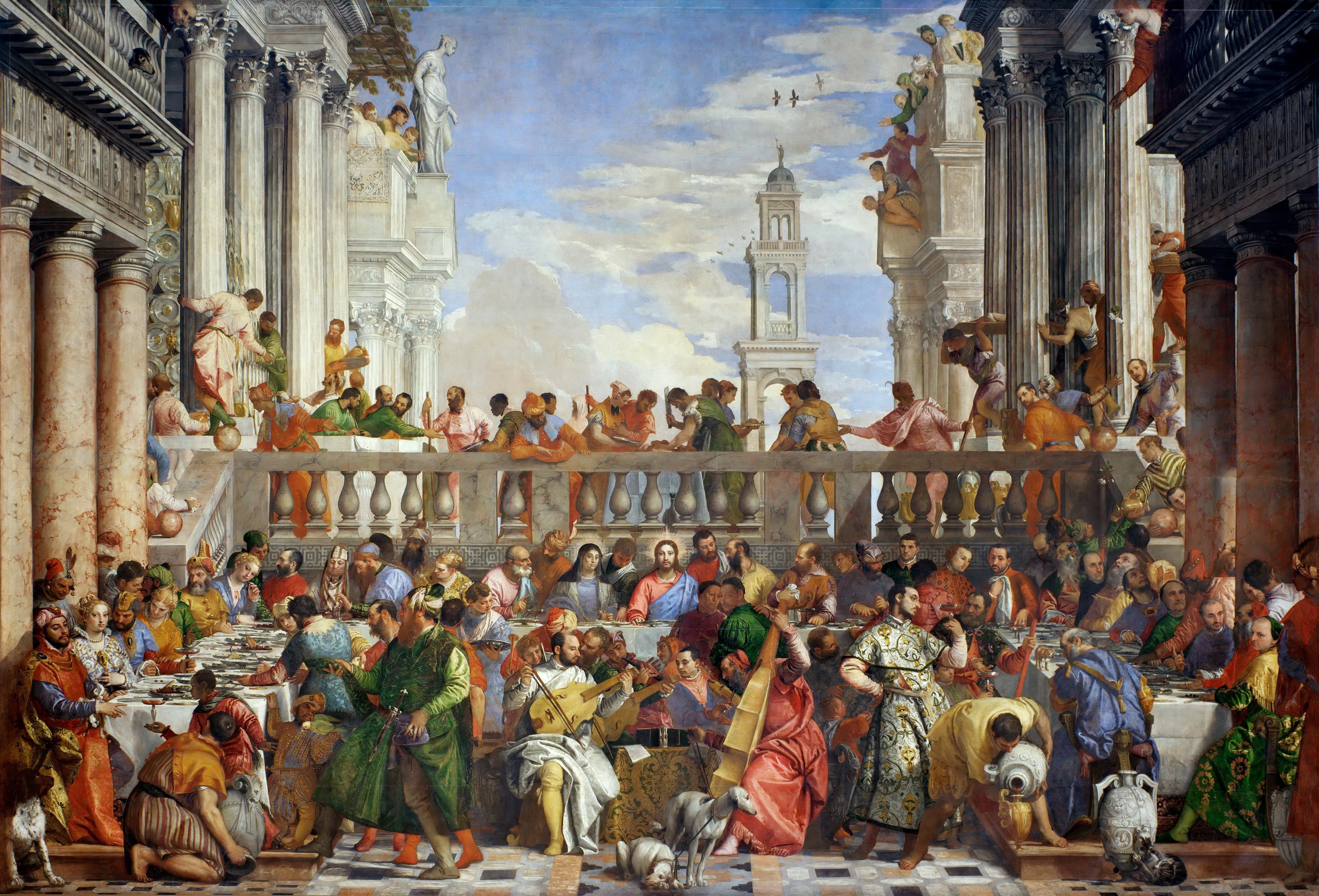
The Wedding at Cana, 1562–1563, Louvre

The Wedding at Cana, painted in 1562–1563, was also a collaboration with Palladio. It was commissioned by the Benedictine monks for the San Giorgio Maggiore Monastery, on the eponymous small island across from Saint Mark's, in Venice. The contract insisted on the huge size (to cover 66 square meters), and that the pigment and colors should be of premium quality. For example, the contract specified that the blues should contain the precious mineral lapis-lazuli. The contract also specified that the painting should include as many figures as possible. There are a number of portraits (including those of Titian and Tintoretto, as well as a self-portrait of Veronese) staged upon a canvas surface nearly ten meters wide. The scene, taken from the New Testament Book of John, II, 1–11, represents the first miracle performed by Jesus, the making of wine from water, at a marriage in Cana, Galilee. The foreground celebration, a frieze of figures painted in the most shimmering finery, is flanked by two sets of stairs leading back to a terrace, Roman colonnades, and a brilliant sky.

In the refectory paintings, as in The Family of Darius before Alexander (1565–1570), Veronese arranged the architecture to run mostly parallel to the picture plane, accentuating the processional character of the composition. The artist's decorative genius was to recognize that dramatic perspectival effects would have been tiresome in a living room or chapel, and that the narrative of the picture could best be absorbed as a colorful diversion. These paintings offer little in the representation of emotion; rather, they illustrate the carefully composed movement of their subjects along a primarily horizontal axis. Most of all they are about the incandescence of light and color. The exaltation of such visual effects may have been a reflection of the artist's personal well-being, for in 1565 Veronese married Elena Badile, the daughter of his first master, and by whom he would eventually have a daughter and four sons.

Also painted between 1565 and 1570 is his Madonna and Child with St. Elizabeth, the Infant St. John the Baptist, and St. Justina (now in the Timken Museum of Art, San Diego). In this work St. Justina, a patroness of Padua and Venice, is at the right with the Blessed Virgin Mother and the Christ child in the center. In contrast to Italian works of a century earlier the infant is rendered convincingly as an infant. What makes one stop and take notice in this painting is the infant's reaching out to St. Justina, since a baby of this age would normally limit his gaze to his mother. Completing the work is St. Elizabeth, the cousin of Mary and mother of St. John the Baptist, located on the left. The artist delicately balances the forms of the extended Holy Family and renders them using a superb balance of warm and cool colors.

=== The Feast in the House of Levi ===
In 1573 Veronese completed the commission for The Feast in the House of Levi, a last-supper painting for the rear wall of the refectory at the Basilica di Santi Giovanni e Paolo, Castello, Venice. Originally titled The Last Supper, the painting was to replace a Titian painting burnt in a fire; Veronese's oversized (5.55m x 12.80m) replacement depicted a Last Supper banquet scene that included German soldiers, dwarves, and animals – the human and animal exotica usual to Veronese's representational narratives. Artistically, The Feast in the House of Levi indicates Veronese's technical development in using intense and luminous colors for texture, attention to narrative coherence, the acute representation of human emotion, and the psychologically subtle interplay occurring among the characters who crowd the scene.

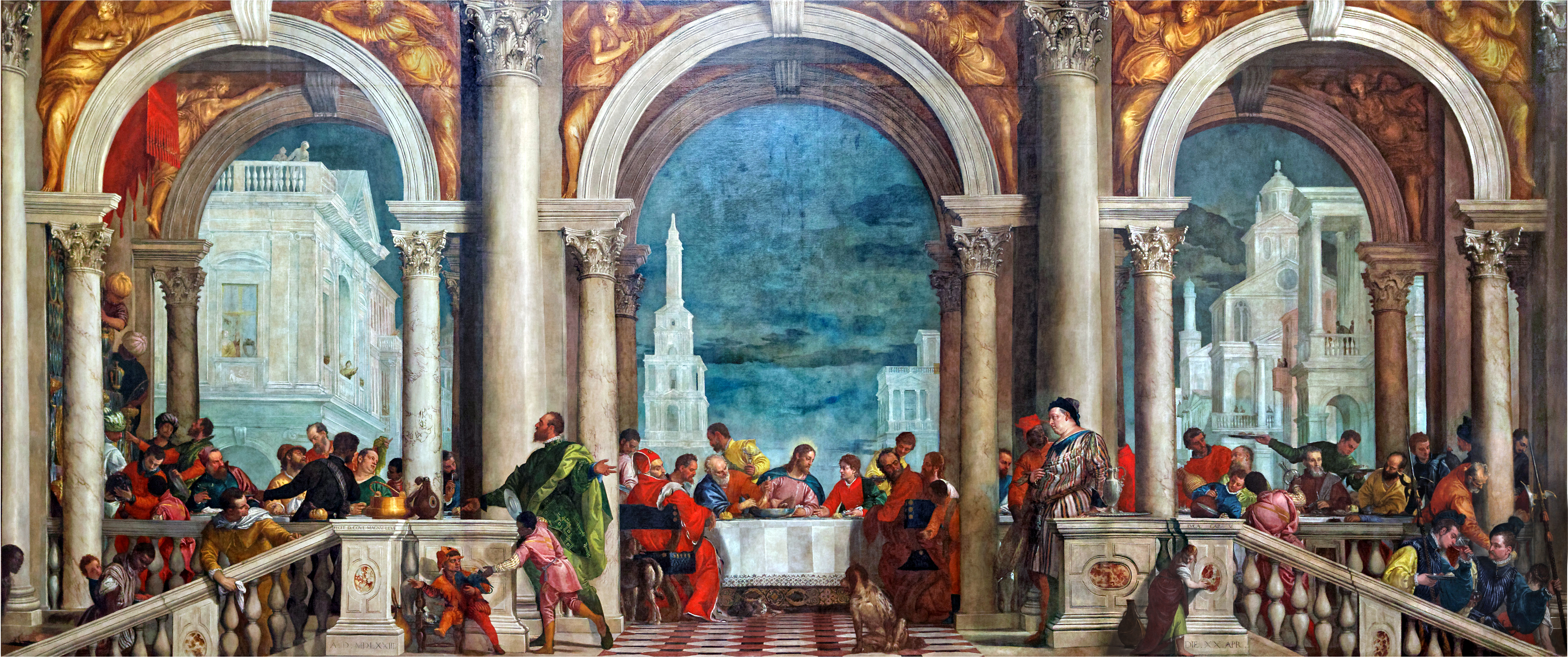
The Feast in the House of Levi (1573) featured people and animals that the Inquisition perceived as heretical. The Inquisitors' investigation found no heresy, yet ordered Paolo Veronese to re-title the painting something other than The Last Supper, the original title.

Given the subject of the painting, the biblical Last Supper, the humanistic depictions of the characters lacked the piousness usual to Roman Catholic art depicting the Christ character and the events of his life; and the Inquisition readily noticed Veronese's irreligiosity. By the 1570s, the theology of the Counter-Reformation had given legal authority to Roman Catholic doctrine in Venice, which was a new, political development for an artist such as Veronese. In the Venetian republic of the Late–Renaissance, for an artist, painting crowd scenes had acquired political ramifications regarding who and what appeared in a religious painting commissioned from him, regardless of the patron or patroness.

A decade earlier, the Benedictine monks who commissioned The Wedding at Cana (1563) had directed Veronese to freely include as many human figures as would fit in the banquet scene. In contrast, a decade later, Veronese encountered legal, religious constraints that determined the suitability (theological, political, sociological) of who and what he depicted in a painting—thus, on 18 July 1573, Veronese was summoned before the Venetian Holy Inquisition to explain the presence of what Church doctrine considered characters, animals, and indecorum extraneous to an image of the Last Supper of the Christ.

The tribunal's interrogation of Veronese was cautionary, rather than punitive; political, rather than judicial; nonetheless, Veronese explained to the Inquisitiors that "we painters take the same liberties as poets and madmen" in telling a story. Although the Inquisition's tribunal ordered Veronese to repaint the last-supper scene, he opposed their remedy to his theological offences, yet was compelled to re-title the painting from the sacramental The Last Supper to The Feast in the House of Levi. That an artist, such as Veronese, had successfully perdured against the Inquisition's implied accusation of heresy, indicated he had the discreet political support of a patrician patron of the arts.

== Assessment ==
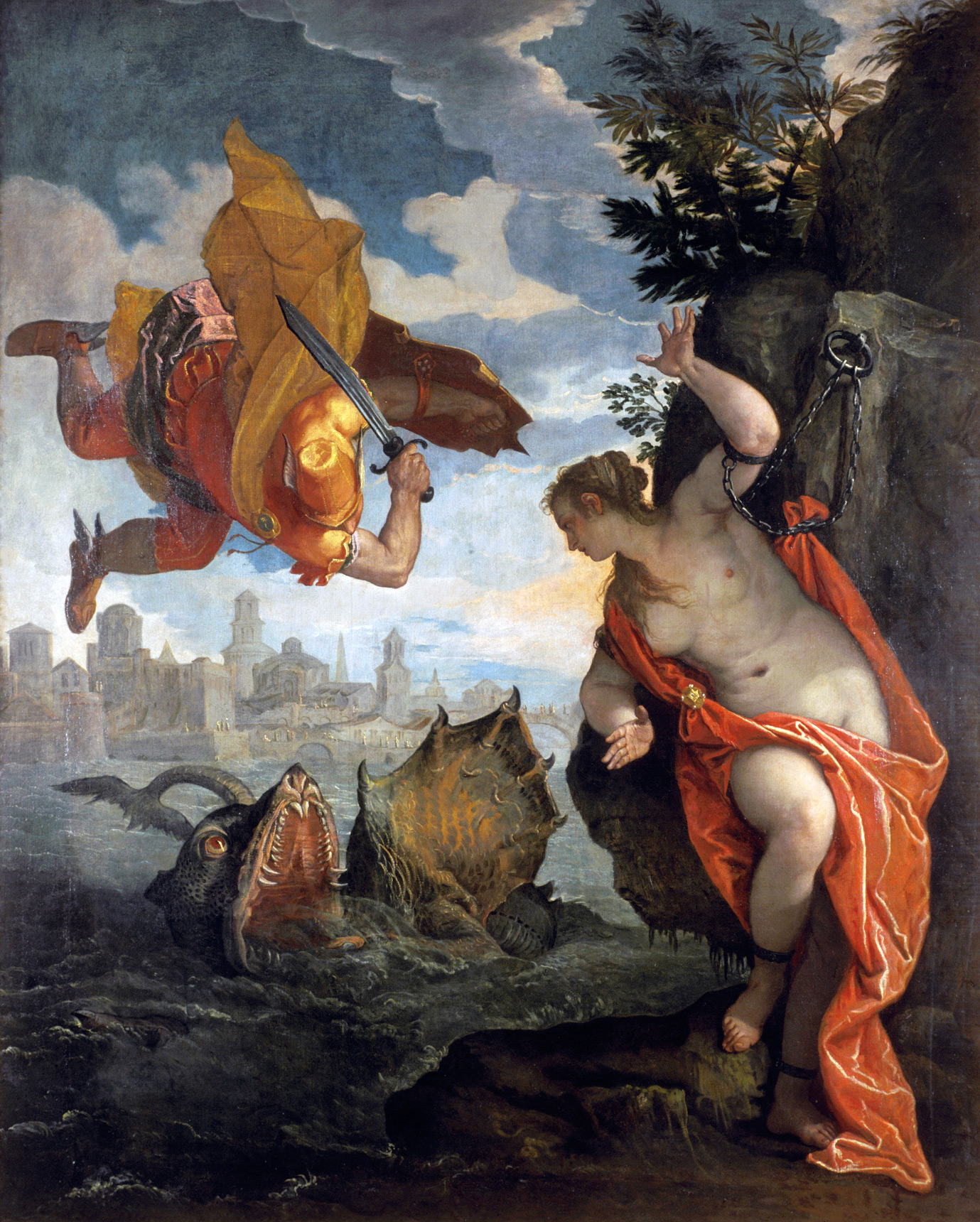
Perseus Freeing Andromeda, 1576–1578 (Musée des beaux-arts, Rennes)

An artist's biography of Paolo Veronese was included in the second edition of the Lives of the Most Excellent Painters, Sculptors, and Architects (1568), by Giorgio Vasari, with improved coverage of the painters of the Venetian school.

A fuller biography of Veronese had to await Le maraviglie dell'arte ovvero le vite degli illustri pittori Veneti e dello stato (1648), by Carlo Ridolfi, a compilation of the Venetian School painters. Ridolfi said that Veronese's painting of The Feast in the House of Levi (1573) is "by far, the most important source for our knowledge of his art" because "it gave rein to joy, made beauty majestic, made laughter, itself, more festive".

In 2014, the art historian Charles Hope wrote of Veronese's strengths and weaknesses: "He is notable above all as a colorist who used a range of bright hues with a boldness unmatched in his time and scarcely equaled since", but because his use of color "was often calculated to create a harmonious overall effect rather than to single out the main protagonists", his paintings convey little narrative drama. According to Hope, "the effect is sumptuous, seductive but ultimately excessive and a little monotonous, rather like a visit to a patisserie."

In Paintings in the Louvre (1987), Lawrence Gowing's modern assessment of Paolo Veronese's artistic achievement is that:

The French had no doubts, as the critic Théophile Gautier wrote in 1860, that Veronese was the greatest colorist who ever lived—greater than Titian, Rubens, or Rembrandt because he established the harmony of natural tones in place of the modeling in dark and light that remained the method of academic chiaroscuro. Delacroix wrote that Veronese made light without violent contrasts, "which we are always told is impossible, and maintained the strength of hue in shadow".

This innovation could not be better described. Veronese's bright outdoor harmonies enlightened and inspired the whole nineteenth century. He was the foundation of modern painting. But whether his style is in fact naturalistic, as the Impressionists thought, or a most subtle and beautiful imaginative invention must remain a question for each age to answer for itself.

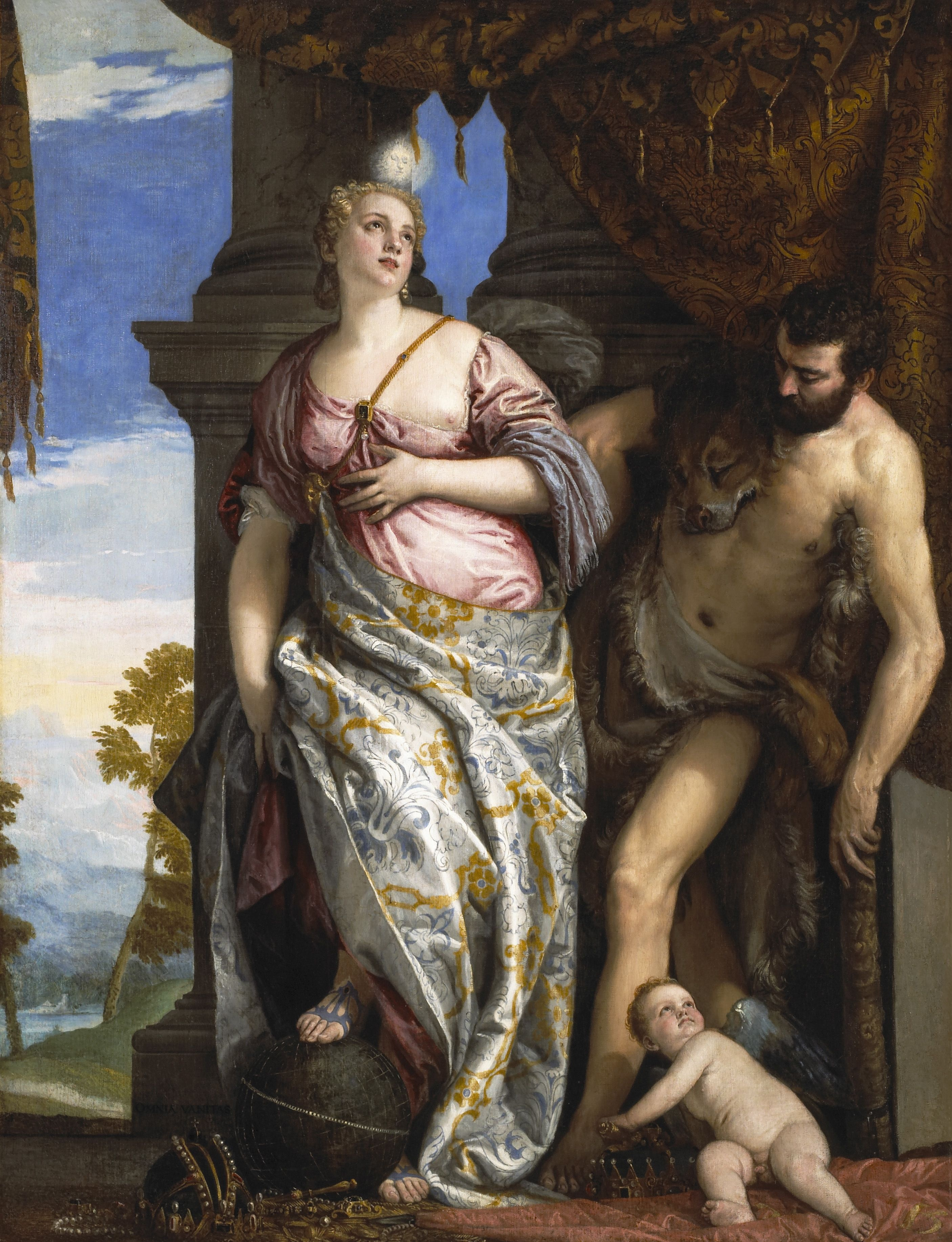
Allegory of Wisdom and Strength, c. 1565

=== Gallery ===
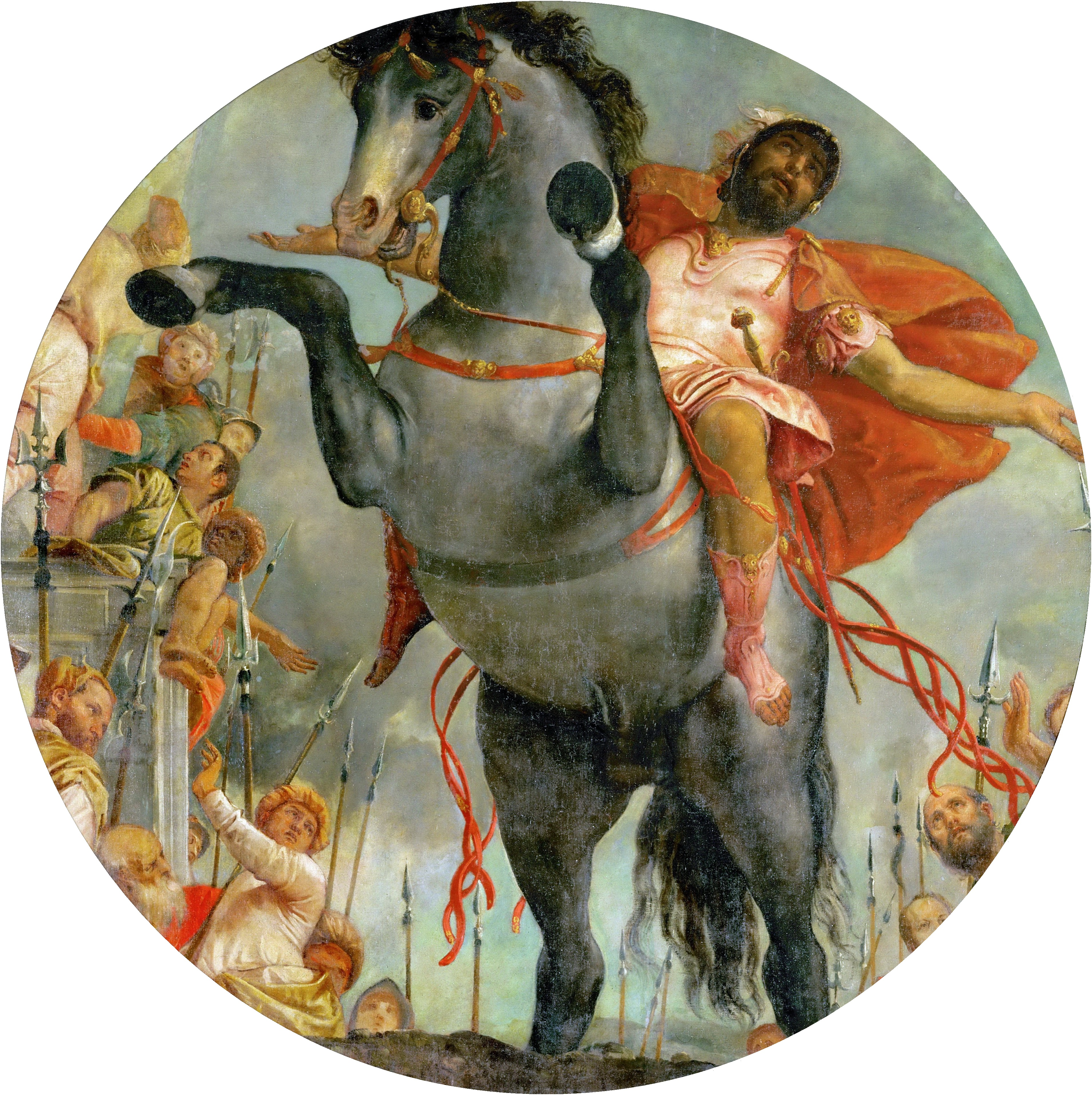
The Sacrificial Death of Marcus Curtius, c. 1550–1552

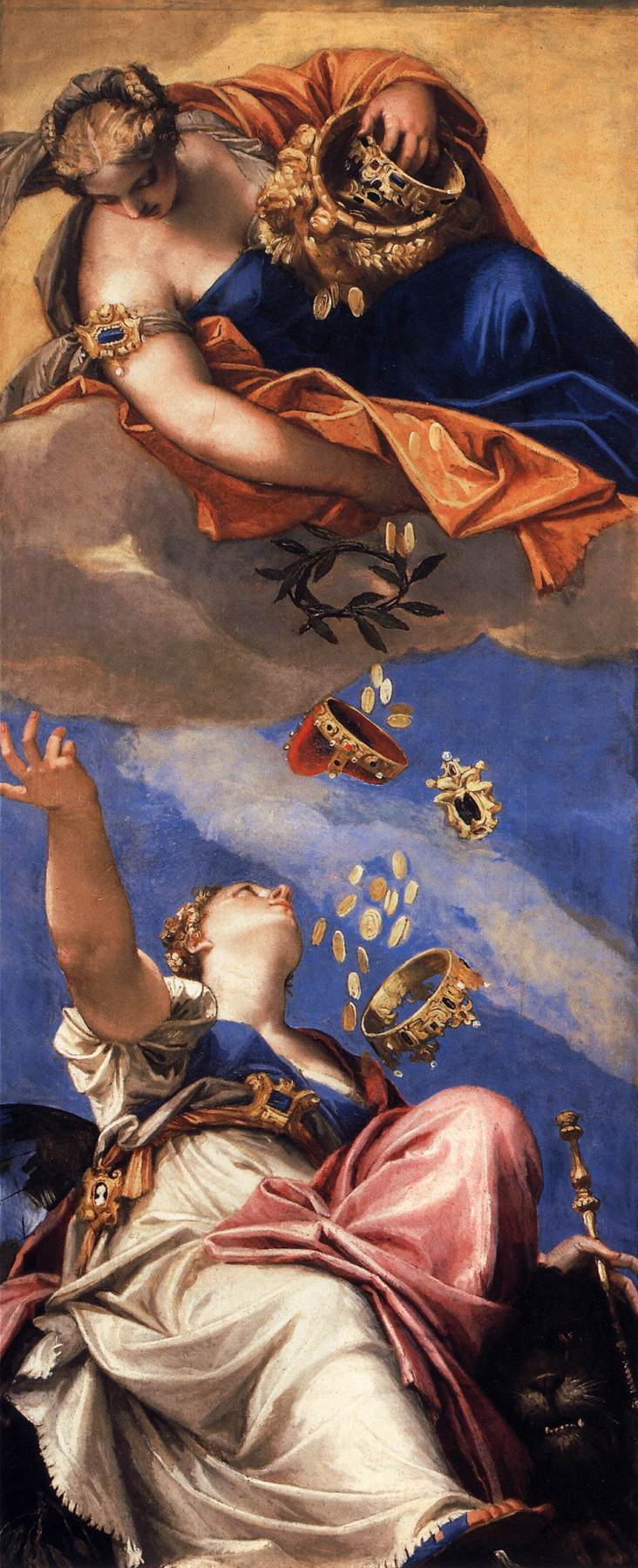
Juno Showering Gifts on Venetia, c. 1554–1556, Doge's Palace

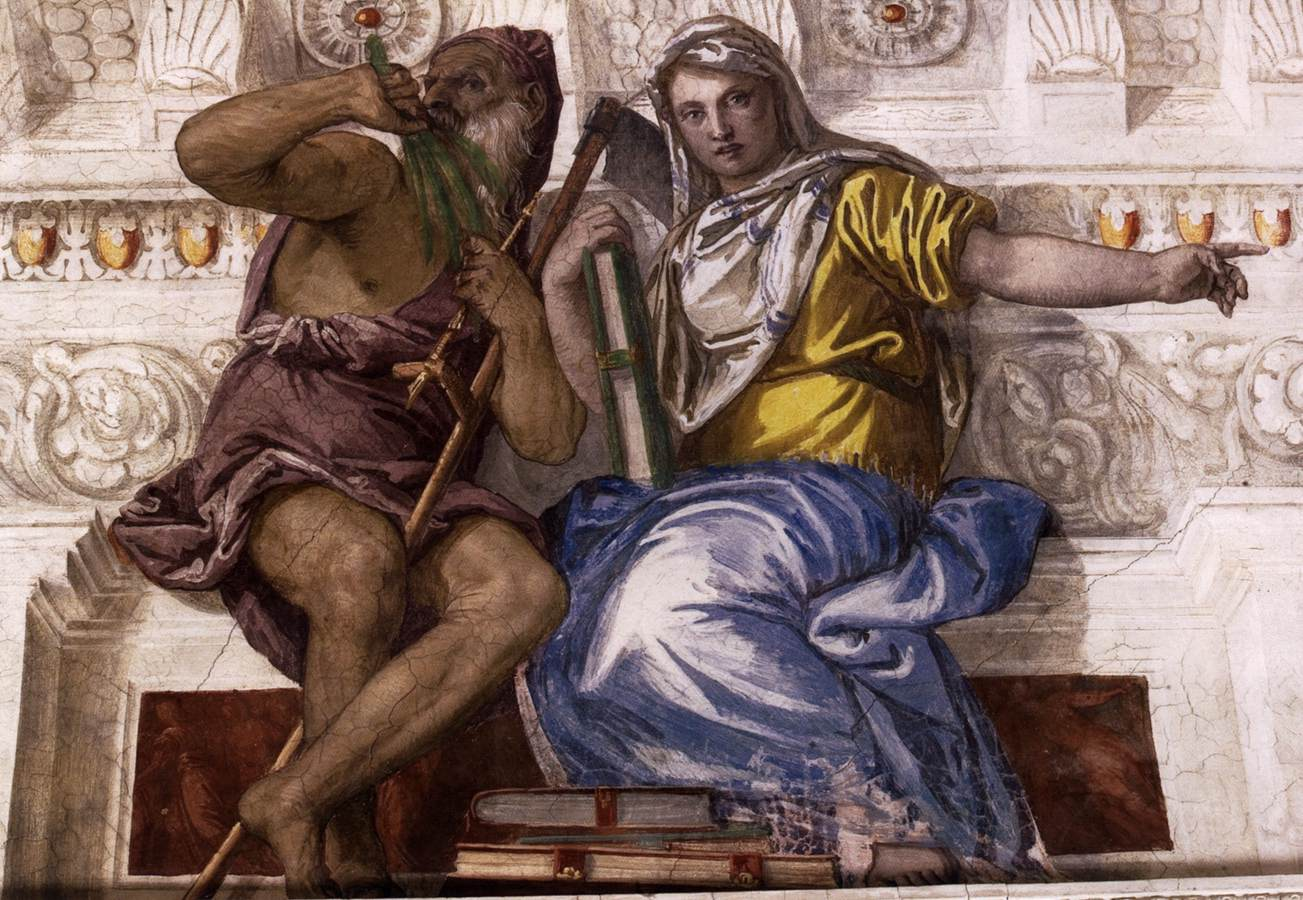
Saturn (Time) and Historia, Villa Barbaro

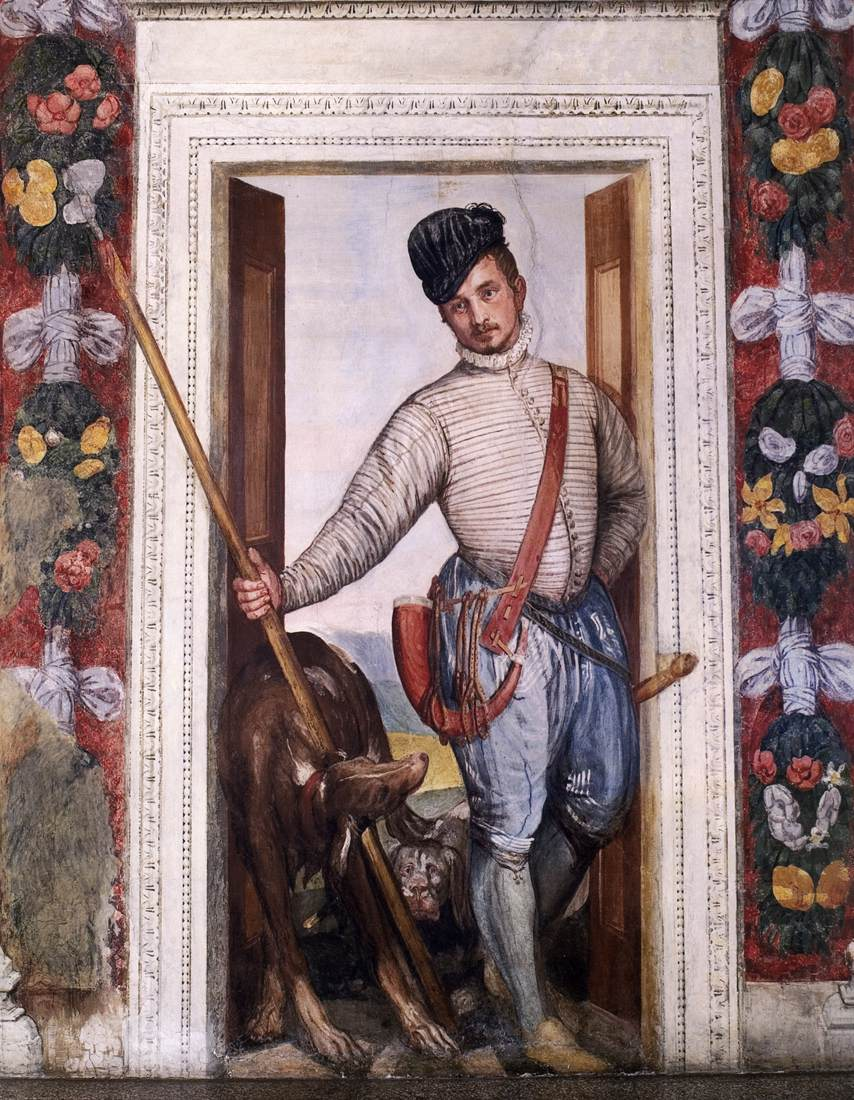
Nobleman in Hunting Attire, Villa Barbaro

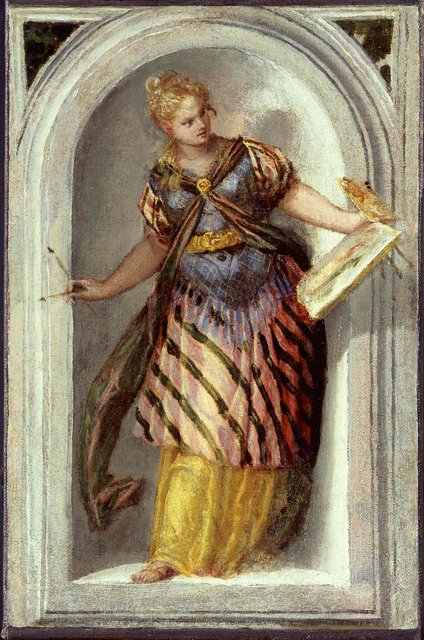
Allegory of Painting, 1560s

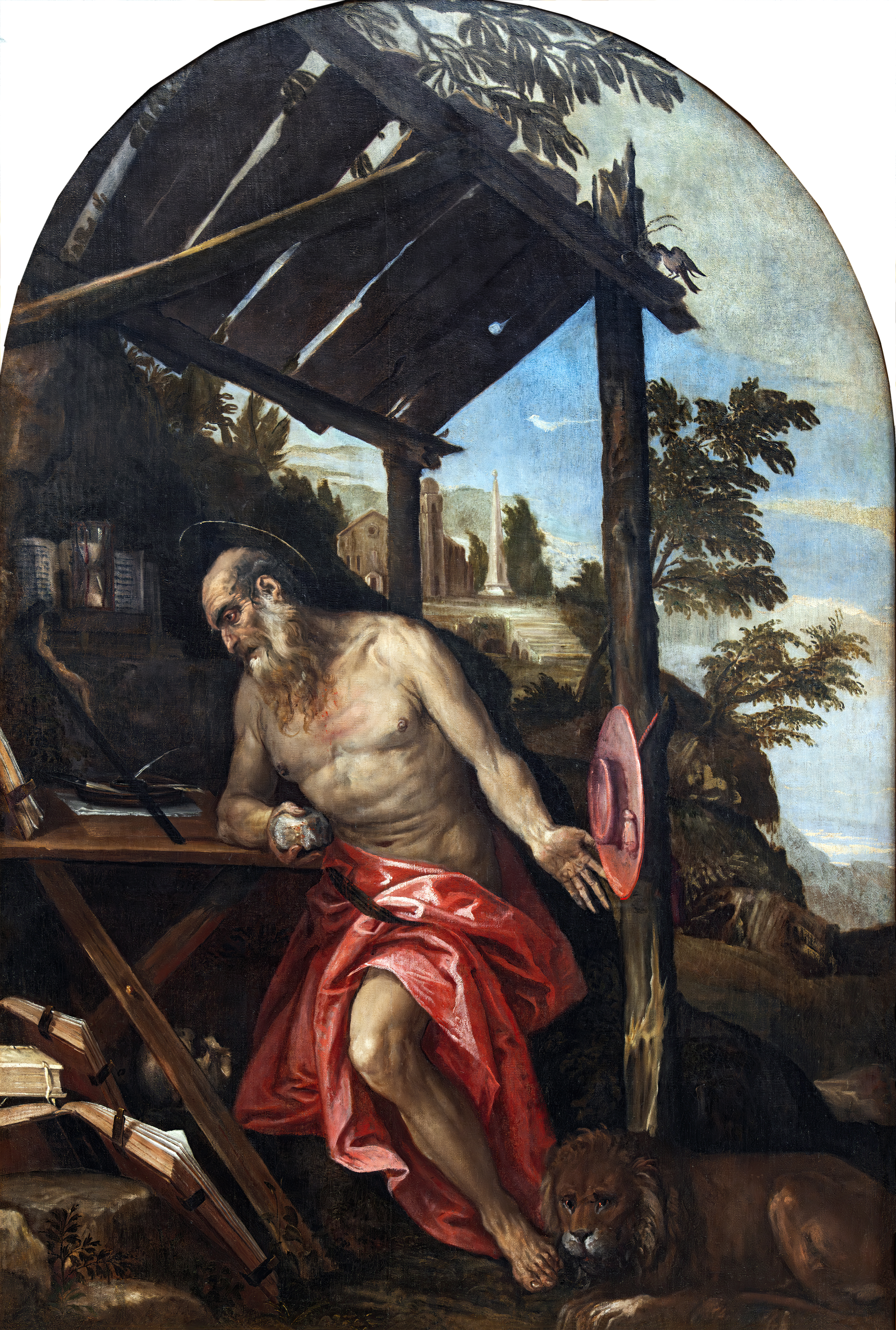
Saint Jerome in the Desert, c. 1584

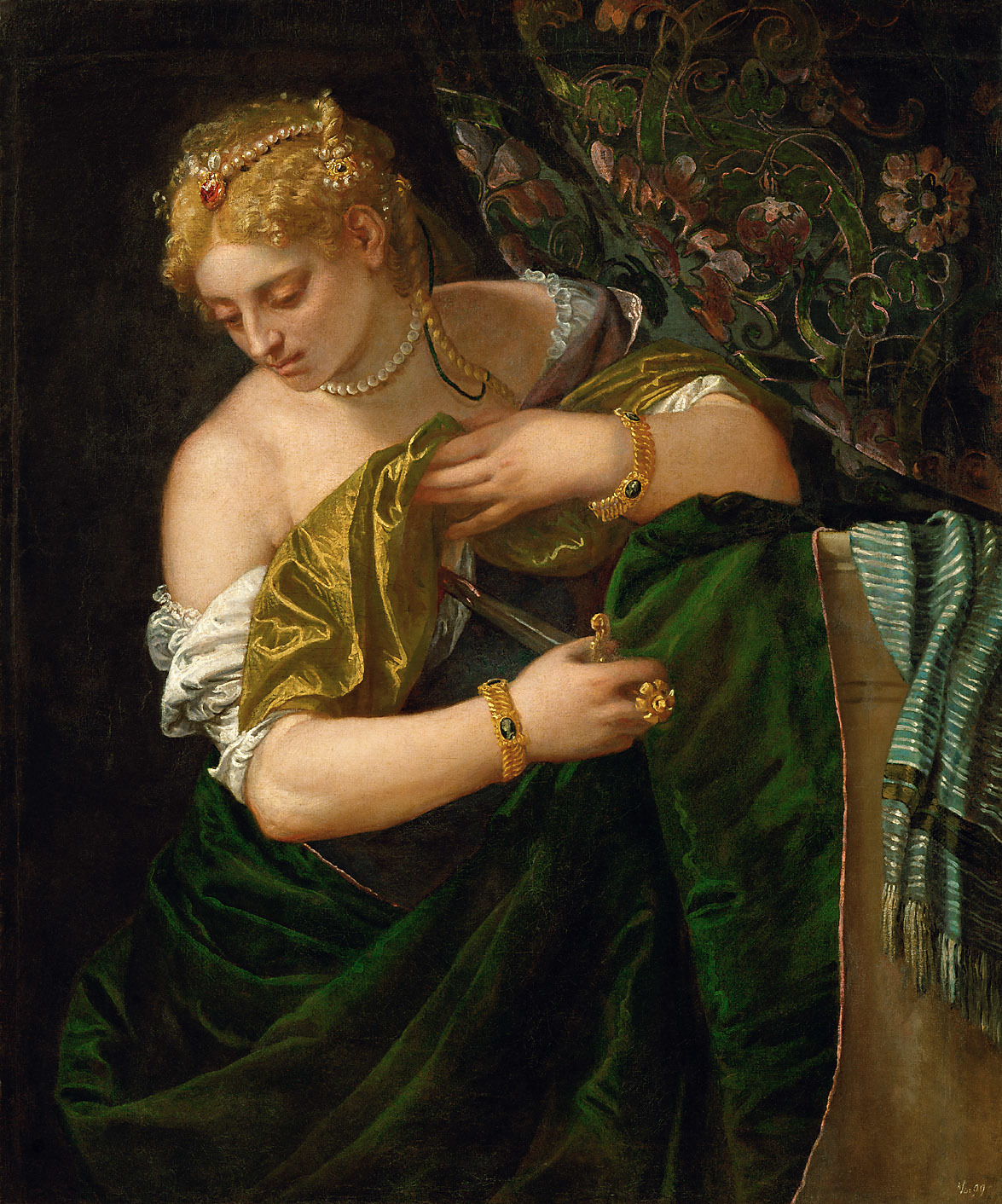
Lucretia, 1580s

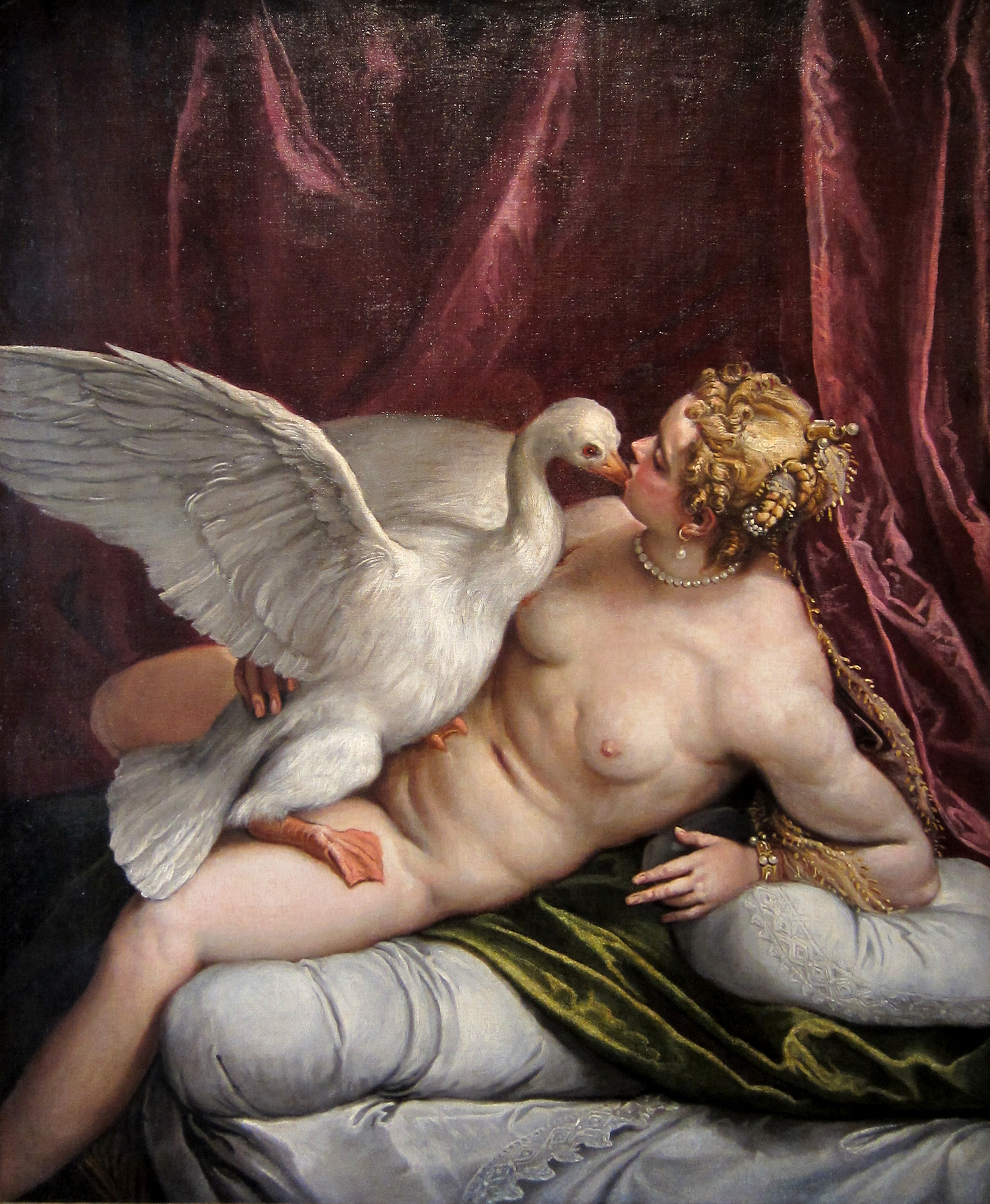
Leda and the Swan, c. 1585

== Working practices ==
In addition to the ceiling creations and wall paintings, Veronese also produced altarpieces (The Consecration of Saint Nicholas, 1561–62, London's National Gallery), paintings on mythological subjects (Venus and Mars, 1578, New York Metropolitan Museum of Art), and portraits (Portrait of a Lady, 1555, Louvre). A significant number of compositional sketches in pen, ink, and wash, figure studies in chalk, and chiaroscuro modelli and ricordi survive.

He headed a family workshop, including his younger brother Benedetto (1538–1598) as well as his sons Carlo and Gabriele, and his nephew Luigi Benfatto (also called dal Friso; 1559–1611), that remained active for a decade or so after his death in Venice in 1588, signing their work "Haeredes Pauli" ("Heirs of Paolo"), and continuing to use his drawings. According to Nicholas Penny, "The role of the workshop seems to have increased steadily, and after 1580 it is rare that we can feel confident that Veronese's was the sole hand involved". Among his pupils were his contemporary Giovanni Battista Zelotti and later, Giovanni Antonio Fasolo, Sigismondo de Stefani, and Anselmo Canneri. The Caliari family continued and another Paolo Caliari published the first monograph on his ancestor in 1888.

Veronese was one of the first painters whose drawings were sought by collectors during his lifetime.

== Selected works ==
Title	Created	Medium	Size (cm)	Owner	City
Arachne or Dialectics	(1520)	Fresco	??	Palazzo Ducale	Venice, Italy
Leda and the Swan (subject)	??	Oil on canvas	??	Musée Fesch	Ajaccio, Corsica
The Conversion of Mary Magdalene	(1545–1548)	Oil on canvas	163.5 × 117	National Gallery	London
The Temptation of St Anthony	(1552–1553)	Oil on canvas	198 × 151	Musée des Beaux-Arts	Caen
Zeus ousting the Vices	(1553?)	Oil on canvas	650 × 330	Louvre	Paris
St. Mark Crowning the Virtue	(1554?)	Oil on canvas	330 × 317	Louvre	Paris
Coronation of the Virgin	(1555)	Oil on canvas	?	San Sebastiano	Venice
La Bella Nani (Portrait of a Woman)	(1555–1560?)	Oil on canvas	119 × 103	Louvre	Paris
Annunciation	(1555?)	Oil on canvas	193 × 291	Uffizi	Florence
Venus Disarming Cupid	(1555 c.)	Oil on canvas	62.52 x 54.49" (158.8 x 138.4 cm)	Worcester Art Museum	Worcester, Massachusetts
Jesus among the Doctors in the Temple	(1558)	Oil on canvas	236 × 430	Prado	Madrid
Assumption of the Virgin	(1558?)	Oil on canvas	340 × 455	San Giovanni e Paolo	Venice
Supper at Emmaus	1559–1560	Oil on canvas	241 × 415	Louvre	Paris
The Wedding at Cana	(1560?)	Oil on canvas	207 × 457	Gemäldegalerie Alte Meister	Dresden
Portrait of a Man	(1560?)	Oil on canvas	120 × 102	Museum of Fine Arts	Budapest
The Resurrection of Jesus Christ	(1560)	Oil on canvas	...	San Francesco della Vigna	Venice
Decoration of the Villa Barbaro: Bacchus Giving Wine to Men, Giustiniana Giustiniani with Her Nurse and other scenes	(1560–1561)	Fresco	??	Villa Barbaro, Maser	Maser, Treviso
Venus and Adonis	(1561+)	Oil on canvas	123 × 174	Staatliche Kunstsammlungen	Augsburg
Virgin in Glory with Saints	(1562?)	Oil on canvas	??	San Sebastiano	Venice
St John the Baptist Preaching	(1562?)	Oil on canvas	??	Galleria Borghese	Rome
Madonna Enthroned with Saints	(1562?)	Oil on canvas	339 × 191	Gallerie dell'Accademia	Venice
The Wedding at Cana	(1563)	Oil on canvas	677 × 994	Louvre	Paris
Petrobelli altarpiece	(c. 1563)	Oil on canvas	Now divided	Dulwich Picture Gallery, National Gallery of Scotland, National Gallery of Canada, Blanton Museum of Art	Ottawa, Dulwich, Edinburgh & Austin, Texas
Holy Family and Saints (San Zaccaria Altarpiece; 1564)	1564	Oil on canvas	328 × 188	Gallerie dell'Accademia	Venice
Martyrdom of St. George	(1564)	Oil on canvas	426 × 305	San Giorgio in Braida	Verona
Sts. Mark and Marcellian Being Led to Martyrdom	(1565)	Oil on canvas	??	San Sebastiano	Venice
Martyrdom of St. Sebastian	(1565)	Oil on canvas	??	San Sebastiano	Venice
Allegory of Wisdom and Strength	(1565)	Oil on canvas	214.6 × 167	Frick Collection	New York
Allegory of Virtue and Vice	(1565)	Oil on canvas	219.1 x 169.5	Frick Collection	New York
The Family of Darius before Alexander	(1565–1570)	Oil on canvas	236.2 × 475.9	National Gallery	London
Madonna and Child with St. Elizabeth, the Infant St. John the Baptist, and St. Justina	(1565–1570)	Oil on canvas	40-7/8 x 62-1/4 in.	Timken Museum of Art	San Diego
Portrait of Daniele Barbaro	(1565–1567)	Oil on canvas	121 × 105.5	Rijksmuseum	Amsterdam
The Allegory of Love four scenes	(1570)	Oil on canvas	191 × 191	National Gallery	London
The Resurrection of Christ	(1570?)	Oil on canvas	136 × 104	Gemäldegalerie Alte Meister	Dresden
Die Madonna mit der Familie Cuccina	(1570?)	Oil on canvas	167 × 416	Gemäldegalerie Alte Meister	Dresden
The Finding of Moses	(1570?–1575?)	Oil on canvas	??	Kunsthistorisches Museum	Vienna
Bathsheba Bathing	(1575?)	Oil on canvas	191 × 224	Museum of Fine Arts of Lyon	Lyon
Portrait of a Sculptor	(1550?–1585?)	Oil on canvas	110.5 × 89	Metropolitan Museum of Art	New York
Battle of Lepanto	(1572?)	Oil on canvas	169 × 137	Gallerie dell'Accademia	Venice
The Supper of St Gregory the Great	(1572)	Oil on canvas	??	Monte Berico, Vicenza	Vicenza
The Feast in the House of Levi	(1573)	Oil on canvas	555 × 1,280	Gallerie dell'Accademia	Venice
Adoration of the Magi	(1573)	Oil on canvas	356 × 320	National Gallery	London
The Martyrdom of St. Justine	(1573?)	Oil on canvas	103 × 113	Uffizi	Florence
Ceres Renders Homage to Venice	(1575)	Oil on canvas	309 × 328	Gallerie dell'Accademia	Venice
Mystical Marriage of St Catherine	(1575?)	Oil on canvas	337 × 241	Gallerie dell'Accademia	Venice
Venus, Mars and Love with a Horse	(1575?)	Oil on canvas	47 × 47	Galleria Sabauda	Turin
Pietà	(1576–1582)	Oil on canvas	147 × 115	The Hermitage	St. Petersburg
The Resurrection of Christ	(1578?)	Oil on canvas	273 × 156	The Chapel, Chelsea and Westminster Hospital	London
Mars and Venus United by Love	(1578?)	Oil on canvas	205.7 × 161	Metropolitan Museum of Art	New York
Hermes, Herse and Aglaulus	(1576?–1584?)	Oil on canvas	232.4 × 173	Fitzwilliam Museum	Cambridge, UK
The Rape of Europa	(1580)	Oil on canvas	240 × 303	Sala dell'Anticollegio, Doge's Palace	Venice
Venus and Adonis	(1580)	Oil on canvas	212 × 191	Prado	Madrid
Venus and Adonis	(1580?)	Oil on Canvas	224.5 x 168.275	Seattle Art Museum	Seattle
Christ and the Centurion	(1580?)	Oil on canvas	99.2 × 130.8	Toledo Museum of Art	Toledo, Ohio
Lucretia	(1580s)	Oil on canvas	109 × 90.5	Kunsthistorisches Museum	Vienna
Christ in the Garden Supported by an Angel	(1580?)	Oil on canvas	80 × 108	Pinacoteca di Brera	Milan
St. Anthony Preaching to the Fish	(1580?)	Oil on canvas	??	Galleria Borghese	Rome
The Vision of St. Helena	(1580?)	Oil on canvas	166 × 134	Pinacoteca Vaticana	Rome
Judith and Holofernes	(1580?)	Oil on canvas	195 × 176	Galleria di Palazzo Rosso	Genoa
The People of Myra Welcoming St. Nicholas	(1582?)	Oil on canvas	diameter: 198	Gallerie dell'Accademia	Venice
Apotheosis of Venice	(1585)	Oil on canvas	904 × 579	Doge's Palace	Venice
Siege of Scutari	(1585)	Oil on canvas	904 × 579	Doge's Palace	Venice
The Conversion of Saint Pantaleimon	(1587)	Oil on canvas	277 x 160	San Pantalon	Venice
Portrait of Agostino Barbarigo	??	Oil on canvas	60 × 48	Museum of Fine Arts	Budapest
Baptism and Temptation of Christ	??	Oil on canvas	245 × 450	Pinacoteca di Brera	Milan
Portrait of a Venetian Woman (La Bella Nani)	??	Oil on canvas	117.3 × 100.8	Alte Pinakothek	Munich
Susanna in the Bath	??	Oil on canvas	198 × 198	Louvre	Paris
Penitent St. Jerome	??	Oil on canvas	80 x 95	Pavia Civic Museums	Pavia
Noli me tangere	??	Oil on canvas	??	Museum of Grenoble	Grenoble
Christ Crowned with Thorns	c. 1585	Oil on canvas	75.5 x 57.3	Montreal Museum of Fine Arts	Montreal
Sitting dog	??	Oil on canvas	44 × 82	National Gallery	Oslo
Supper at Emmaus	1565–1570	Oil on canvas	66 × 79	Museum Boijmans Van Beuningen	Rotterdam
David with the Head of Goliath	(1575)	Oil on canvas	??	Lobkowicz Palace	Prague

== Veronese in popular culture ==
- The Monty Python sketch "The Last Supper" from Monty Python Live at the Hollywood Bowl is based on the story of Veronese's painting The Feast in the House of Levi.
- An imaginary Veronese painting called La Morte dil Cesare is prominently featured in a story arc of the award-winning comics series 100 Bullets.

== Veronese in religion ==
- Theosophical authors have identified Paolo Veronese with the Master of Wisdom or Mahatma known as "The Venetian," who is the Head of the Third Ray.
- Elizabeth Clare Prophet repeated this information in her "Ascended Masters" teachings.

== See also ==
- Holy Family with Saint Catherine and Saint John the Baptist
- List of Orientalist artists
- Orientalism
- Portrait of Iseppo da Porto and his son Adriano

== Bibliography ==
- Freedberg, Sydney Joseph. Painting in Italy, 1500–1600. Yale University Press, 1993, pp. 550-560.
- Ilchman, Frederick, et al., Titian, Veronese, Tintoretto: Rivals in Renaissance Venice, MFA Publications, Museum of Fine Arts, Boston, 2009, ISBN 978-0878467396
- Laqueur, Thomas W., "Veronese's Dogs". The Public Domain Review, September 16, 2026.
- Penny, Nicholas, National Gallery Catalogues (new series): The Sixteenth Century Italian Paintings, Volume II, Venice 1540–1600, 2008, National Gallery Publications Ltd, ISBN 1857099133
- Rearick, W. R., The Art of Paolo Veronese 1528–1588, National Gallery of Art, 1988
- Rosand, David, Painting in Sixteenth-Century Venice: Titian, Veronese, Tintoretto, 2nd ed. 1997, Cambridge University Press, ISBN 0521565685
- Salomon, Xavier F., Veronese, National Gallery London, 2014, ISBN 978-1857095531
- Salomon, Xavier F., Paolo Veronese: The Petrobelli Altarpiece. Silvana, 2009.
- Watson, Peter, Wisdom and Strength: The Biography of a Renaissance Masterpiece, Hutchinson, 1990, ISBN 009174637X
