= Schaezlerpalais =

Building in Augsburg, Germany

Coordinates: 48°21′54″N 10°53′57″E

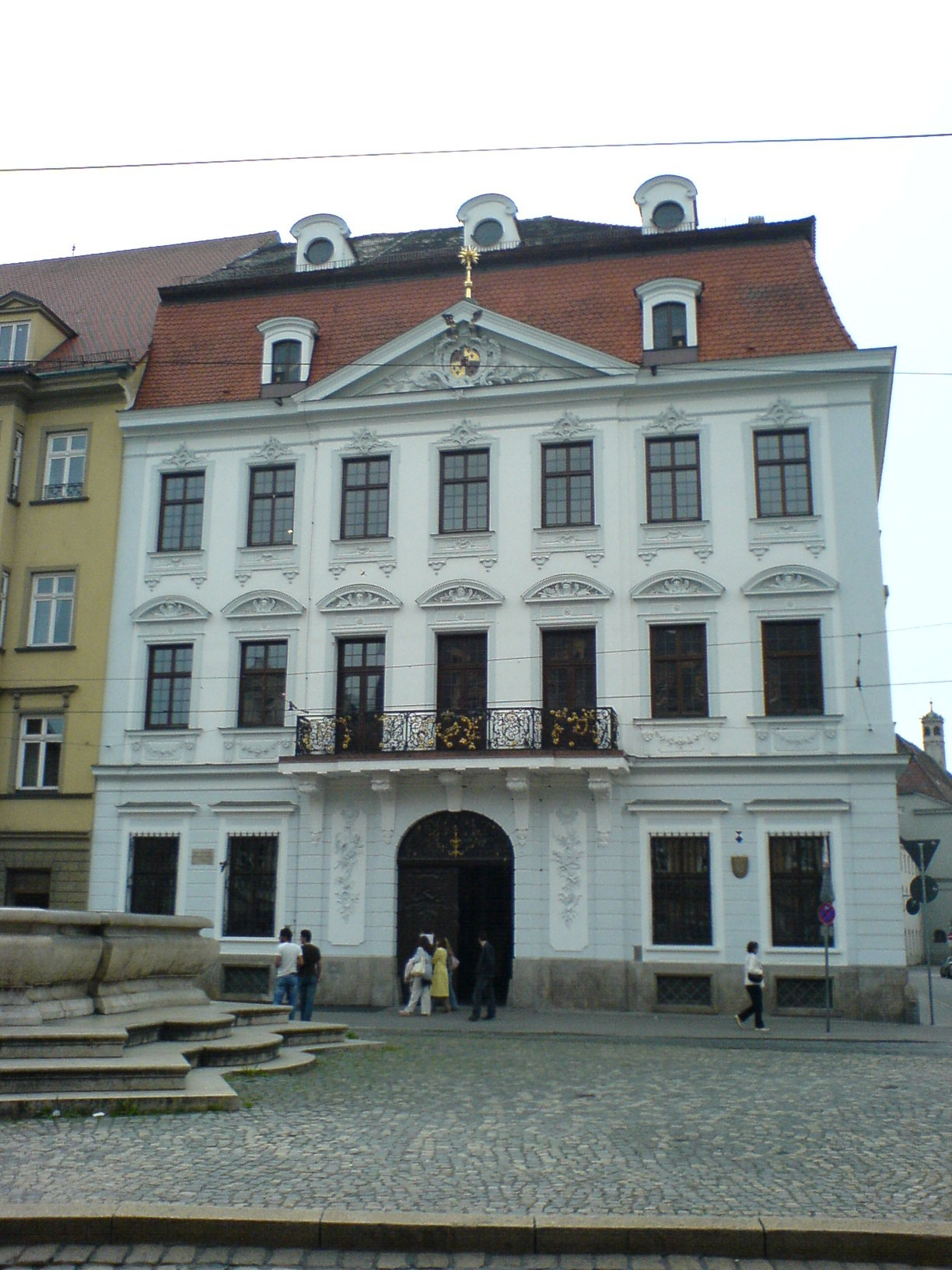
Front facade of the Schaezlerpalais Schaezlerpalais ballroom

The Schaezlerpalais is a baroque palace in Augsburg. The palace extends far back from the street, encompassing dozens of rooms, courtyards, and gardens. The gilded mirrored ballroom was built between 1765-1770 and has survived intact. It is widely regarded as the most artistically significant Rococo ballroom in Germany. Carl Albert von Lespilliez was the architect of the Schaezlerpalais.

The Free State of Bavaria has declared the Schaezlerpalais a registered historic monument.

The Schaezlerpalais houses the following art collections:

- Deutsche Barockgalerie, Southern German paintings of the 17th and 18th century (1st floor)
- Karl und Magdalene Haberstock-Stiftung Baroque paintings, e.g. Paolo Veronese, Canaletto, Anthony van Dyck and Giovanni Battista Tiepolo (2nd floor)
- Staatsgalerie Altdeutsche Meister with paintings from Southern Germany of the 15th and 16th century (in a former monastery ["Katharinenkloster"]), a subsidiary of Bavarian State Picture Collection (Bayerische Staatsgemäldesammlungen)

Adjacent to the building complex, a Baroque garden is open to the public.

== Sources ==
- "Schaezlerpalais". Kunstsammlungen und Museen Augsburg (in German).

Media related to Schaezlerpalais at Wikimedia Commons
