= Petrobelli Altarpiece =

Painting by Paolo Veronese

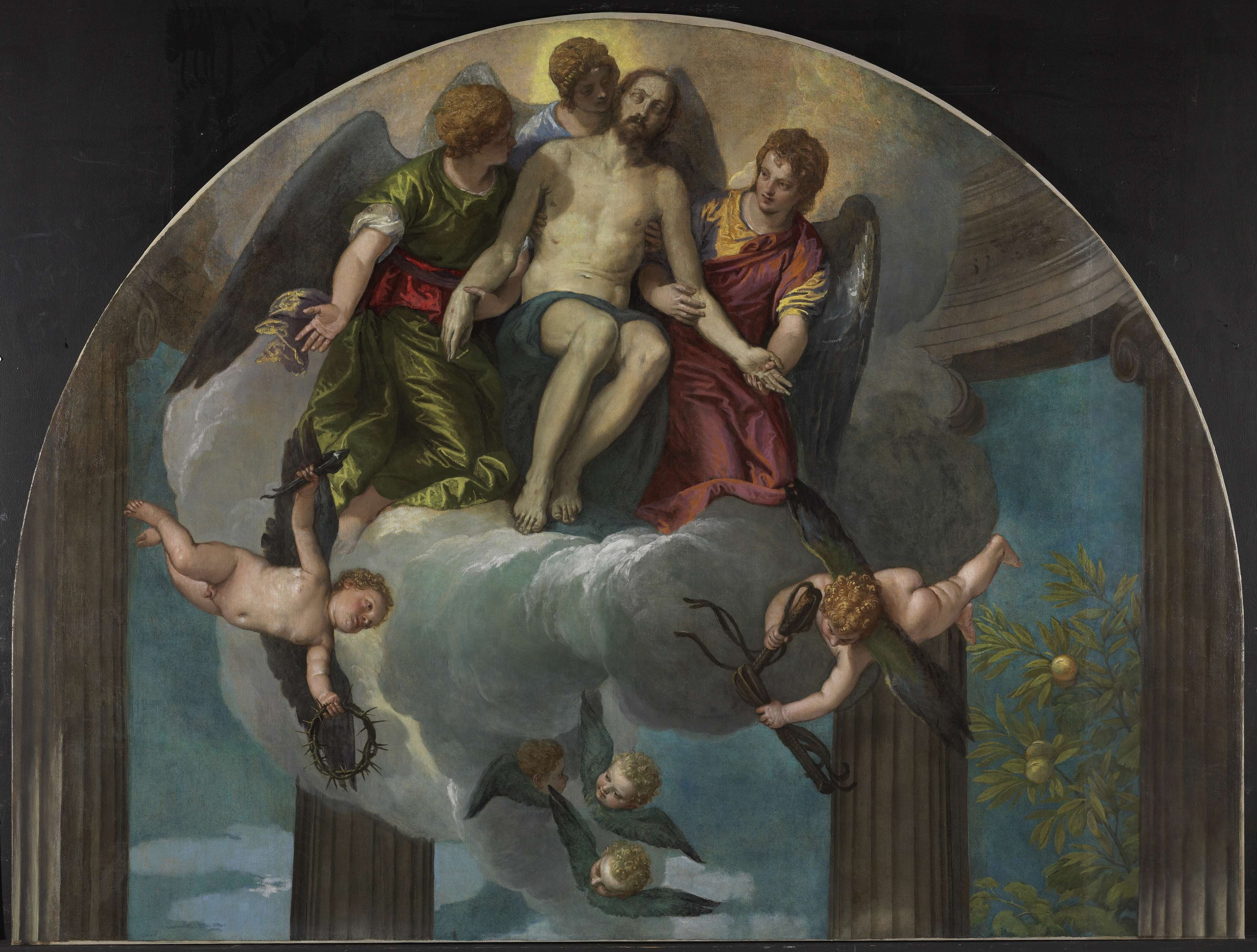
The top fragment, National Gallery of Canada

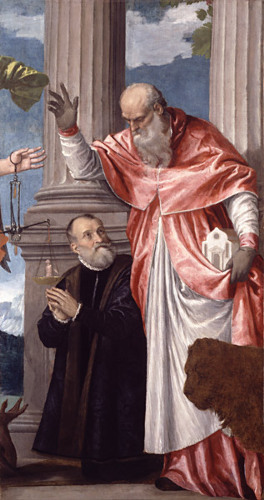
Saint Jerome and his attribute of a lion, with Girolamo Petrobelli, Dulwich.

The Petrobelli Altarpiece is an oil painting on canvas of c. 1563 by Paolo Veronese, the remaining fragments of which are now divided between four museums.

== History ==
The picture is generally assumed to be the altarpiece commissioned by the cousins Girolamo (d. 1569) and Antonio (d. 1587) Petrobelli for the church of San Francis in the small town of Lendinara, near Venice. It is also agreed to be by the leading Venetian painter Paolo Veronese, who had strong ties to the region, although the commission is not documented, nor was the work engraved nor mentioned by contemporary works on art. The date is either 1563, which was mentioned in an inscription on a frieze with the names of the Petrobellis in the church, or if this is ignored and the work is judged only on stylistic grounds, considerably later in the view of most art historians. The cousins had inherited their uncle's large estate and had no legitimate heirs; in the end Petrobello Petrobelli, illegitimate son of Girolamo, inherited the estates of both men. Presumably the cousins hoped that the spectacular work would seal their status as one of the leading families in the town.

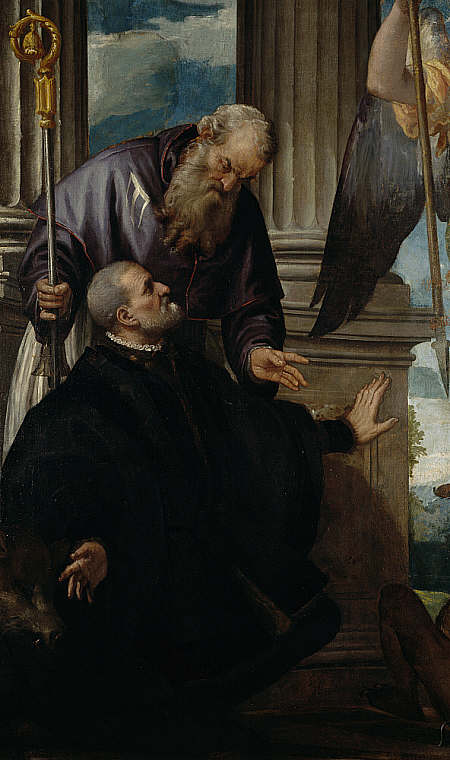
Saint Anthony Abbot and Antonio Petrobelli, National Gallery of Scotland

Set above the altar in their burial chapel, Veronese's painting shows donor portraits of the two men protected and presented to Christ by their name saints. The cousins are privileged to witness a miraculous apparition, a foretaste of the future: the archangel Saint Michael, who will weigh the souls of the dead at the Last Judgment. Above, we see the dead Christ, who died to redeem mankind. Veronese offered his patrons a compellingly realistic depiction of a visionary scene, and captured the hope of the faithful Christian for salvation. The angels carry three of the Instruments of the Passion.

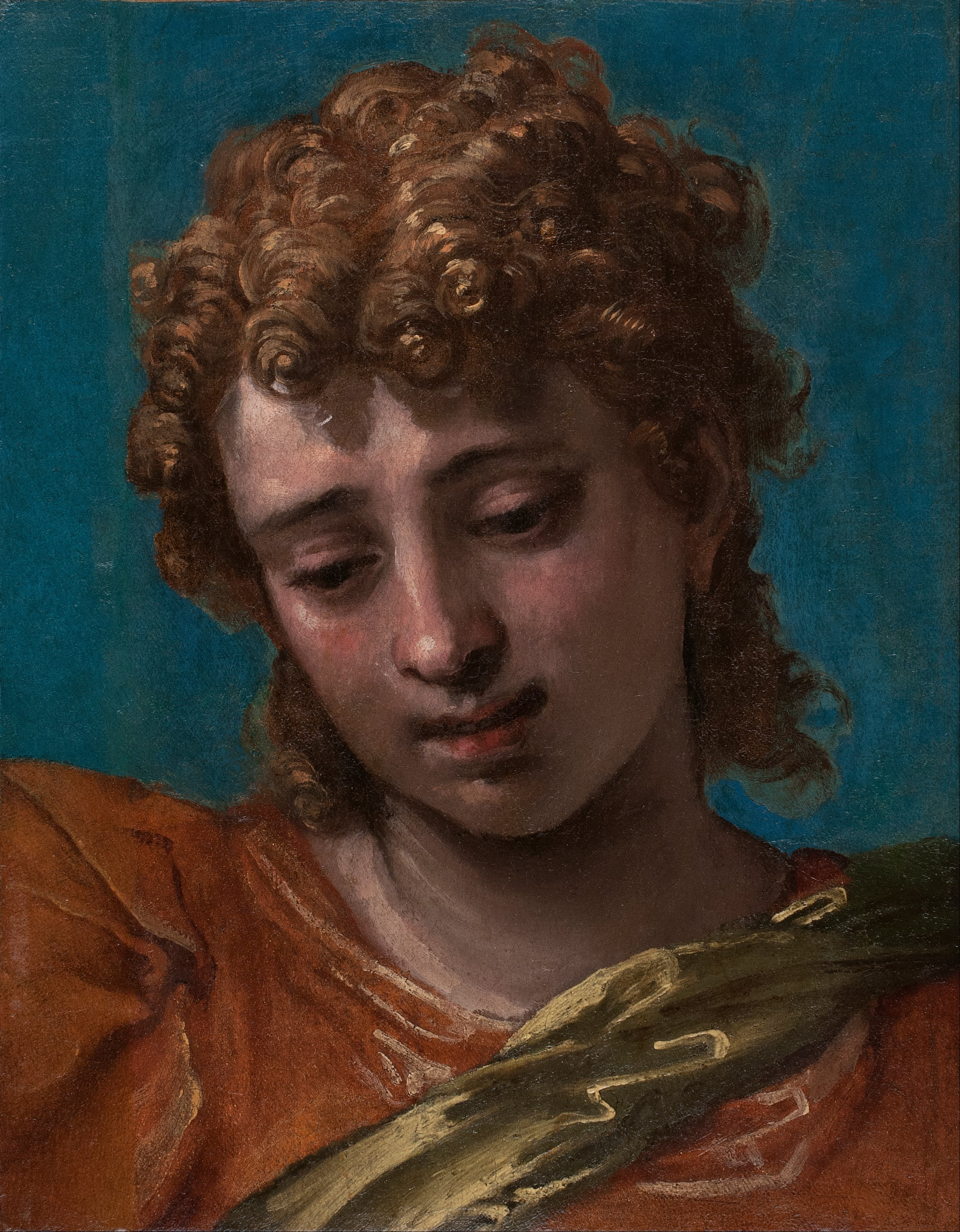
Head of the Archangel Michael, Blanton Museum of Art

In the 1770s the church was disestablished after the suppression of its order by the Venetian government. In 1785 the church was finally demolished, and by 1789 the altarpiece was with a Venetian art dealer. It was at this stage it was divided, and in 1795 the Dulwich fragment was sold by the London art dealer Noël Desenfans to his friend Sir Francis Bourgeois, who bequeathed it to Dulwich in 1811. The fragments all eventually came to rest in public collections in England (Dulwich Picture Gallery, London), Scotland (National Gallery of Scotland, Edinburgh), Canada (National Gallery of Canada, Ottawa), and the United States (Blanton Museum of Art, Austin, Texas).

== Re-emergence of the Archangel Michael ==
Close examination of the fragments, years of study, and careful restoration were needed to reconstruct the altarpiece's original form. As reconstructed, the position of the two donor and patron fragments at each side of the painting can be seen by the columns, which match up to those in the top fragment. However the left hand Edinburgh fragment has been slightly trimmed at the bottom and left side, and only the Dulwich fragment on the right contains part of the original bottom and right hand edges. The wing, spear and arm of Michael can be seen at the top right corner of the left-hand fragment in Edinburgh, just as his hand holding scales, and the tip of his mantle floating off his shoulder, appear at the left of the Dulwich piece. These elements were overpainted in both these fragments until restorations in recent decades, and a series of proposed reconstructions in 1932-33 had an empty centre, which it was suggested might have been occupied by a Madonna, a crucifix (real or painted), or a real reliquary, although a Saint Michael was recognised as a possibility, and the 1914 Edinburgh Catalogue claimed, completely wrongly, that the missing figure was at Castle Howard.

Parts of Michael were first identified at Dulwich around 1950; the Edinburgh parts were revealed in 1958, the attribute of the scales making it clear that it was a figure of Michael that had occupied the centre of the painting. The Blanton fragment was only identified as part of the work in 2008, by a Dulwich curator. Michael's body is missing, and the dragon or serpent he was standing on and piercing with his spear. Other than that the figures of the original work appear to be complete. The missing areas are a strip across the whole width of the painting under the top portion in Ottawa, as well as the right side of the Ottawa fragment, and a strip down the centre of the lower half of the work, except for the Blanton head. It is rather odd that Michael's body was entirely disposed of; it may have been damaged.

In 2009, an exhibition at the Dulwich Gallery temporarily reunited the fragments for the first time in over two hundred years. The restored picture travelled to Canada and the US later the same year.
