= Holy Family with Saint Catherine and Saint John the Baptist =

Painting by Paolo Veronese

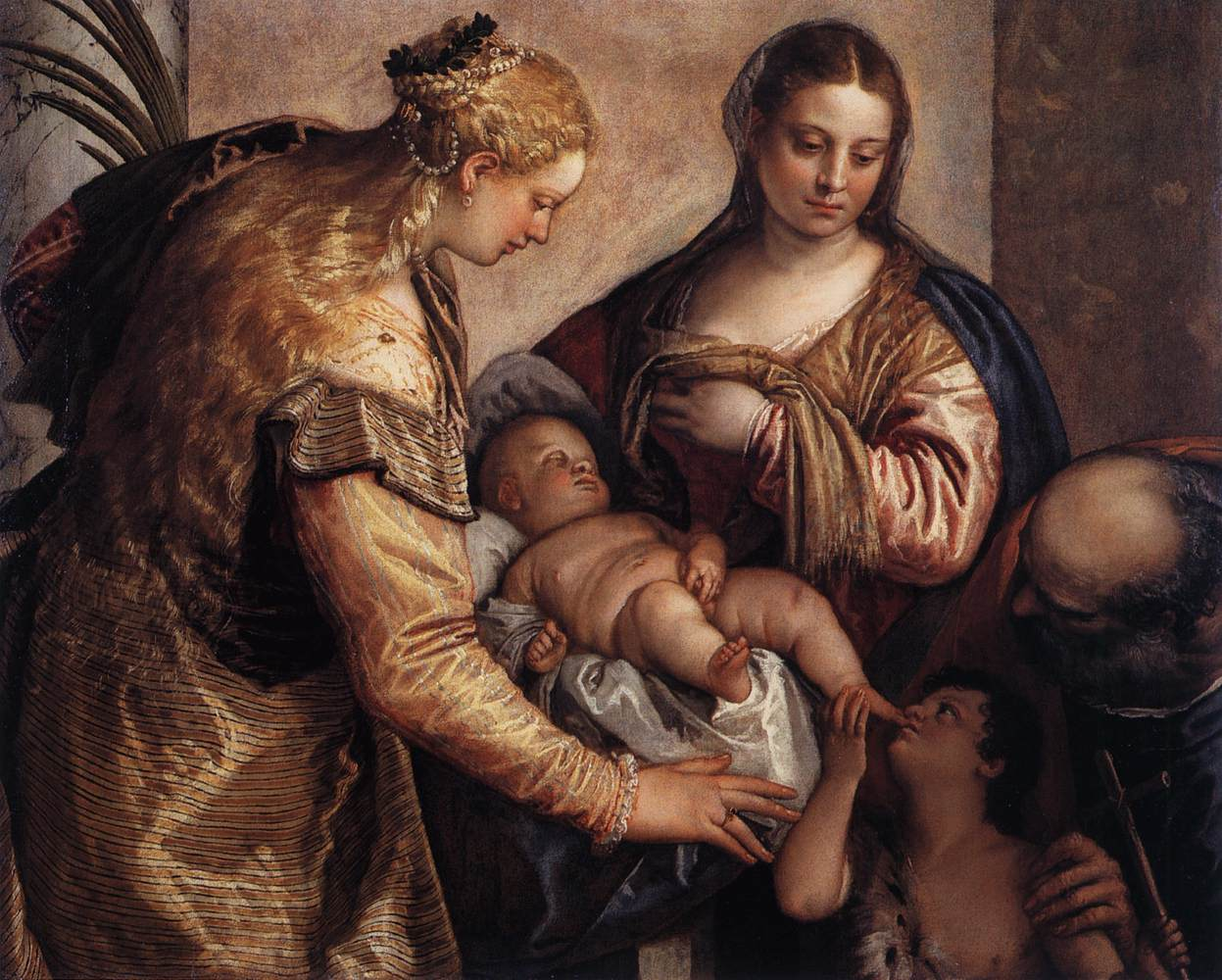
- Artist: Paolo Veronese
- Year: c. 1562-1565
- Medium: Oil on canvas
- Dimensions: 86 cm × 122 cm (34 in × 48 in)
- Location: Uffizi; Florence

Holy Family with Saint Catherine and Saint John the Baptist is an oil-on-canvas painting by Paolo Veronese, now in the Uffizi, in Florence. Its dating is debated, varying between his early period and his late one, the latter influenced by Tintoretto, with the latter the majority view, placing it in c.1562–1565. Some early copies survive, one on parchment by Carlo Loth (Uffizi inv. 1890–813), one by Gian Antonio Guardi (Seattle Art Museum) and a third of almost exactly the same dimensions as the original (Baltimore Museum of Art), possibly autograph.

No records survive of who commissioned the painting, though Martinelli theorises that it may have been the Barbaro family, whose patron saint was Catherine of Alexandria and which had previously commissioned other works from the artist. It was recorded as being in Venice in 1648 in the residence of the Windmann family from Carinthia near the church of San Canciano. In 1654 Paolo del Sera, cardinal Carlo de' Medici's agent in Venice, sold it to the cardinal. On the cardinal's death and at Del Sera's own suggestion, his relation cardinal Leopoldo acquired it from himself. It finally passed from him to its present home in 1798.

== Description and style ==
Against a neutral background, interrupted only by the edge of a wall, Mary, on the right, offers her sleeping son to the homage of a saint in the foreground, dressed like a princess and holding the palm of martyrdom, and of Saint John, who kisses the child's foot while St. Joseph bends over him with a paternal gesture, placing a hand on his shoulder.

The identity of the female saint, with few iconographic attributes, has been debated. Ancient sources speak of Catherine of Alexandria, the martyred princess in Egypt. Supporting this is the gesture with which the saint holds out her hand with the ring on her finger, as if the mystical marriage typical of the iconography of Saint Catherine had just taken place. Later studies have instead suggested that Saint Barbara is depicted.

The painting is noted for the refinement of the poses, inclined along the diagonal, the material sense in the rendering of the fabrics, the highlights in the blond hair of the saint, the refinement of her hairstyle, and the effects of light and shadow. Conservation treatment in preparation for the 1988 exhibition The Art of Paolo Veronese, 1528-1588 removed an old yellowed repaint.
