= The Feast in the House of Levi =

1573 painting by Paolo Veronese

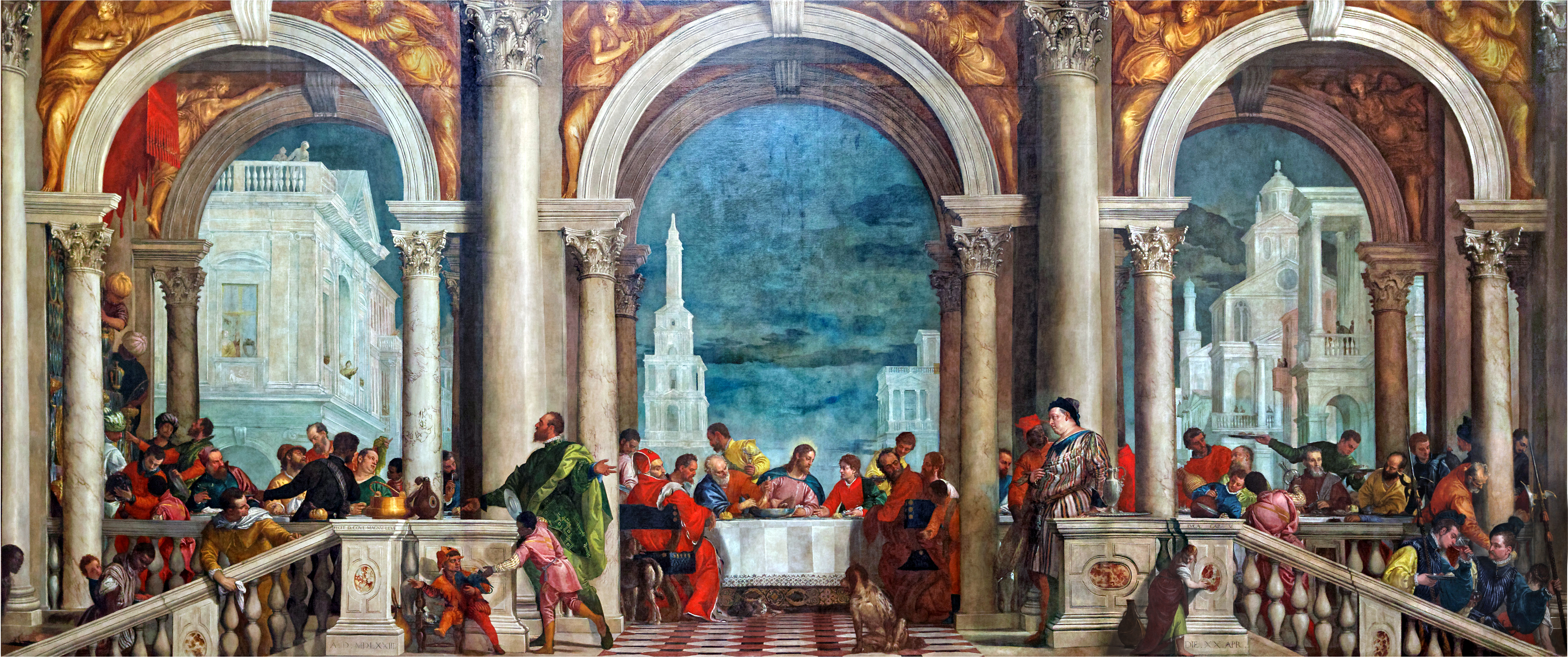
- Artist: Paolo Veronese
- Year: 1573
- Medium: Oil on canvas
- Movement: Renaissance
- Dimensions: 555 cm × 1309 cm (219 in × 515 in)
- Location: Gallerie dell'Accademia, Venice

The Feast in the House of Levi or Christ in the House of Levi is a 1573 oil painting by Italian painter Paolo Veronese and one of the largest canvases of the 16th century, measuring 555 cm × 1,309 cm (18.21 ft × 42.95 ft). It is now in the Gallerie dell'Accademia, in Venice. It was painted by Veronese for a wall of a Dominican friary called the refectory of the Basilica di Santi Giovanni e Paolo.

This painting was intended to be a Last Supper, to replace an earlier work by Titian of this subject destroyed by fire in 1571. The painting is directly tied to Luke, chapter 5, of the Bible which is clear from the inscription the artist added. The painting shows a banquet taking place in which Christ is the focal point at the center of the image. However, the painting led to an investigation by the Tribunal of the Venetian Holy Inquisition. Veronese was called to answer for irreverence and indecorum, and the serious offense of heresy was mentioned.

== Subject ==
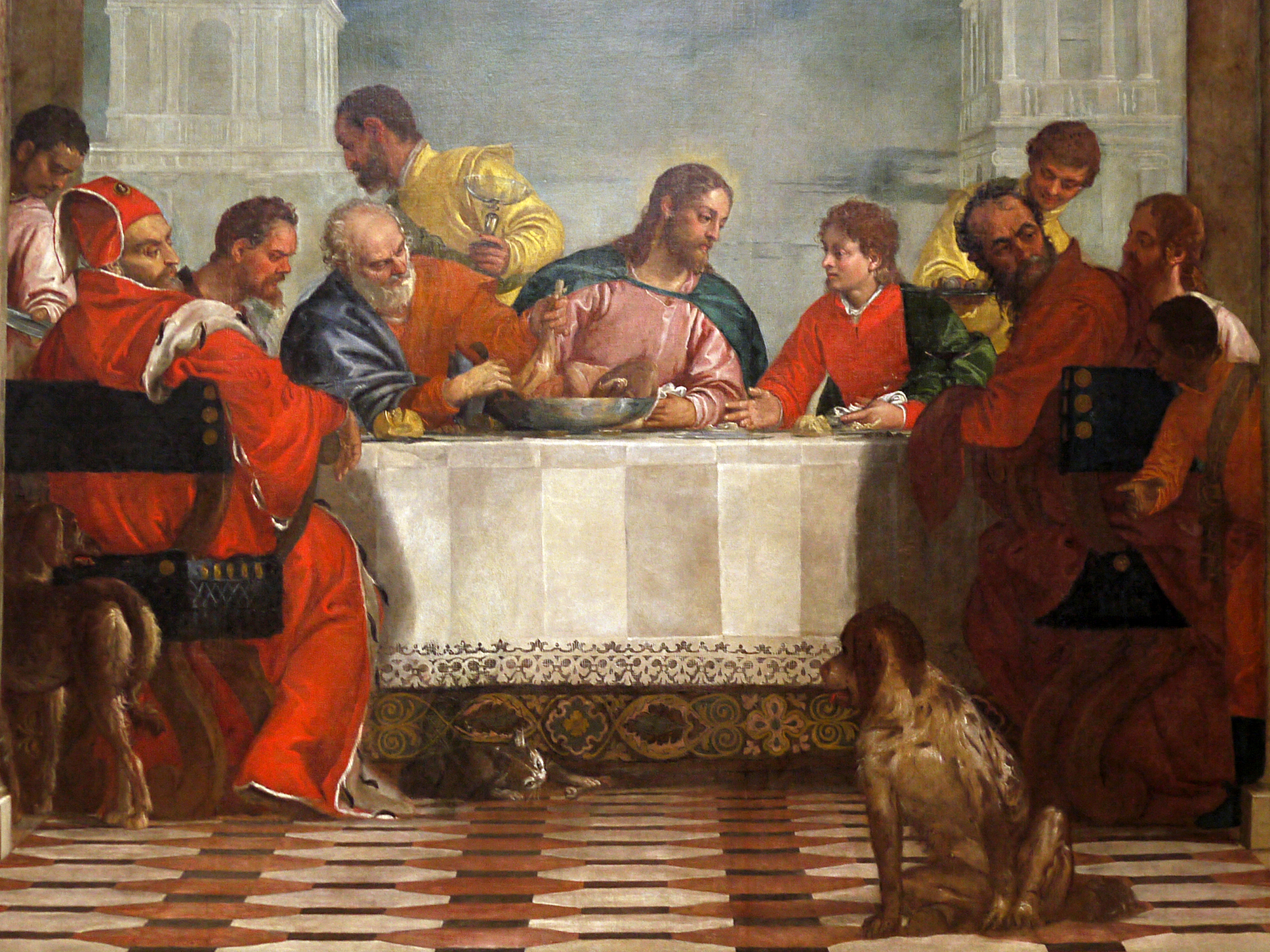
Saints Peter and John flank Christ, with Judas the uneasy figure in red

Originally this painting was meant to be of the Last Supper as a replacement for the painting by Titian of the same subject that perished in a fire. However, the subject was changed by Veronese after his trial before the Inquisition. The revised title refers to an episode in the Gospel according to St. Luke, chapter 5, in which Jesus is invited to a banquet:

"And Levi made him a great feast in his own house: and there was a great company of publicans and of others that sat down with them. But their scribes and Pharisees murmured against his disciples, saying, 'Why do ye eat and drink with publicans and sinners?' And Jesus answering said unto them, 'They that are whole need not a physician; but they that are sick. I came not to call the righteous, but sinners to repentance.'" (Luke 5: 29-32).

The event taking place in this painting is when Christ announces that one of his disciples will betray him, which is suggested by the surrounding chaos. The painting is packed with figures and ornate Roman architecture, including a man with a nosebleed, multiple slaves, and drunken Germans. These figures were seen as inappropriate to include in a religious work of art. According to the Church, religious events should be portrayed as close to how they occurred as possible, without additions by the artist.

== Description ==
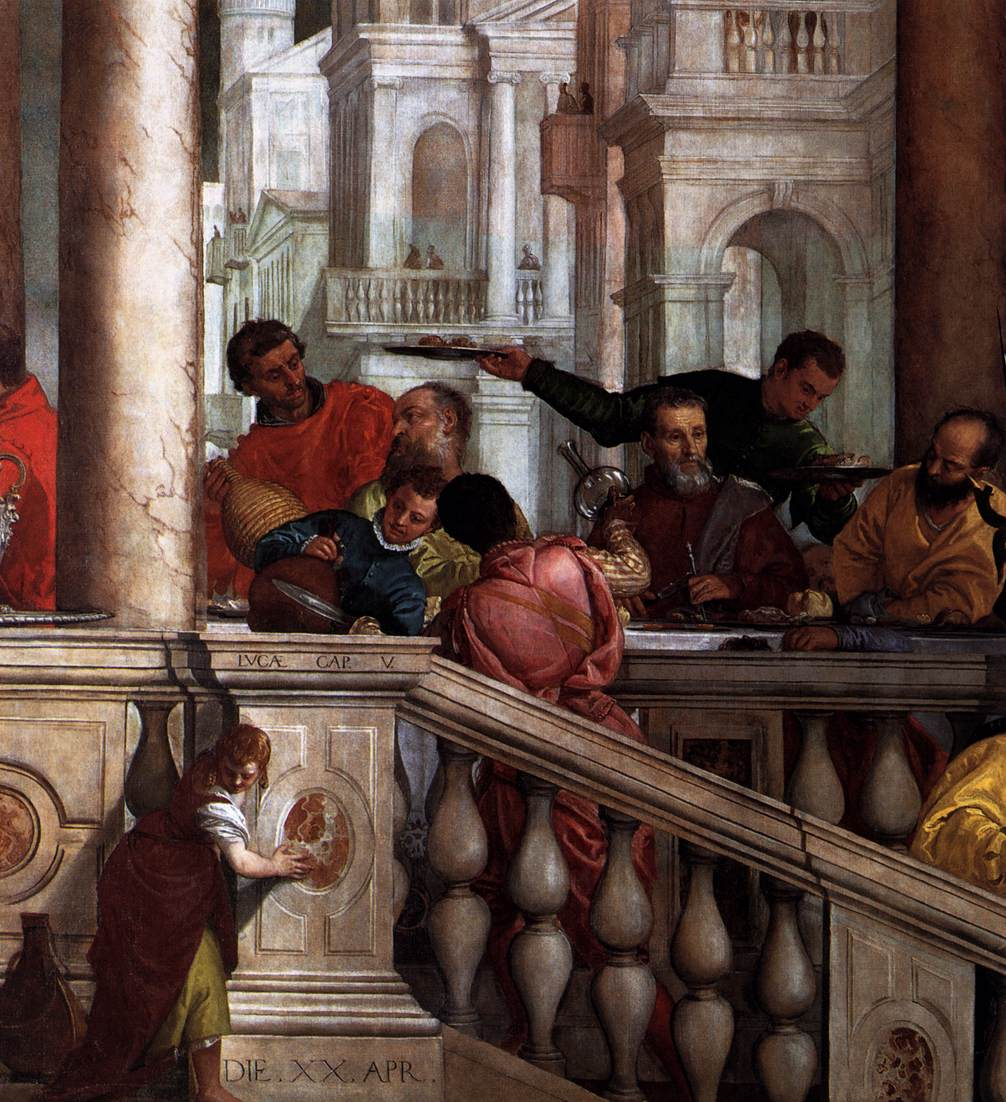
Detail of child

The painting depicts a banquet scene in which the figure of Christ is depicted in the center. The surrounding people interact in a turbulence of polychromatic splendor in a diverse range of positions and poses. The feast is framed by great pillars and archways that are reminiscent of a triptych in organization. The archways also call to mind triumphal arches, which, in this context, are a metaphor for Christ's triumph in regards to death since he will be resurrected. Triumphal arches were common in ancient Rome and were positioned in highly visible areas, where triumphal parades took place to bring attention to the events or people for which they were dedicated.

The center of the image is reinforced as the focal point by the two sets of stairs on either side of the composition. The stairways encourage viewer's eye to travel towards the figure of Christ. The architectural structures in this painting are similar to Northern Italian Roman-inspired churches. These churches were known for stairs that led up to them, which is mirrored in this painting. The absence of buildings behind Christ makes the space appear heavenly. In this composition, Veronese did not use linear perspective but, rather, chose to have diagonals converging at different points instead of at a single vanishing point. It is likely that Veronese went against linear perspective due to concerns about the large surface the painting was to take up, as well as the many different angles from which viewers would be seeing this artwork. The spatial arrangement of the artwork appears to have been of paramount importance to the artist since, in his testimony, he mentioned that the figures who offended the Holy Tribunal were specifically added on a different level than Christ and his apostles were.

== Historical context ==
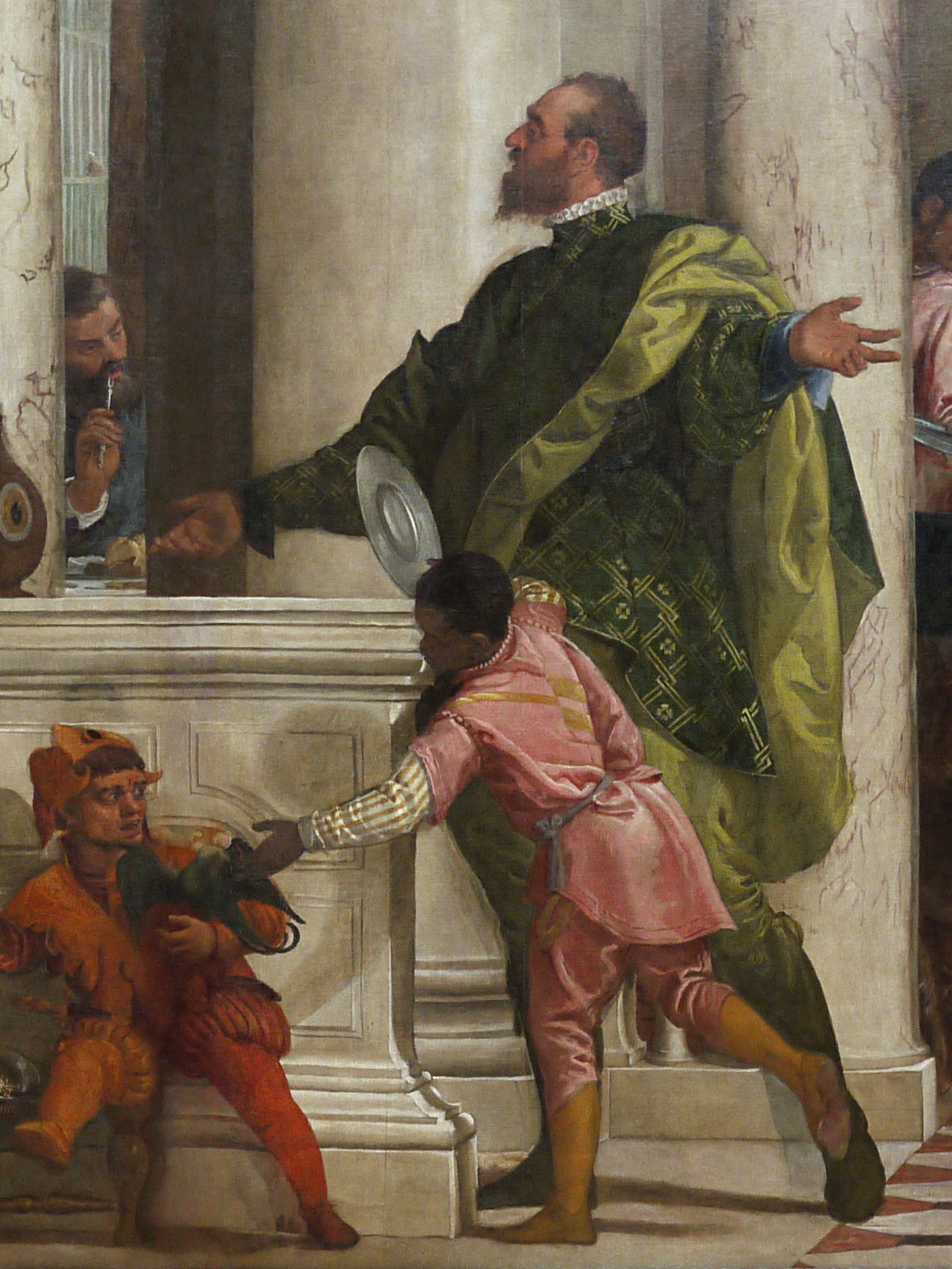
Detail of Jester with a parrot on his arm and an Apostle picking his teeth with a fork

In the year of 1573, roughly three months after Veronese had finished this piece, the Venetian Holy Inquisition summoned the artist on the account of his painting to answer questions about elements deemed inappropriate for a depiction of the Last Supper. The Holy Tribunal of Venice was made up of six members. The leader of the Tribunal, responsible for leading the interrogation of the artist, was called the inquisitor. The objectives of the Tribunal were to uphold a sense of equilibrium between Venice and Rome on religious, and political levels. There was harmony within the Holy Tribunal as a result of the Republic of Venice and the Vatican being united in their Christian ideals against anything that went against Catholic orthodoxy. Although in Venice the Holy Tribunal generally did not give harsh sentences, they did have the power to invoke death sentences. Since the Tribunal had such authority, an interrogation by them was seen as an event to take seriously.

One theory as to why Veronese was interrogated by the Tribunal is that the inquisitor wanted to show he was capable of this job. This was necessary because there had been a newly appointed nuncio who worked directly with the Pope in Rome. According to this theory, it could be assumed that the interrogation was a result of the events surrounding members of the Holy Tribunal itself. In other words, this interrogation was, perhaps, not truly about Veronese, this artwork, or its iconography in the first place.

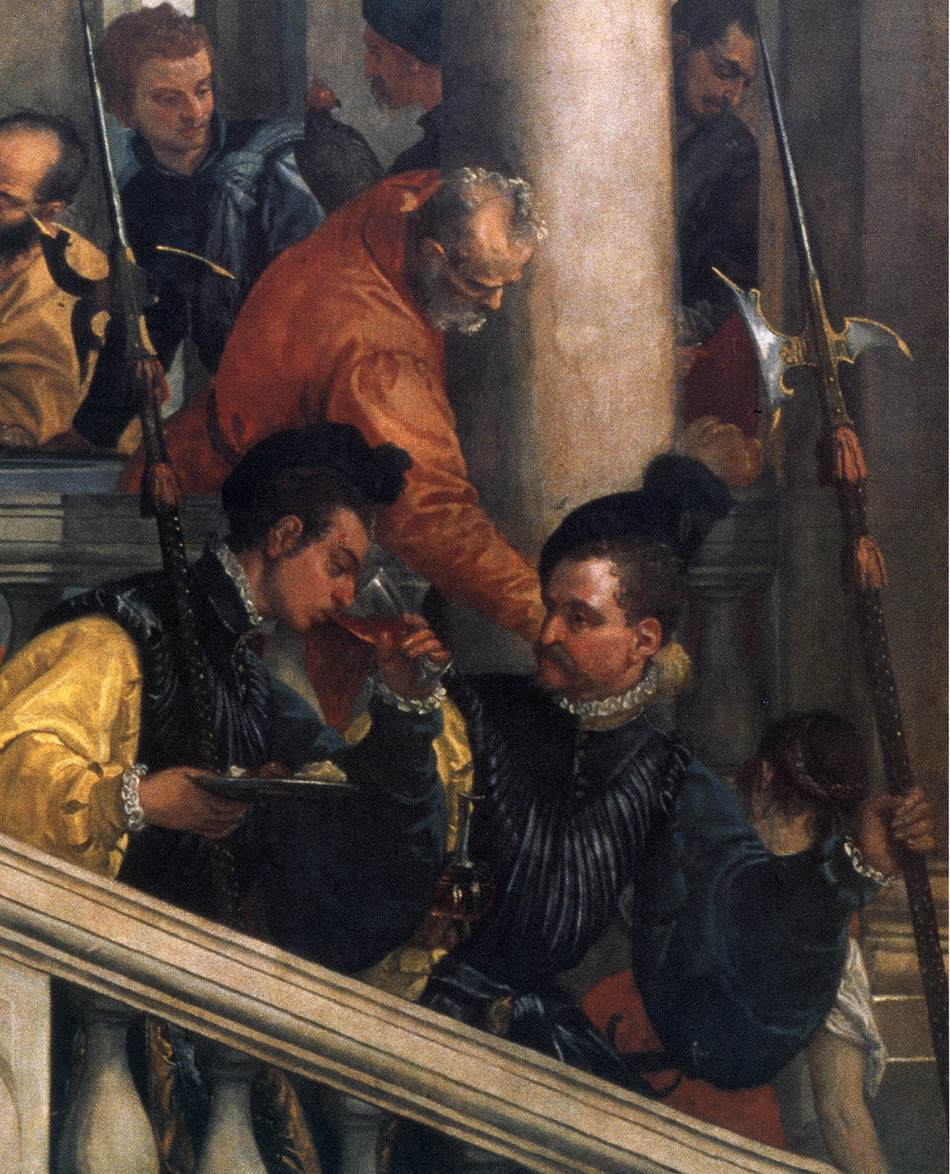
Detail of drunken German soldiers

In the Renaissance, it was uncommon for patrons to give any specifications in regards to how a story or scene was portrayed by the artist. There is evidence that compositions were often left solely up to the artist, as was stated in a painting treatise written in 1435 by Leon Battista Alberti. This led to a situation where the artist alone would be judged for their choices. Given that it was common practice for the artist to create their own composition with only a subject matter to guide them from the patron, the Holy Tribunal, unsurprisingly, put the artist Veronese on trial, and not the patron. During the interrogation, Veronese was asked to explain why the painting contained "buffoons, drunken Germans, dwarfs and other such scurrilities" as well as extravagant costumes and settings, in what is indeed a fantasy version of a Venetian patrician feast.

Veronese defended his painting by claiming that this painting had a large amount of space for him to fill; thus, on a practical level, he had to fill in any superfluous space left over which is why he included these figures. The artist also stated that he felt the placement of these figures was a good distance away from Christ, keeping them from tainting the image of the Last Supper.

By painting The Feast in the House of Levi in this manner, Veronese had gone against the Council of Trent, which had been created as part of the Counter-Reformation. The decrees of the Council of Trent included (at the very last minute) brief and vague rules for religious artworks, which were then codified and amplified by a number of clerical interpreters.

According to the transcript of the trial of Veronese for The Feast in the House of Levi, the artist clearly stated that he had filled the extra space with figures in order to create a full and complete composition. However, the manner in which this was accomplished was in violation of the Council of Trent's rules. The artist's reasoning did not move the Holy Tribunal. The Holy Tribunal made clear to Veronese that, in their opinion, he had opened Catholicism up to censure from Protestants and must fix his mistake. In the end, Veronese was told by the Holy Tribunal that he must change his painting within a three-month period. Instead, he simply changed the title to The Feast in the House of Levi, still an episode from the Gospels, but less doctrinally central, and one in which the Gospels specified "sinners" as present. Veronese decided to add an inscription to the painting as well, thereby removing the association to Simon and instead linking the artwork to Levi. After this, no more was said. The transcripts of the trial still exist and are accessible.

== Sources ==
- Archer, Madeline Cirillo, and Christina J. Moose (ed). Great Lives from History: Renaissance & Early Modern Era, 1454-1600 Paolo Veronese. Salem Online, 2005
- Gallerie Academia Venezia. "The Feast in The House of Levi." Last modified 2020. http://www.gallerieaccademia.it/en/feast-house-levi.
- Gisolfi, Diana. "Veronese [Caliari], Paolo." Grove Art Online (2003): 11. OneSearch.
- Grasman, Edward. "On Closer Inspection – The Interrogation of Paolo Veronese." Artibus et Historiae 30, no. 59 (2009): 125–132.
- Harris, Dr. Beth, and Dr. Steven Zucker. "Verones's Feast in the House of Levi." Smarthistory at Khan Academy.
- Hope, Charles. "Religious Narrative in Renaissance Art." Journal of the Royal Society of Arts 134, no. 5364 (1986): 807.
- Ignatjeva, O. A., Esipov, V. V., and Losj, O. K. "Triumphal Arch and Triumphal Procession as Antiquity Identification means in European Society in the 15-17 Centuries." Materials Science and Engineering 667 (2019). IOP Science.
- "Transcript of the Trial of Veronese." Khan Academy. 2020.
- Norman Land, "Poetic License" in The Potted Tree: Essays in Venetian Art, Camden House, 1994, 57–70.
- Partridge, Loren W. Art of Renaissance Venice, 1400-1600. University of California Press, 2015.
- Rosand, David. "Theater and Structure in the Art of Paolo Veronese." The Art Bulletin 55, no. 2 (1973): 225–235.
- Rosand, David. Painting in Sixteenth-Century Venice: Titian, Veronese, Tintoretto. Cambridge UP, 2nd ed, 1997.
