= Deutsche Barockgalerie =

Art museum in Augsburg, Germany

Coordinates: 48°21′54″N 10°53′57″E

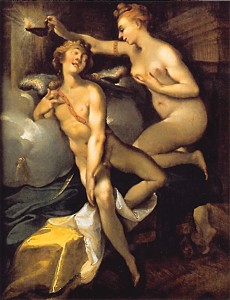
Joseph Heintz the Elder (1564–1609): "Amor and Psyche" (c 1605), now in the Deutsche Barockgalerie

The Deutsche Barockgalerie is an art gallery housed in the Schaezlerpalais in Augsburg. It was set up in 1958 and displays works from the Baroque period from the city's collection (the Städtische Kunstsammlungen Augsburg) and from private lenders. The magnificent and extensive collection on display includes works by Caravaggio, Dürer, Holbein, Tiepolo, and Cranach.
