= Pietro Negri =

Italian painter (1628–1679)

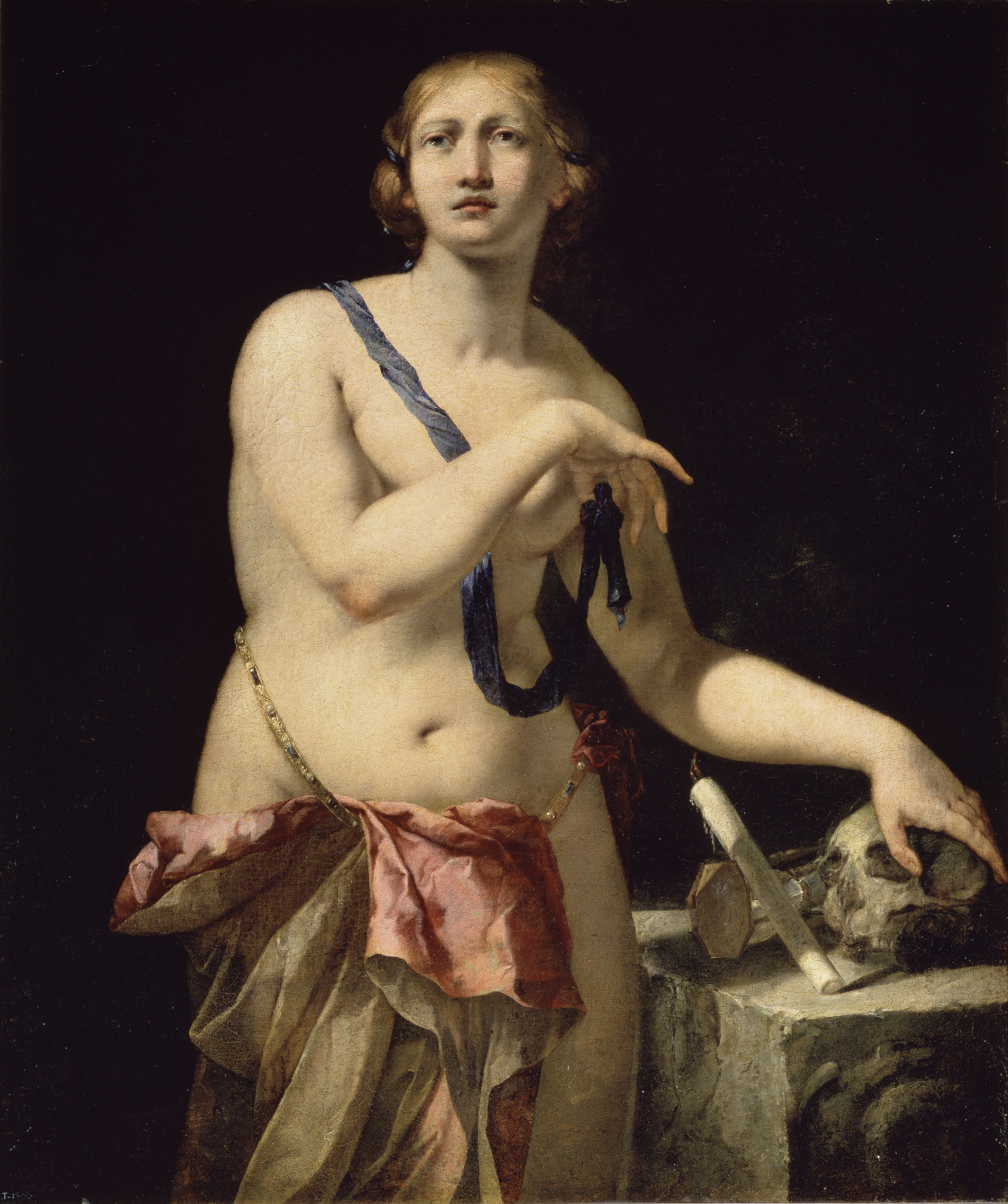
Vanitas, originally attributed to Antonio Zanchi

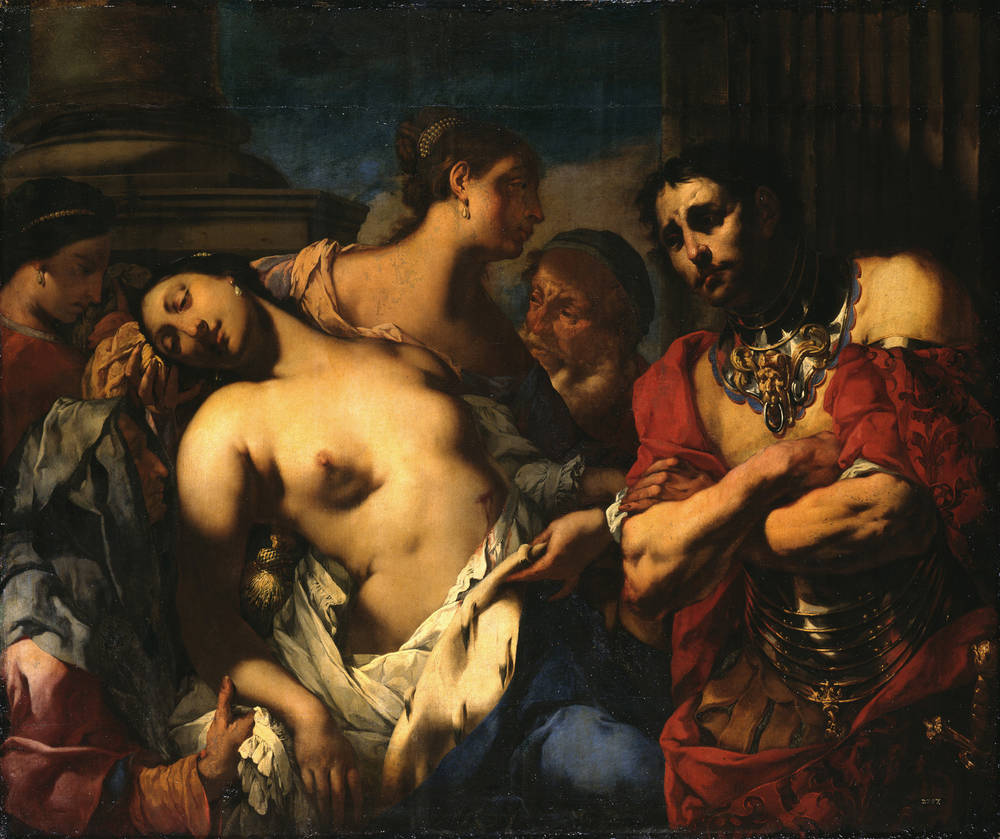
Nero Examining the Corpse of Agrippina

Pietro Negri (1628, Venice - 31 May 1679, Venice) was an Italian painter in the Baroque style who belonged to the so-called "tenebrosi" (dark or gloomy ones).

== Biography ==
He was likely born in Venice. Early sources assumed that he was the son of a sculptor named Domenico Negri, but his father's name is given as Lunardo in some documents and Francesco in others. His first art lessons came from Matteo Ponzone. Later, he worked with Francesco Ruschi. In his early days, much of his work is difficult to distinguish, stylistically, from Antonio Zanchi.

His first verified work is from 1658, when he signed an engraving on the frontispiece of Antioco by the poet, Nicolò Minato. The paintings attributed to him, prior to the 1660s, are all missing. A painting of Antonio e Cleopatra is dated from c.1664. In 1670, he produced the Albero serafico dei Ordini francescani (Seraphic Tree of the Franciscans), currently at the basilica of Santa Maria Gloriosa dei Frari. One of his best known works is Nerone che esamina il corpo di Agrippina (Nero Examining the Corpse of Agrippina), in the collection of the Gemäldegalerie Alte Meister in Dresden.

He married Franceschina Maria Barbara, with whom he had two sons. She died shortly after giving birth to the second and he remarried in 1673, to Angela Caroli, the widow of a merchant.

In 1673, he created what many consider to be his masterpiece; a monumental "telero" (canvas applied directly to a wall) depicting Mark the Evangelist and Saint Rocco, who interceded with the Virgin Mary to end a plague in Venice, on the left wall of the staircase at the Scuola Grande di San Rocco, opposite a depiction of the plague of 1630, by Zanchi.

He also took the occasional student; notably the Late Baroque painter, Simone Brentana.

He died of what is believed to have been tuberculosis. He was interred, at his widow's expense, in the Church of Saint Augustine, which was demolished in 1873, after many years of serving as a mill.
