= Giovanni Segala =

Italian painter

- Born: 1663; Murano
- Died: 1720 (aged 56–57); Venice
- Occupation: Painter

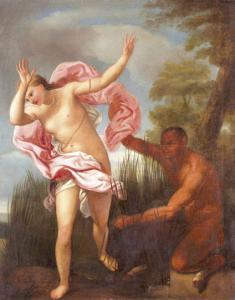
Pan and Syrinx

Giovanni Segala (1663–1720) was a Venetian painter.

== Life ==
Giovanni Segala was born in Murano in 1663. He studied under Antonio Zanchi. He was also a pupil of Pietro della Vecchia and was influenced by his contemporary Gregorio Lazzarini. He undertook work for Venetian churches such as San Pantalon and San Martino. The San Clemente Church on the Isola di San Clemente has one of his paintings. He gained a solid reputation for his depictions of historical subjects. Between 1688 and 1692 he worked for the Marquis von Platen in Hanover.

== Style ==
Segala was one of the more distinguished of the Venetian artists of the 18th century, although not the equal of masters such as Giovanni Battista Tiepolo or Sebastiano Ricci. He developed a fluid style with delicate colors and a soft light. He followed his teachers in using deep shadows in his work, perhaps excessively, but made skilled use of illumination. The picture of the Conception, which he made for the college of La Carità, was highly praised by Zanetti and is said to be equal to those of the finest artists of his day.

== Gallery ==
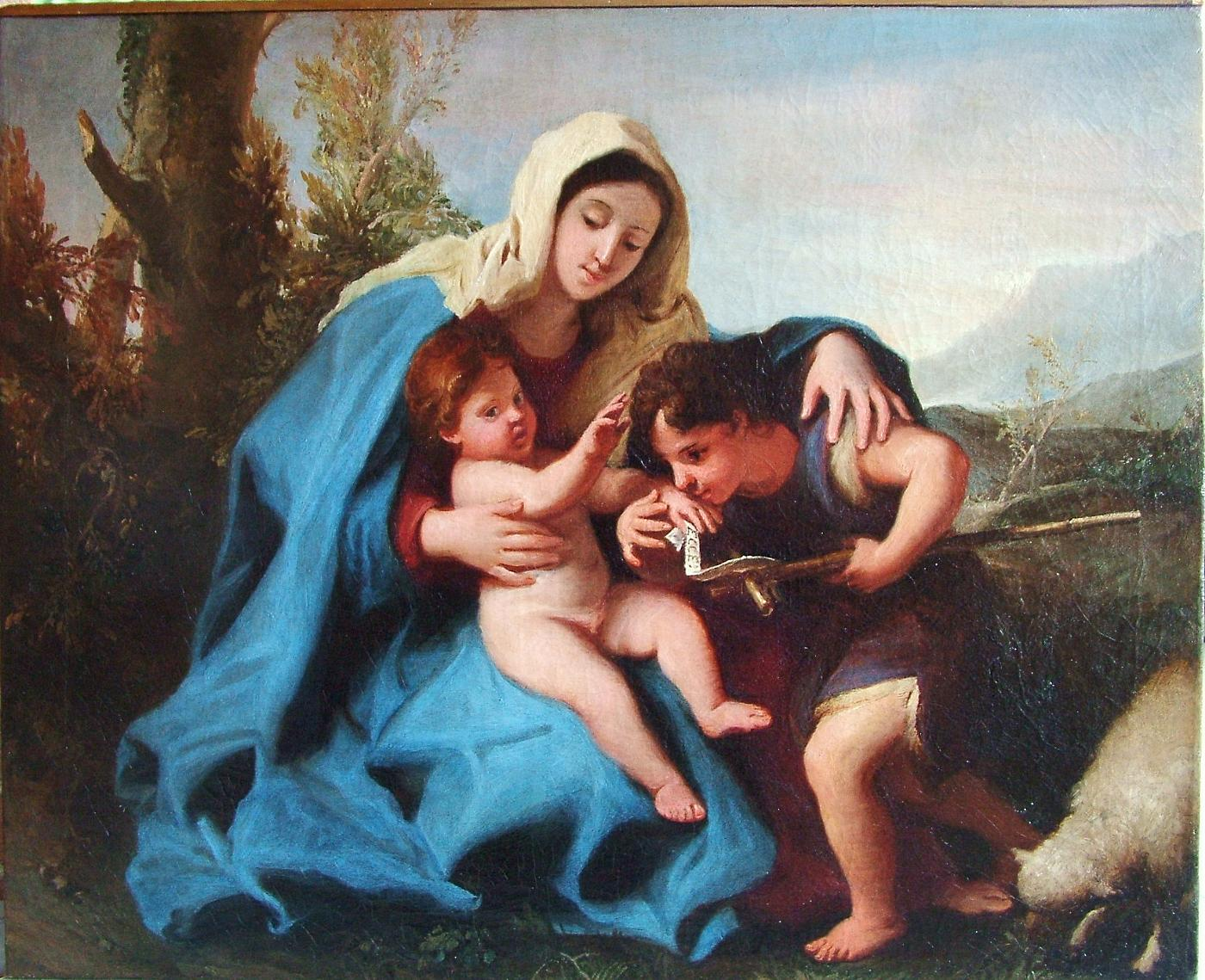
Madonna and Child with the Young Saint John

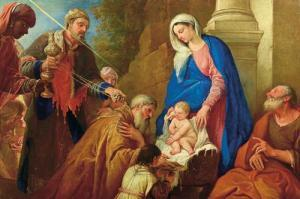
Adoration of the Magi

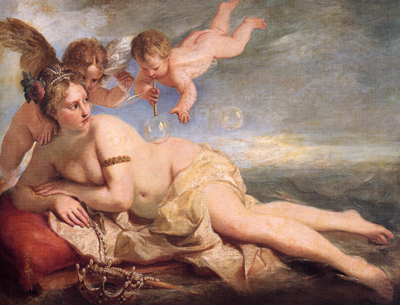
Allegory of Vanity
