= Ruschi =

Ruschi is a surname of Italian origin. Notable people with the surname include:

- Francesco Ruschi (c.1610-1661), Italian painter
- Augusto Ruschi (1915–1986), Brazilian agronomist, ecologist and naturalist
