= San Martino, Venice =

Church in Venice, Italy

San Martino
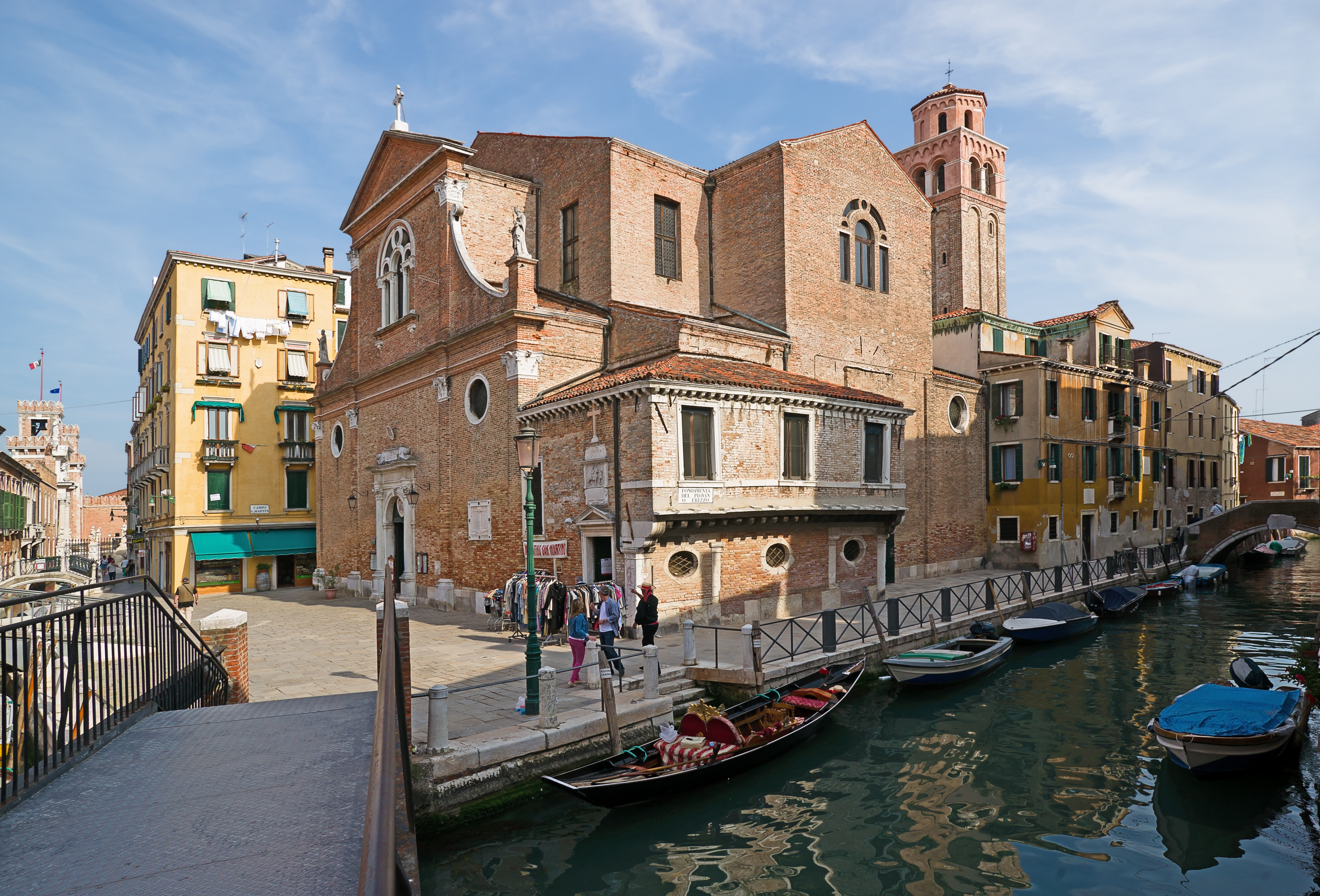

- Location within Venice Location within Italy

Religion
- Affiliation: Roman Catholic
- Province: Venice

Location
- Location: Venice, Italy
- Coordinates: 45.4346°N 12.349°E

Architecture
- Type: Renaissance

San Martino is a Renaissance Roman Catholic church in the sestiere of Castello of Venice, northern Italy.

== History ==
The church now stands near the Arsenale, and is officiated by a military chaplain. Initially founded in the 10th century, from 1546 to 1610 it was rebuilt based on a plan by Jacopo Sansovino.

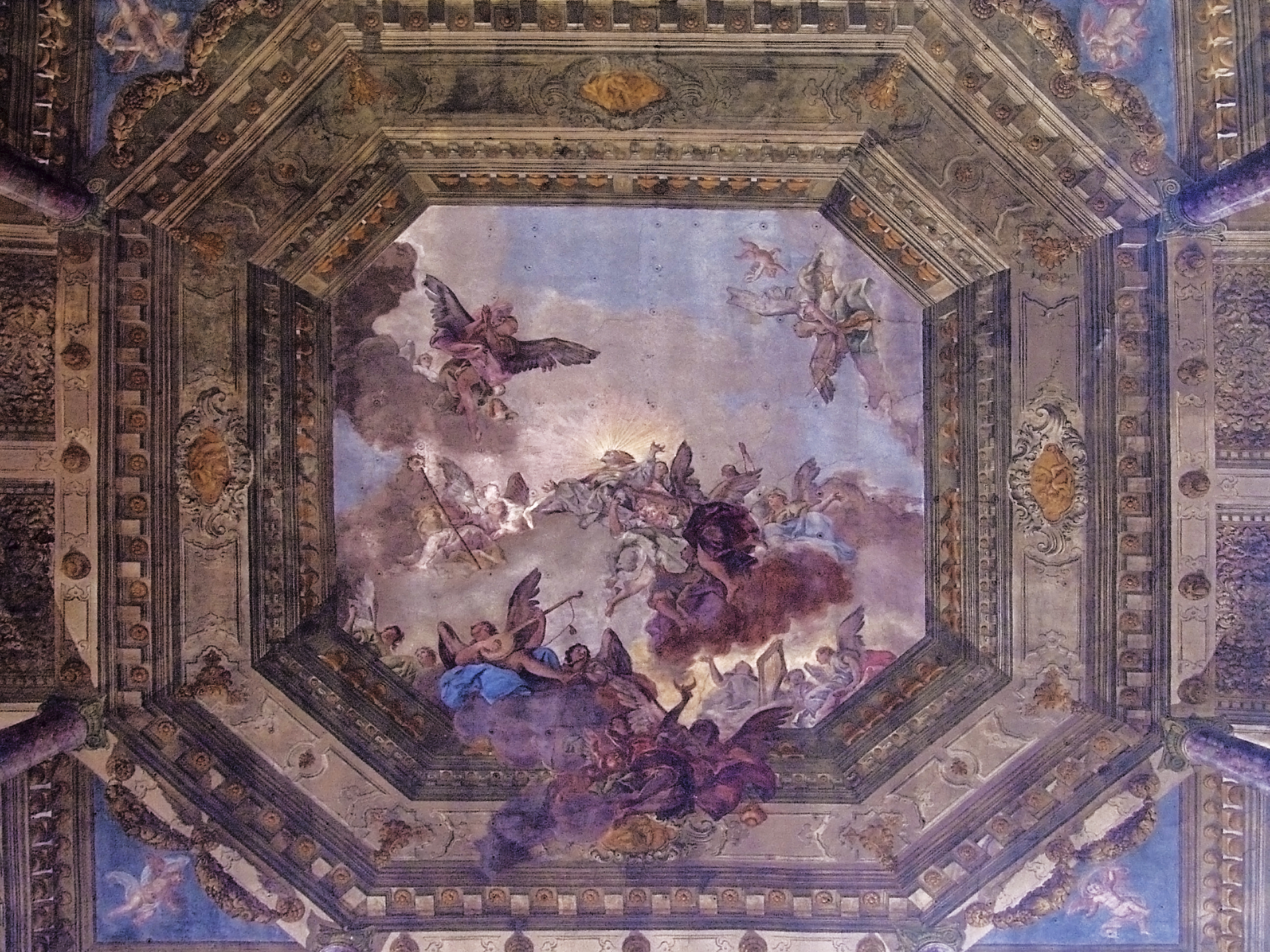
The central ceiling fresco from Domenico Bruni.

== Description ==
The facade (1897) was designed by Federico Berchet and Domenico Rupolo. The vault is frescoed with Saint Martin in Glory by Jacopo Guarana, with the quadratura painted by Domenico Bruni. The walls portray saints and evangelists by Matteo Zais. A funeral monument (1633) to Doge Francesco Erizzo was completed by Matteo Carneri. A chapel has a fresco cycle of the Glory of the Eucharist flanked by Sacrifice of Isaac and Sacrifice of Mechizedek on the walls by Fabio Canal. The 15th-century altar by Tullio Lombardo was brought here from the church of Santo Sepolcro. The sacristy is frescoed with a Last Supper (1549) and Resurrection by Girolamo da Santacroce. The church has a Risen Christ altarpiece by Santacroce. The sacristy ceiling is frescoed by Antonio Zanchi and Domenico Bruni.

The organ was constructed by Pietro Nachini and restored by Gaetano Callido. The first altar on the right has a St Cecilia and St Lorenzo Giustiniani by Giovanni Segala.

The church contains the funereal monument of Doge Francesco Erizzo designed by Mattia Carnero in 1633. The next altar towards the presbytery contains the canvas of Holy Family with St Mark and Bishop Foca by Giovanni Laudis. The third altar has a Madonna in Sorrow by Palma il Giovane, next to Three angels with symbols of the passion and a Deposition by the same painter.

The pulpit was carved by Sebastiano Messenali (1752), and the small altar by Tullio Lombardo. There are also a St John the Evangelist writes the Apocalyptic Gospels by Matteo Ponzone.

== Sources ==
- Manno, Antonio (2004). The Treasures of Venice. Rizzoli. p. 234.
