= Giovanni Bonagrazia =

Italian painter

Giovanni Bonagrazia (born in 1654) was an Italian painter, active in Treviso in a Mannerist style.

== Biography ==
He was a pupil of Antonio Zanchi, and active until late 17th-century.

For church of Sant'Agostino in Treviso, he painted canvases with an Annunciation, St John Baptist, St Jerome, the Archangel Gabriel, St Sebastian, and Mary Magdalen. He also painted a God the Father and Angels on an altar tabernacle in the chapel of the Crucifix in the church of San Gaetano in Padua.
