= Antonio Molinari (painter) =

Italian painter (1655–1704)

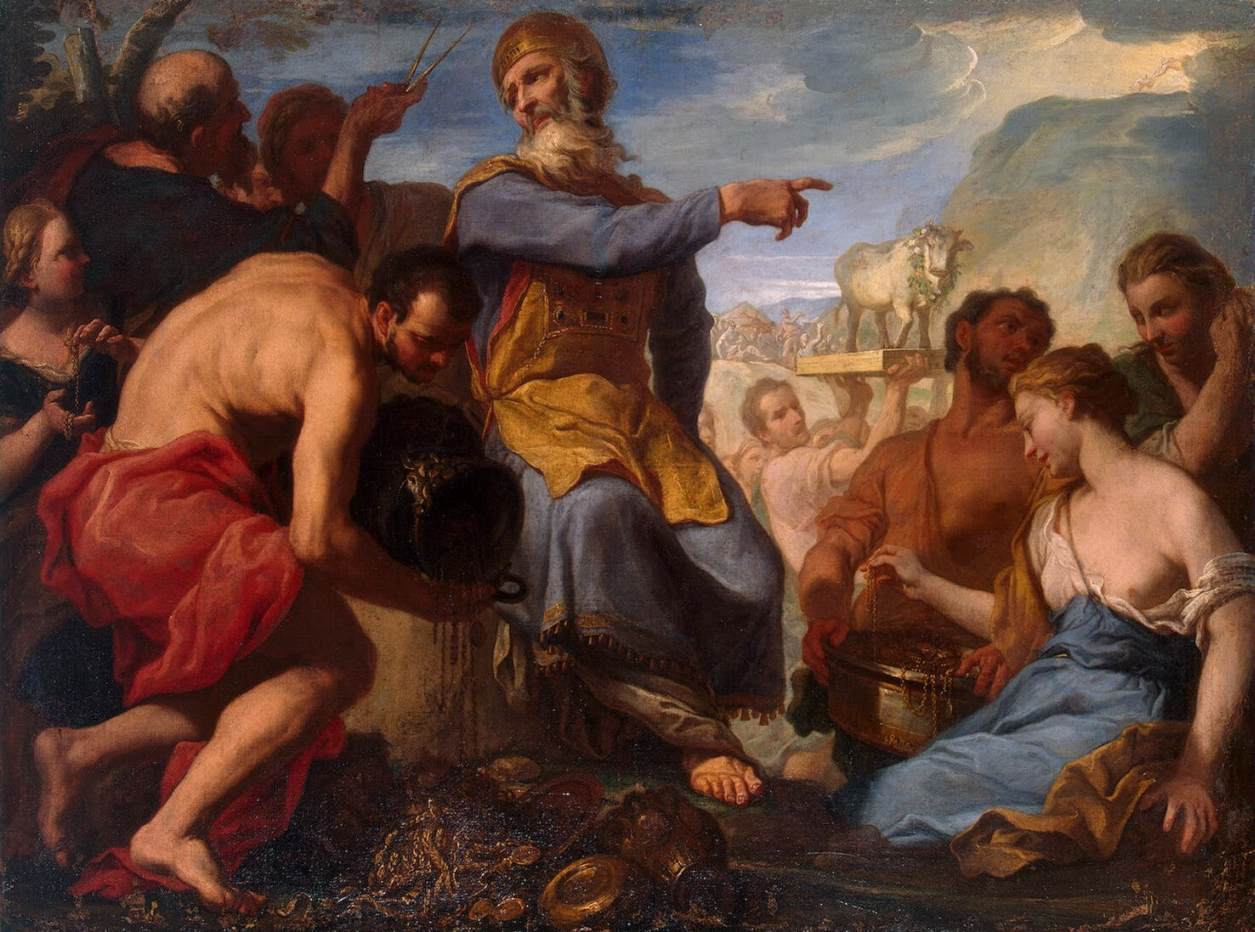
- Antonio Molinari, Adoration of the golden calf (1700–1702), Hermitage Museum, Saint Petersburg
- Born: 21 January 1655; Venice, Republic of Venice
- Died: 3 February 1704 (aged 49); Venice, Republic of Venice
- Other name: Il Caraccino
- Education: Antonio Zanchi
- Occupation: painter
- Movement: Baroque

Antonio Molinari, also known as il Caraccino, (21 January 1655 – 3 February 1704) was an Italian painter of the Baroque era in Venice.

== Biography ==
The son of a painter, Molinari was apprenticed to Antonio Zanchi in Venice. He was strongly influenced by the vigorous and athletic paintings of Neapolitan painters such as Luca Giordano. He typically painted tumultuous narratives of mythology and religion in large canvases. Many of Molinari’s drawings survive, a large number in Düsseldorf (Museum Kunstpalast). His preliminary studies for known paintings, laid out in free and flowing ink and chalk lines with wash and hatching to indicate tone, show great speed and fluency in the conception of compositional schemes. Molinari has been called an artist of transition, but he was never a direct precursor of Venetian 18th-century styles. His voluminous, firmly modelled forms and his rich, deep colours remained rooted in the Baroque. He had few followers, but his pupil Giovanni Battista Piazzetta carried some elements of his style into the next century.

== Works ==
His works include:

- Feeding of the Five Thousand (1690; San Pantalon, Venice)
- Darius and His Family Before Alexander (1690)
- Judith with the Head of Holofernes (1690)
- Death of Uzzah (c. 1695; Santa Maria degli Angeli in Murano)
- Fight of Centaurs and Lapiths (c. 1698, Ca' Rezzonico).
- The Boy Moses Stepping on Pharaoh's Crown (c. 1690s–1704), Museum Kunstpalast
- Adoration of the Golden Calf (1700–1702), The Hermitage Museum, Saint Petersburg
- Adam and Eve (1701–1704), David Owsley Museum of Art
- David and Abigail

== Gallery ==
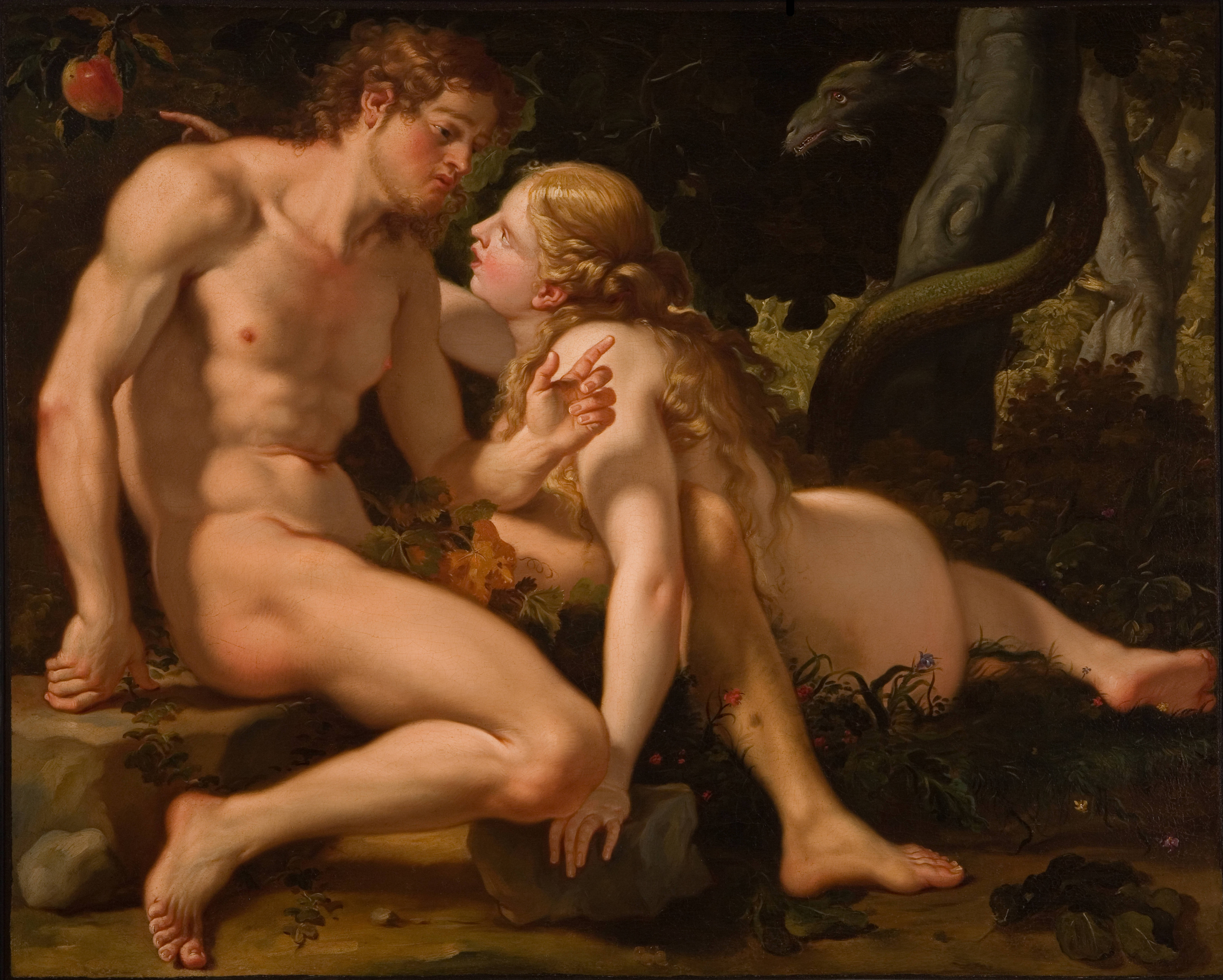
Adam and Eve, David Owsley Museum of Art, Muncie, Indiana

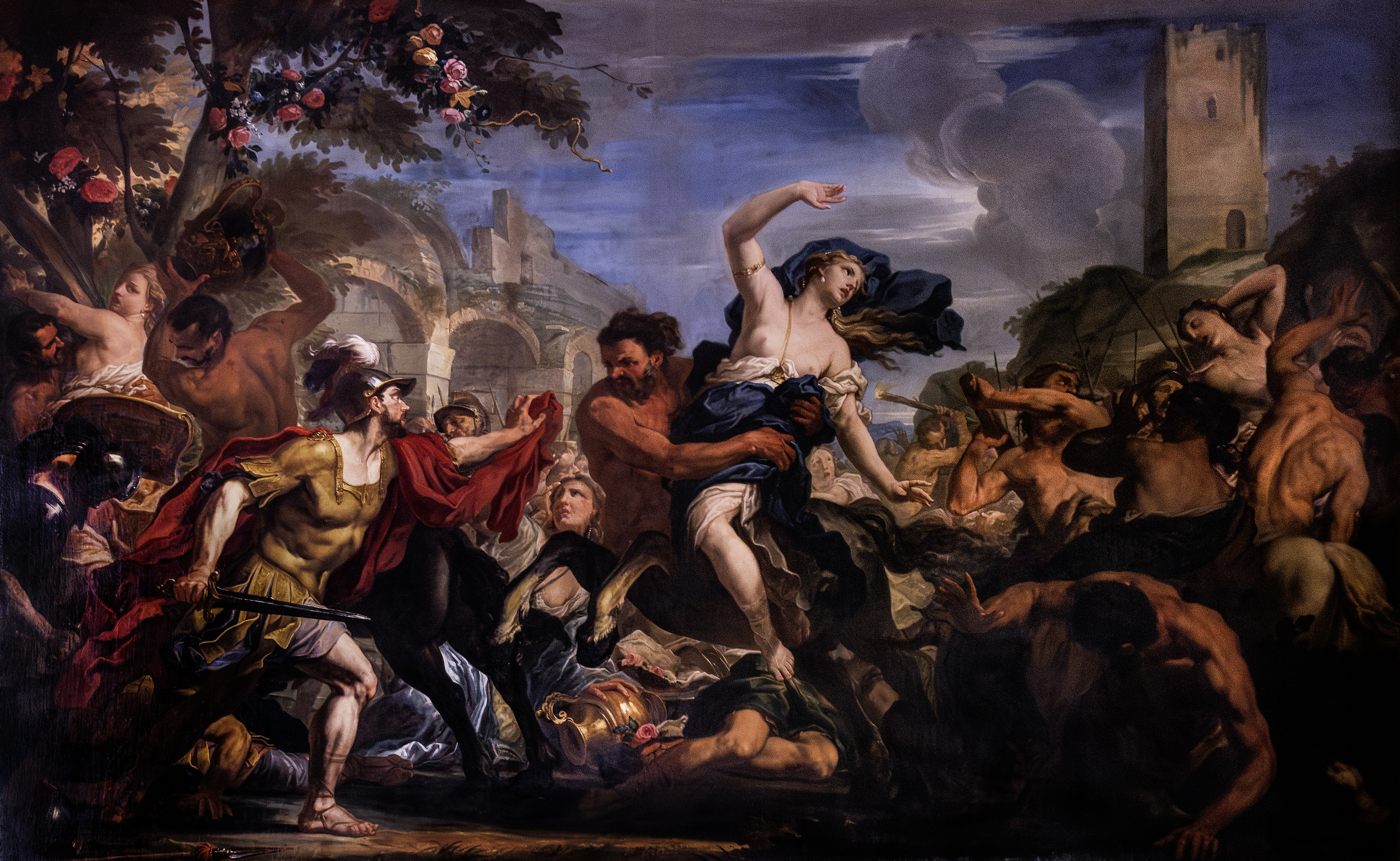
Battle between centaurs and lapiths, Ca' Rezzonico, Venice

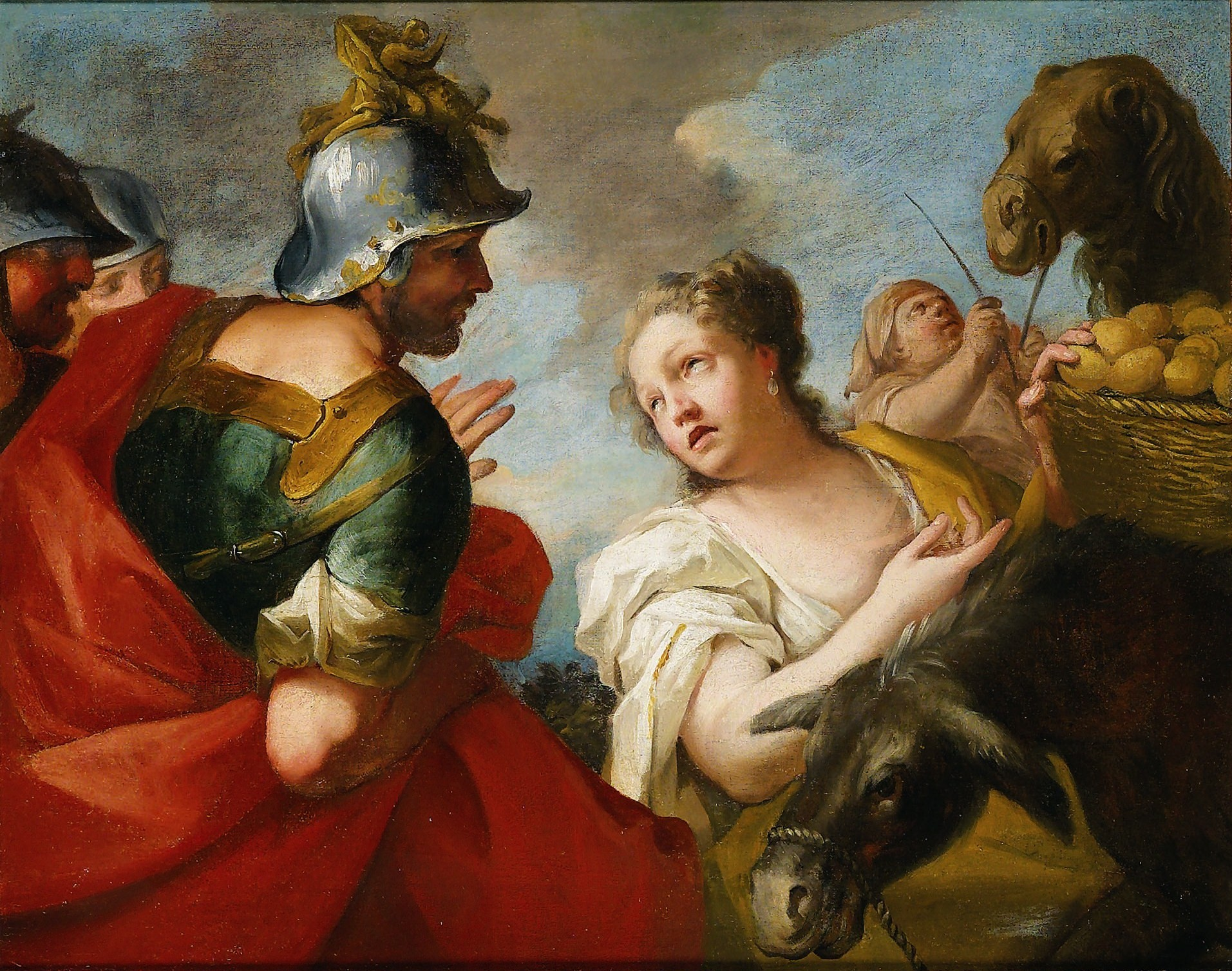
David and Abigail, priv. col.

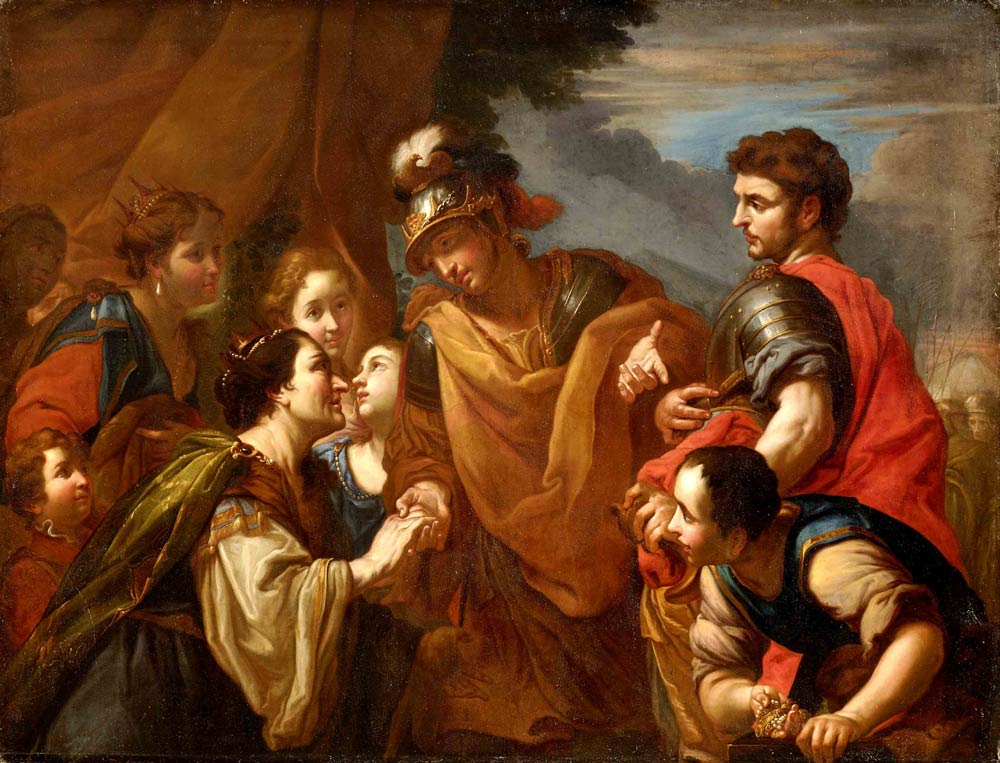
Darius and his family before Alexander, priv. col.

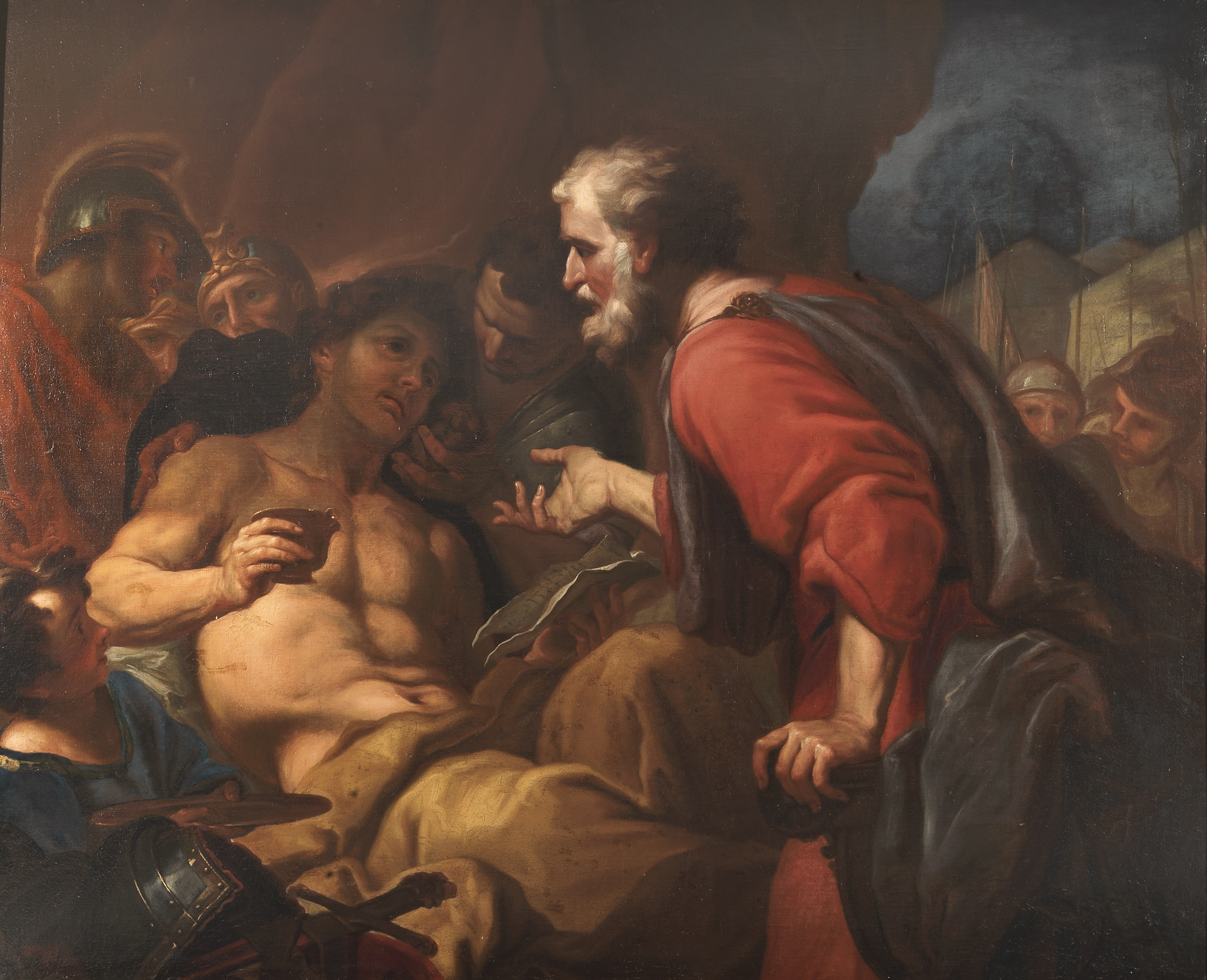
The Will of Cato the Younger, Collezione Mainetti, Rome

== Sources ==
- Wittkower, Rudolf (1993). Art and Architecture Italy, 1600–1750. Harmondsworth: Penguin Books. pp. 349–350.
- Green, Richard C. (2003). "Molinari, Antonio". Grove Art Online. Oxford University Press. doi:10.1093/gao/9781884446054.article.T058911.
