= Matteo Ponzone =

Italian painter

Matteo Ponzone (17th century) was an Italian painter of the Baroque period, active between 1630 and 1700 mainly in Venice. He was a pupil of Santo Peranda. Several of his works are in the churches and public buildings of Venice, particularly in San Giorgio Maggiore, and in the church of the "Padri Croceferi".

== Life ==
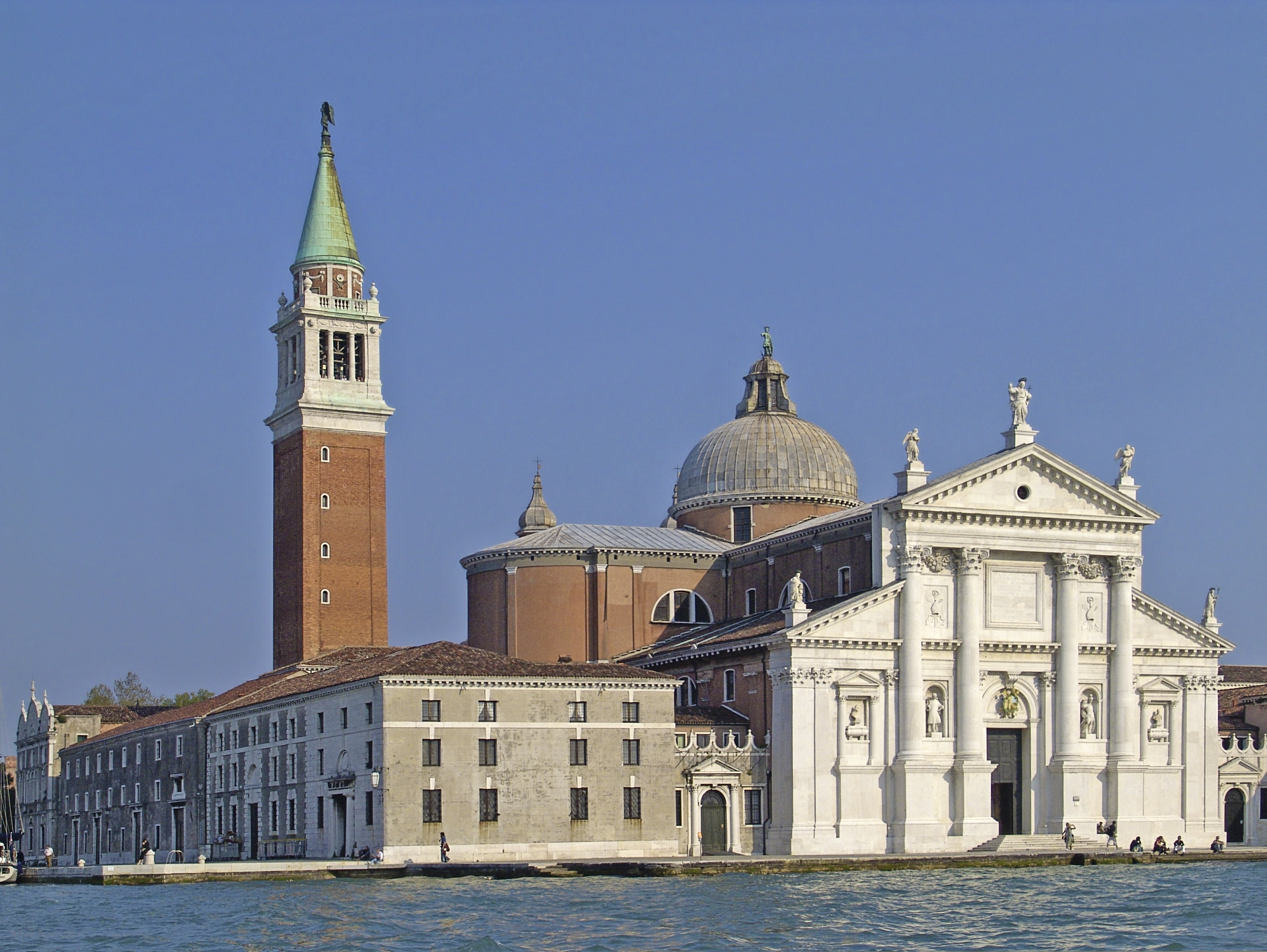
The Basilica of San Giorgio Maggiore, where the main works of Matteo Ponzone are kept.

According to several sources, Ponzone was born in Venice, identified as «Mathi et Simon fiol de noble Patron Claudio Bolzon et Agnesina Negro equal in Madonna» born in the parish of Saint Moses November 9, 1583. Some other sources reported his date of birth approximately in 1586 in Rab, in the far north of Dalmatia, that time owned by Republic of Venice.

Matteo Ponzone operated mainly in Venice, unless an interim period of ten years spent in Dalmatia, leaving their works in various locations of the coast.

Ponzone was young student of Jacopo Palma the Younger, and was related to the painter Sante Peranda, who was probably one of his teachers and whose influence is evident in the work of Ponzone. He joined the Fraglia dei Pittori of Venice from 1613 to 1633, being one of the busiest in town throughout this period. In his workshop he had as pupils Antonio Zanchi, Andrea Celesti, Pietro Negri, and Giovanni Carboncino, who assist him in various paintings orders of the last Venetian period.

The large amount of work left in situ adequately define the importance for the history of Venetian painting of the first '600, although the significance was detected only in recent years. Similarly, the caliber of orders received -those of particular importance include works in the churches of San Giorgio Maggiore, Madonna dell'Orto, and San Cassiano - account for the great success and wide contribution of Ponzone to Venetian artistic history.

== Major works ==
=== In Venice ===
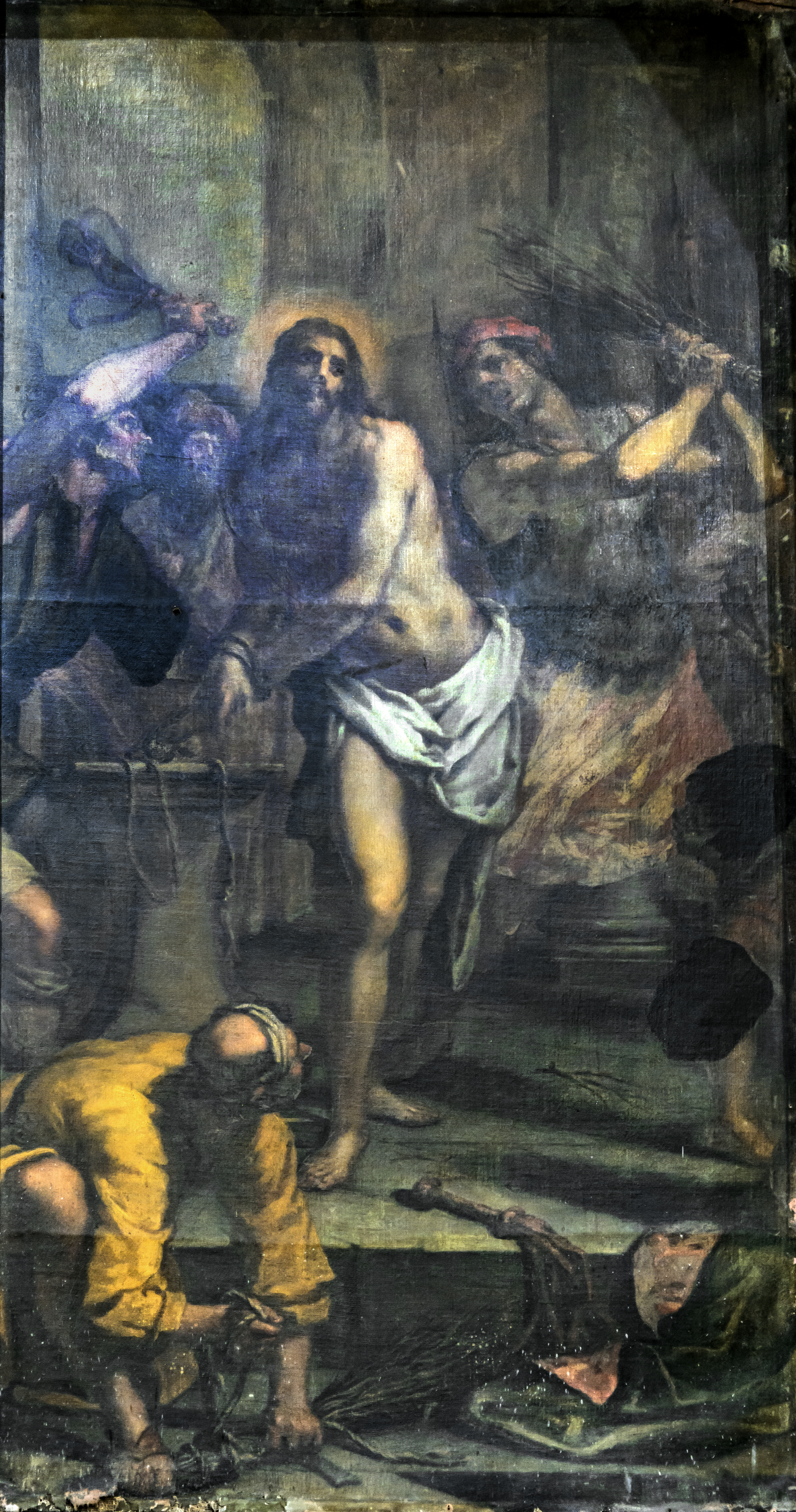
Flagellation of Jesus. Madonna dell'Orto

- Church of Madonna dell'Orto (Our Lady of the Garden): a series of portraits of saints, theSt George slaying the dragon with Saints Jerome and Tryphon, the Flagellation of Jesus.
- San Giorgio Maggiore; St George slaying the dragon
- San Cassiano: Christ on the cross and four Saints
- Church of San Martino: St John writing the Apocalypse. Considered one of his masterpieces, is clearly inspired by Tintoretto.

=== In other regions of the Republic of Venice ===
- Adoration of the Magi and Annunciation, today in the museum of Treviso.
- A series of paintings for the Basilica of Saint Anthony of Padua.
- A series of paintings now in the museum of Cividale.
- Santa Barbara at the Cathedral of Koper (Capodistria).
- Stories of the Eucharist (eight paintings), Saints Jerome, Francis and Catherine, in the Cathedral of Split. Il Ciclo di San Doimo in the same cathedral. The work was begun in 1639 by Ponzone but not completed.
- Portrait of San Lorenzo Giustiniani also in Split.
- Attributed to Ponzone are twenty paintings in the ceiling of the church of San Francesco Šibenik, as well as other paintings of saints.
- The Last Supperin the refectory of the Franciscan convent of Hvar.

== Bibliography ==
- Kruno Prijateli, Le opere di Matteo Ponzone in Dalmazia, in Arte Veneta, XX, 1966, pp. 153–154.
- Luciano Rota, Matteo e Sforza Ponzone, in Francesco Semi-Vanni Tacconi (cur.), Istria e Dalmazia, Uomini e Tempi. Dalmazia, Del Bianco, Udine 1992
- Bryan, Michael (1889). Walter Armstrong; Robert Edmund Graves (eds.). Dictionary of Painters and Engravers, Biographical and Critical. Vol. II L-Z. London: George Bell and Sons. p. 309.
