= Ottavio Viviani =

Italian painter

Ottavio Viviani (c. 1579-c. 1641) was an Italian painter of the Baroque period.

Viviani was born in Brescia. He was initially a pupil of Tommaso Sandrino. He painted for the royal palace of Monaco and in the Ducal palace of Sassuolo. He specialized in quadratura.
