= Giovanni Carboncino =

Italian painter (c. 1638 – after 1703)

Giovanni Carboncino (c. 1638 – after 1703) was an Italian painter of the Baroque period, active between 1680 and 1692 mainly in Venice. He was born in Treviso, and became a pupil of Matteo Ponzone.

He is also described as a imitator of Titian. He painted canvases for the church of San Nicolo in Treviso. He painted for the Duomo of Curzuola and churches in Istria.

One of his works was donated to the church of San Nicola a Tolentino.

== Selected works ==
Portrait of doge Francesco Morosini on horseback Correr Museum

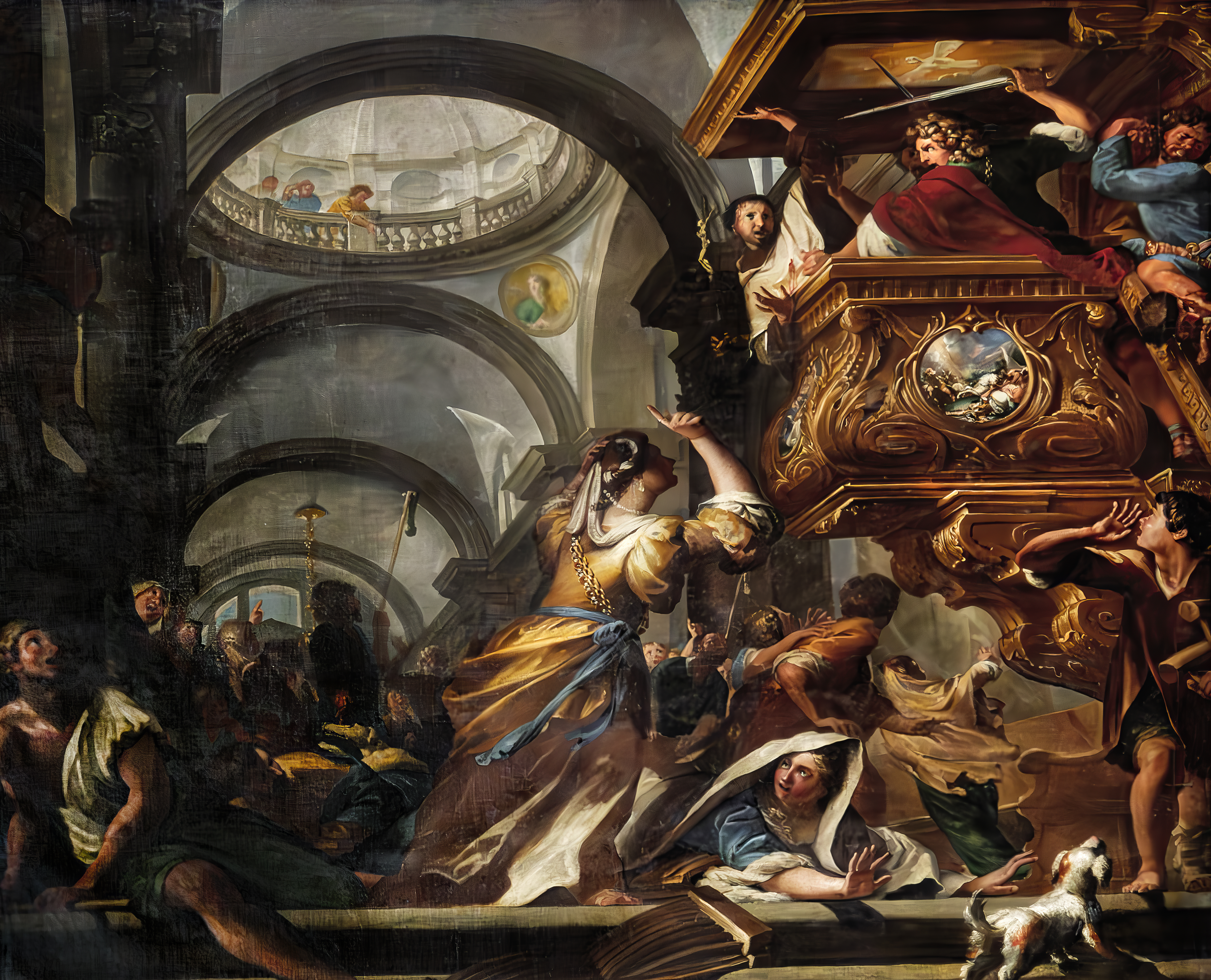
Murder of Saint Angelo of Sicily, Santa Maria dei Carmini
