= Domenico Bruni =

Italian painter

Domenico Bruni (c. 1600–1666) was an Italian painter of the Baroque period, mainly active in Brescia.

He trained with Tommaso Sandrino. He helped decorate the Chorus of the church of the Carmini in Brescia in 1634.

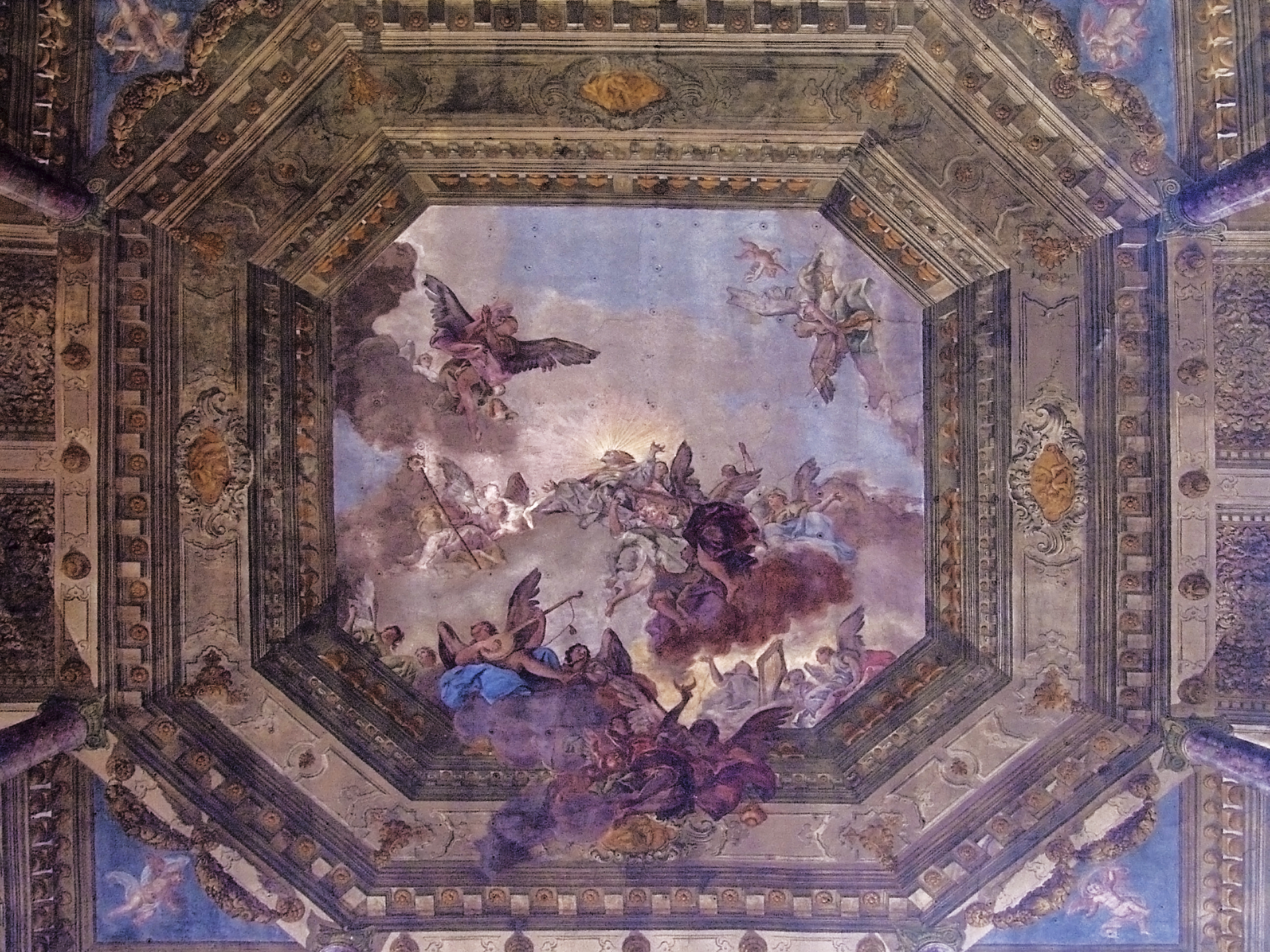
"Glory of San Martino" found in church of San Martino in Venice.
