= Tommaso Sandrino =

Italian painter

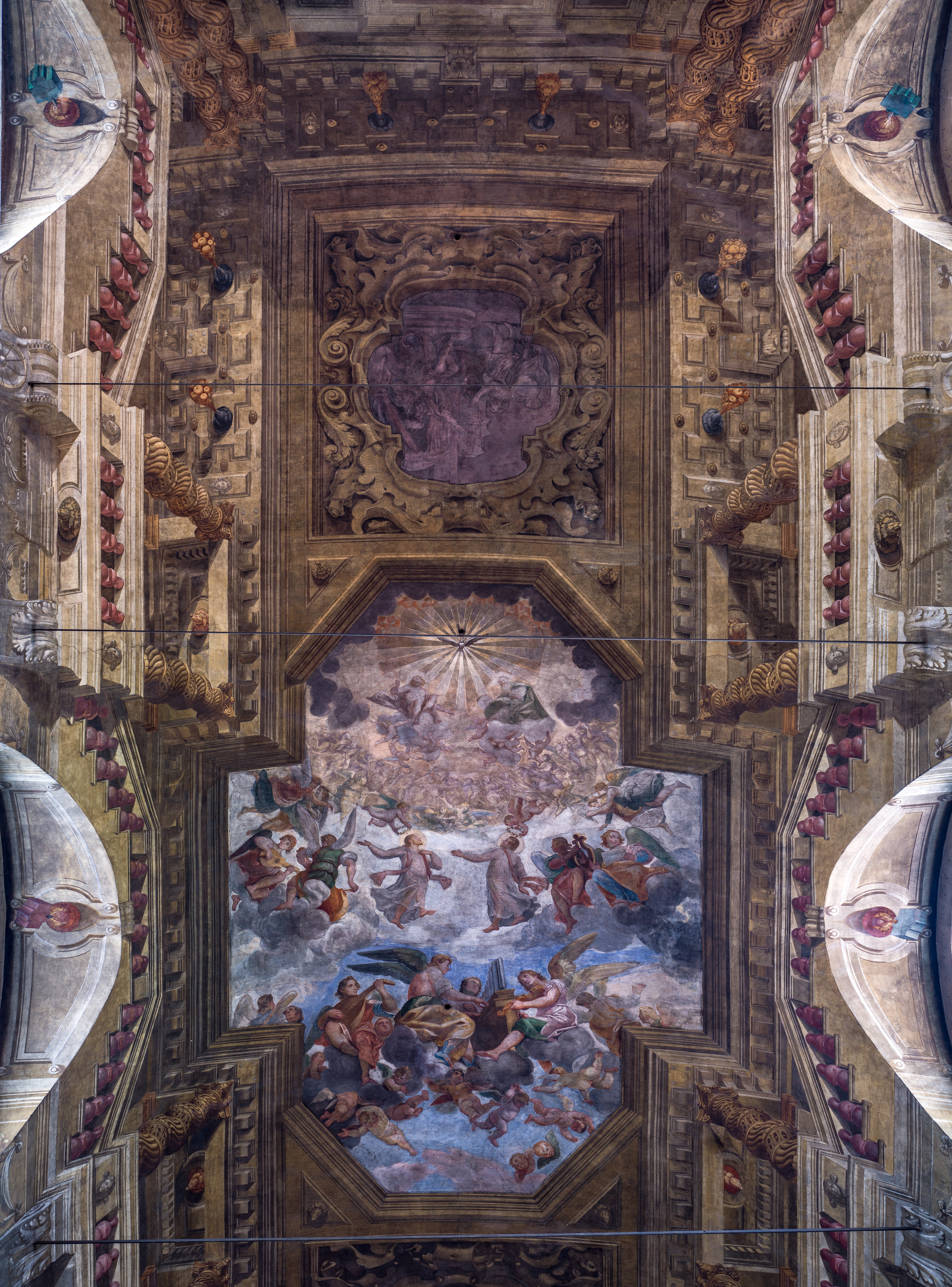
Fresco of the vault in the main nave of the Santi Faustino e Giovita, Brescia by Tommaso Sandrino.

Tomasso Sandrino (1575–1631) (also Sandrini) was an Italian painter of quadratura in Northern Italy, active in his native Brescia.

Among the church ceilings he helped fresco with quadrature are Sant Faustino, San Domenico, Chiesa del Carmine, and the Cathedral of Brescia. He also worked in Milan, Ferrara, and Mirandola.

== Life and works ==
Sandrini was active in quadratura and in architecture. In 1615, he helped decorate the church of San Domenico in Brescia. His brother Pietro worked with Ottavio Viviani in painting the ceiling of Santa Caterina. Among his pupils was Domenico Bruni.

Sandrini painted frescoes for the church of Santi Faustino e Giovita in Brescia. Sandrini painted the ceiling of the church of the Carmini. He was active in painting the cupola of Madonna della Ghiara and the church of San Giovanni in Reggio Emilia; as well as a church in Mirandola. Sandrini died in the town of Palazzolo sull'Oglio.
