= Francesco Ruschi =

Italian painter

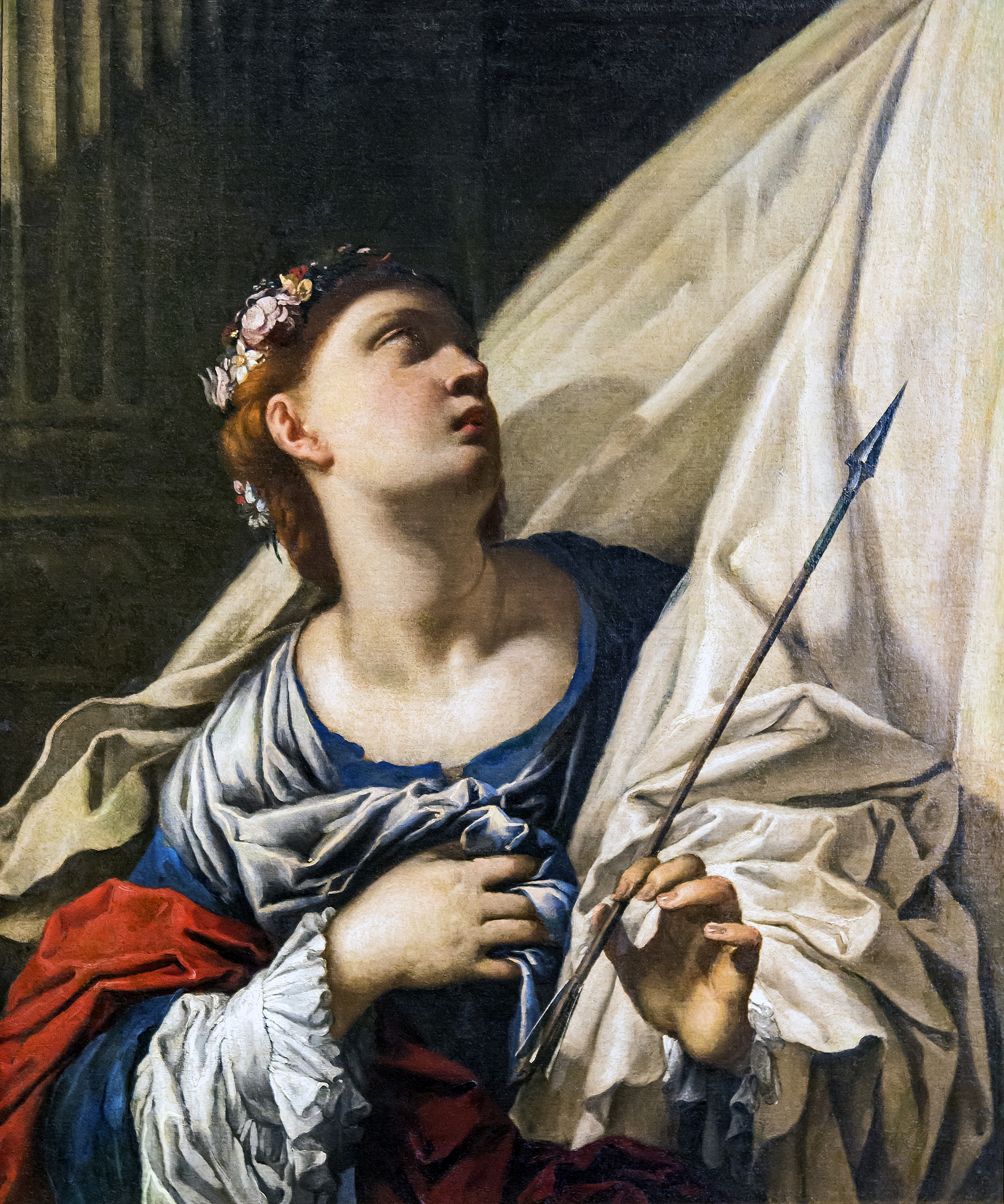
- Saint Ursula Gallerie dell'Accademia
- Born: c. 1610; Rome
- Died: 1661; Treviso
- Occupation: Painter

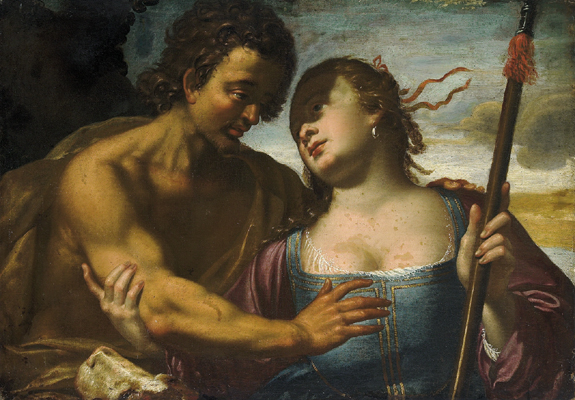
Procris offering Cephalus the dog Laelaps and the spear that never misses the target in exchange for a night of love

Francesco Ruschi was an Italian painter born in Rome around 1610. He studied in Rome under Giuseppe Cesari (Cavalier d'Arpino), Francesco Albani and Pietro da Cortona. His work also shows the influence of Caravaggio. He settled in Venice before 1629. He became a friend of the writer Giovanni Francesco Loredan, for whom he drew the cover pages of several works. He moved to Treviso from 1656, and died there in 1661.

== Work ==
Ruschi was influenced by the paintings of Paolo Veronese in his academic and decorative interpretations. These include Madonna and saints (1641) San Pietro di Castello, Venice; Madonna and saints (c. 1656) San Clemente, Venice; Repudiation of Hagar, Treviso Civic Museum; Saint Ursula, Metropolitan Museum.
