= Antonio Zanchi =

Italian painter (1631–1722)

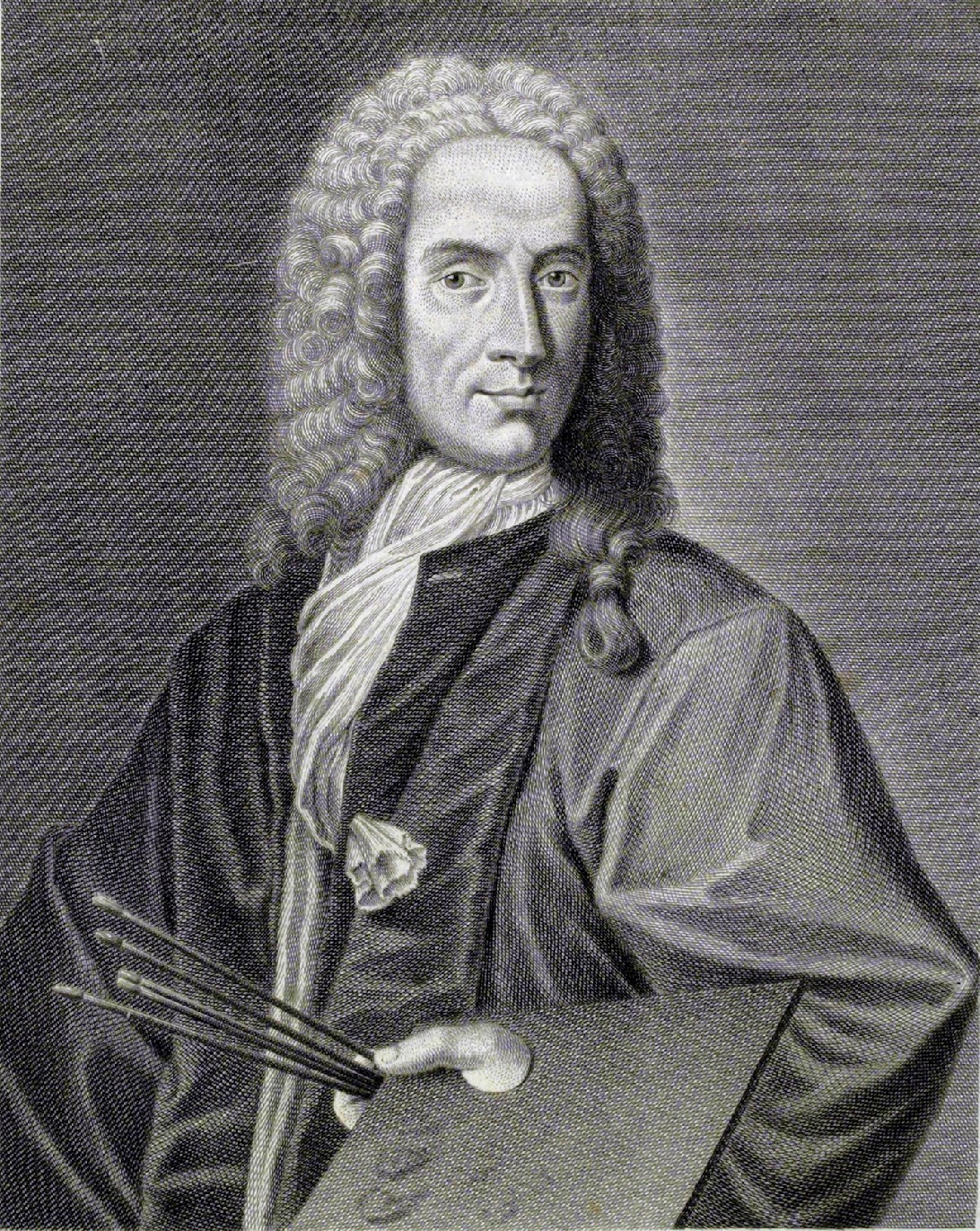
- Portrait by Pietro Antonio Pazzi
- Born: December 6, 1631; Este, Veneto, Republic of Venice
- Died: April 12, 1722 (aged 90); Venice, Republic of Venice
- Education: Francesco Ruschi
- Known for: Painting
- Notable work: Plague of Venice
- Movement: Baroque

Antonio Zanchi (Italian pronunciation: [anˈtɔːnjo dˈdzaŋki]; 6 December 1631 – 12 April 1722) was an Italian painter of the Baroque, active mainly in Venice, but his prolific works can also be seen in Padova, Treviso, Rovigo, Verona, Vicenza, Loreto, Brescia, Milano, and Bergamo, as well as Bavaria.

== Biography ==
Born in Este on 6 December 1631, he trained in Venice with Giacomo Pedrali, Matteo Ponzone and Francesco Ruschi. In his younger years he etched the frontespieces for several opera librettos, including La Statira by Giovanni Francesco Busenello. Deeply influenced by Luca Giordano and Giovan Battista Langetti, he became known in the 1660s as a prominent tenebrist and established himself as a painter of large-scale religious canvases. His first masterpiece was the canvas on the Plague of Venice painted for the Scuola di San Rocco in 1666. In the 1670s he moved to Germany, where he executed works for the Munich Residenz and the Theatine Church, Munich.

During the 1680s Zanchi’s tenebrist style gradually became less pronounced. The contours of his figures became diffused, his colouring flatter, and he lost the dramatic character that had characterized his work of the previous decade. The aging artist was no doubt trying to keep abreast of changes in taste, occasioned particularly by Pietro Liberi and his followers. The works of this period include the ceiling on the Crowning of the Virgin Mary with St. Girolamo Miani (1703) in the Patriarchal Seminary of Venice, next to the Church of Santa Maria della Salute. He also painted a number of canvases for the Venetian church of Santa Maria del Giglio.

Zanchi continued to produce many religious works well into the 18th century, especially for the churches in and around Este (e.g. Adoration of the Magi, 1720; Baone (Calaone), near Este, parish church). He died in Venice on 12 April 1722. Among his pupils were Antonio Molinari and Francesco Trevisani, painters who in their respective ways transformed Zanchi’s Baroque realism into a lighter idiom, consonant with 18th-century taste.

== Work ==
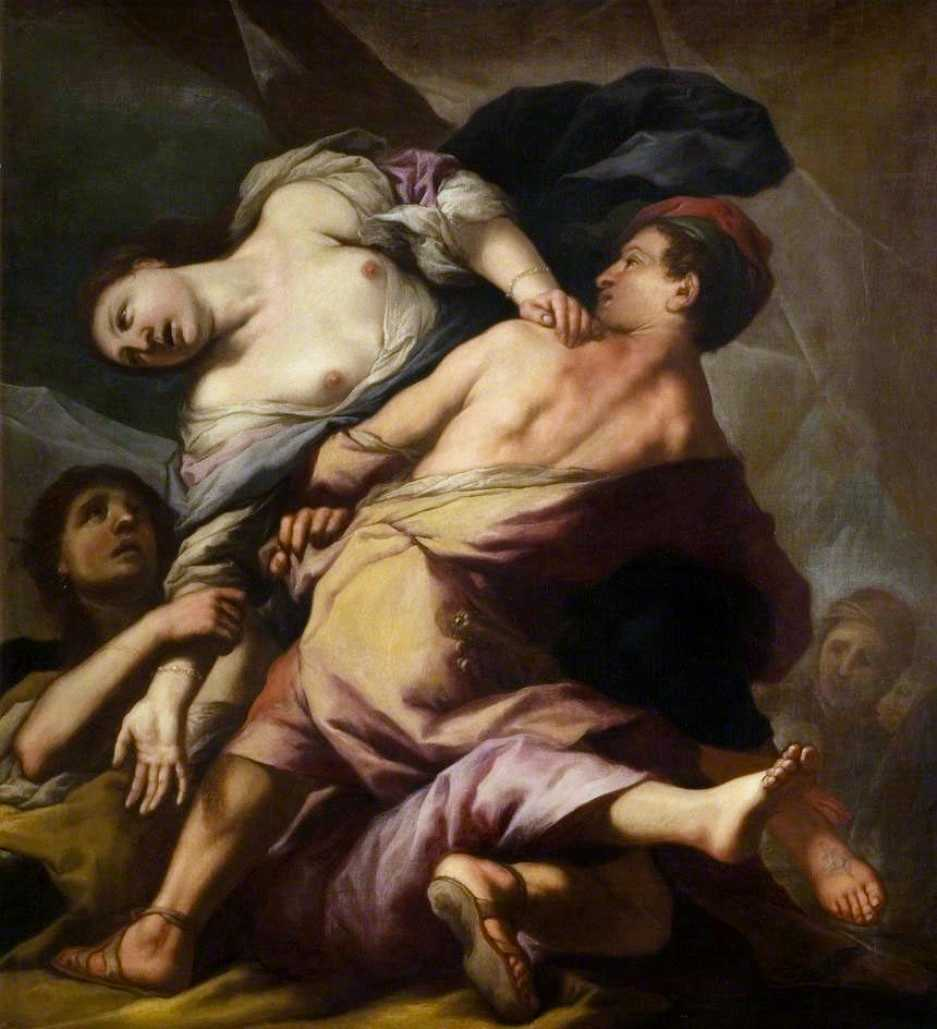
The Abduction of Helen, oil on canvas, Northampton Museum and Art Gallery, Northampton

- Alexander Taking the Body of Darius (1660), Palazzo Albrizzi, Venice
- Abraham Teaches Astrology to the Egyptians (1665), Santa Maria del Giglio, Venice
- Martyr of Saint Julian (1674), St. Julian (San Guiliano), Venice
- Crowning of the Virgin Mary with St. Girolamo Miani (1703), Patriarchal Seminary of Venice
- Universal Law, Scuola di San Fantin, Venice
- Samson and Deliliah
- The death of King Josiah
- Sisyphus, Mauritshuis, The Hague
- Isaac Blesses Jacob
- David and Goliath
- Canvases at the Santa Maria Zobenigo church
- The death of Aggripina, priv.col.
- The Abduction of Helen, Northampton Museum and Art Gallery, Northampton
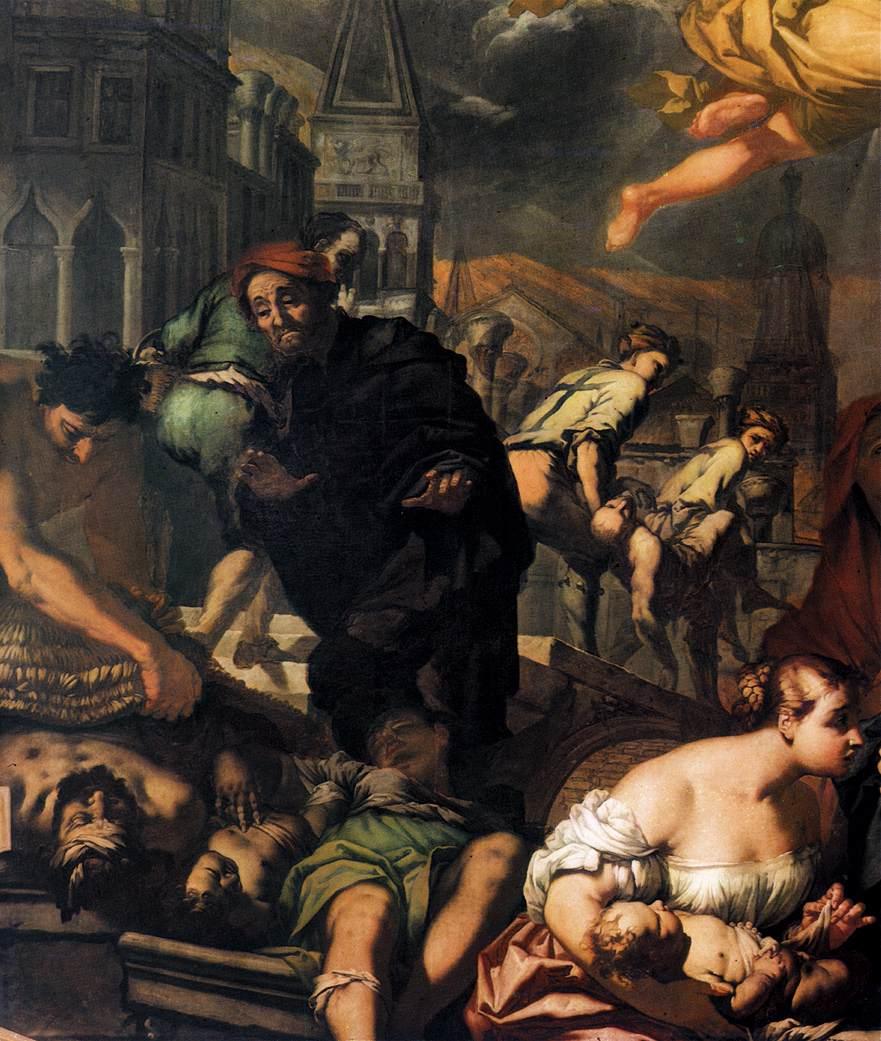
The Virgin Appears to Victims of the Plague

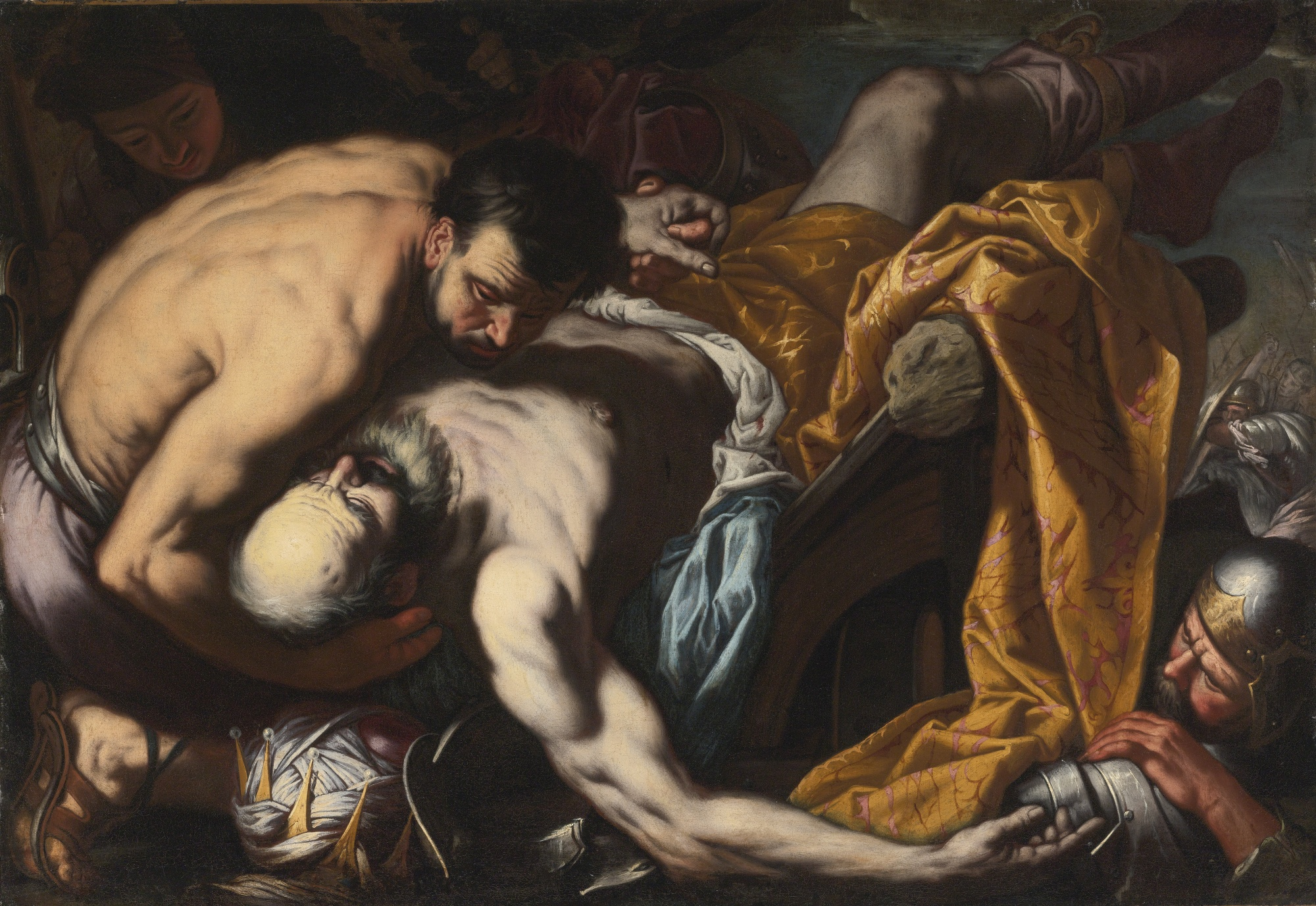
The death of King Josiah

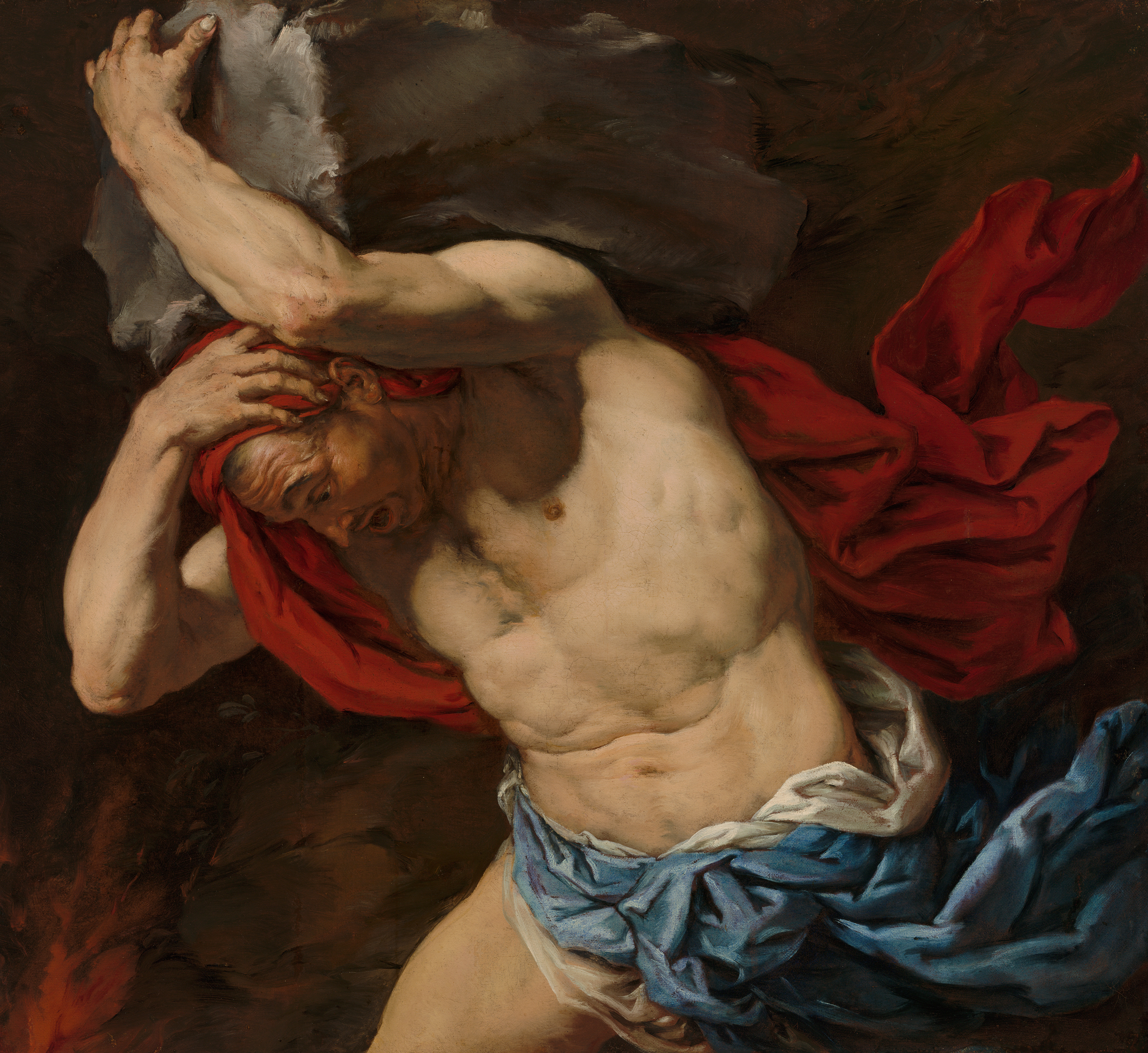
Sisyphus

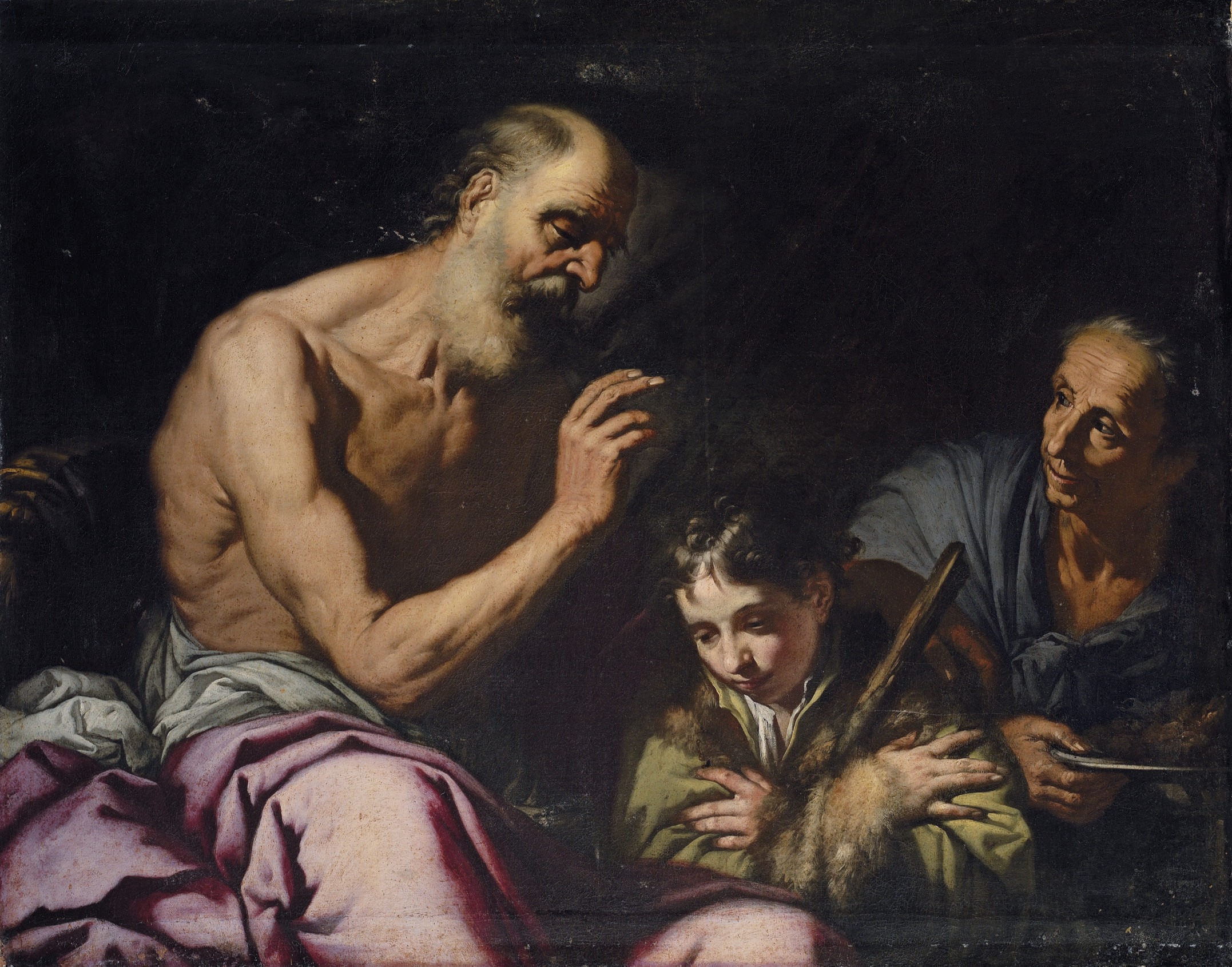
Isaac blesses Jacob

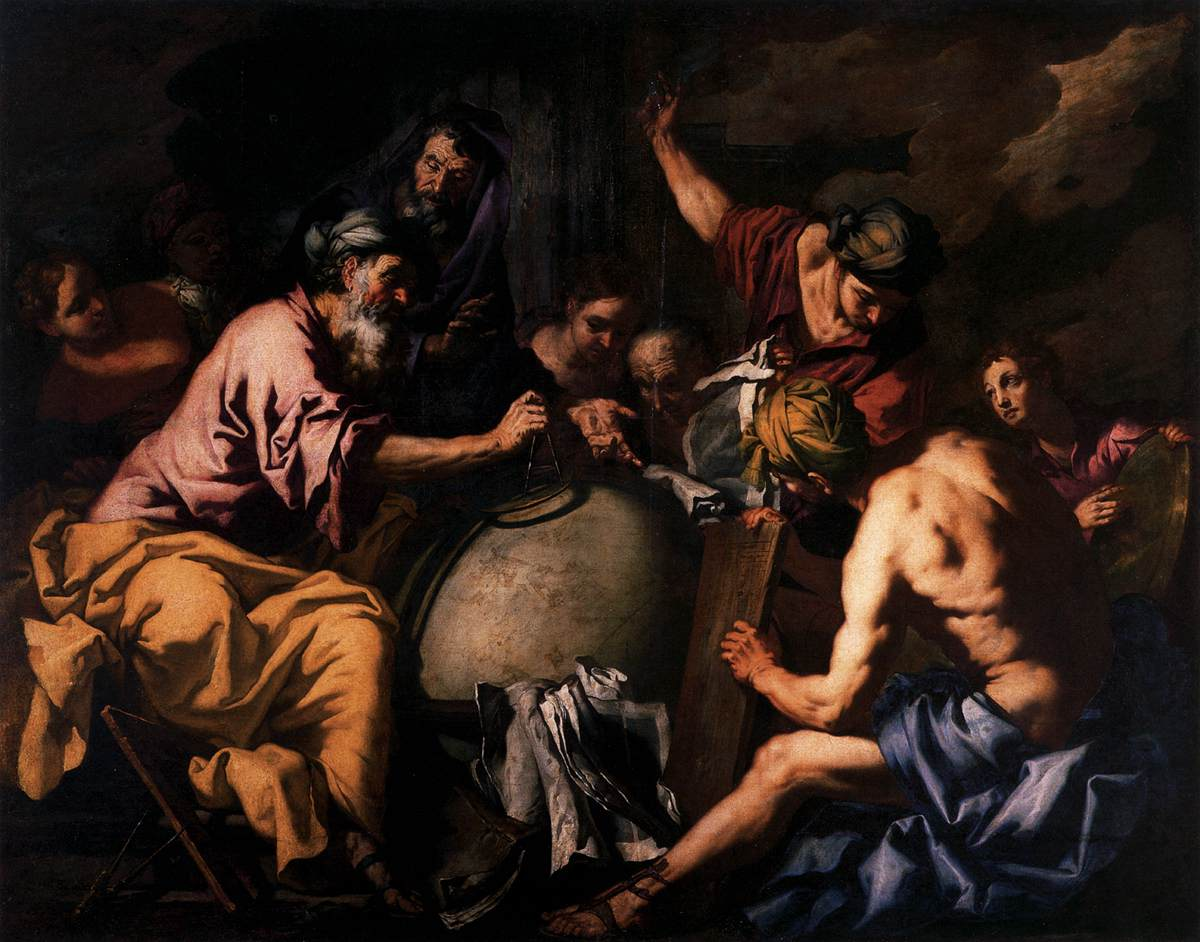
Abraham teaches astrology to the Egyptians

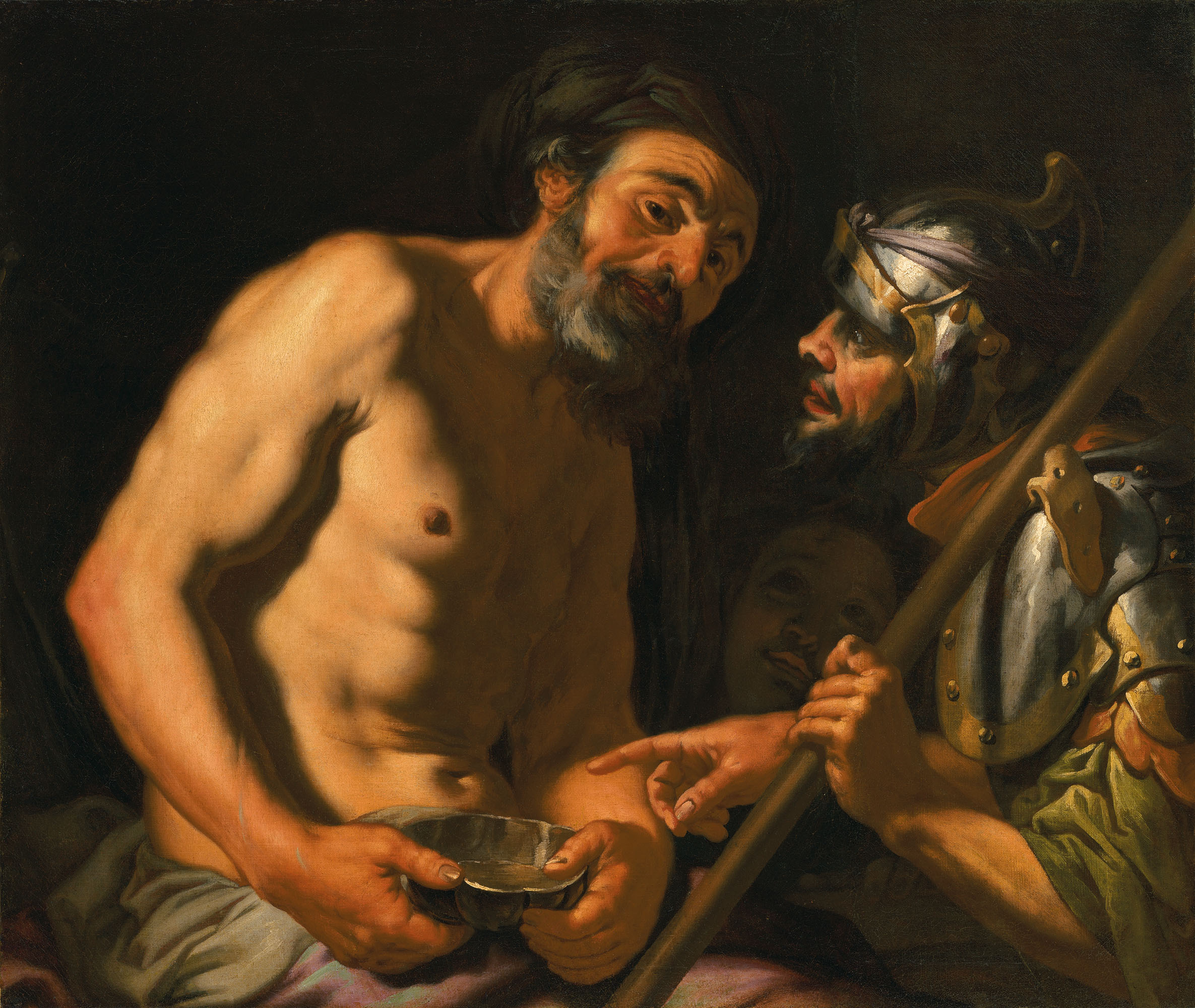
The Death of Socrates

== Bibliography ==
- Farquhar, Maria (1855). Ralph Nicholson Wornum (ed.). Biographical catalogue of the principal Italian painters. London: Woodfall & Kinder. p. 204.
- Pietrogrande, Giacomo (1881). Biografie Estensi. Tipografia alla Minerva dei Fratelli Salmin, Padua. pp. 71–92.
- Giuseppe Pacciarotti, La Pintura Barroca en Italia (Baroque Paintings in Italy) (2000), Istmo, p. 275, ISBN 84-7090-376-4, página 275.
