= I Gesuiti, Venice =

Chiesa di Santa Maria Assunta detta I Gesuiti
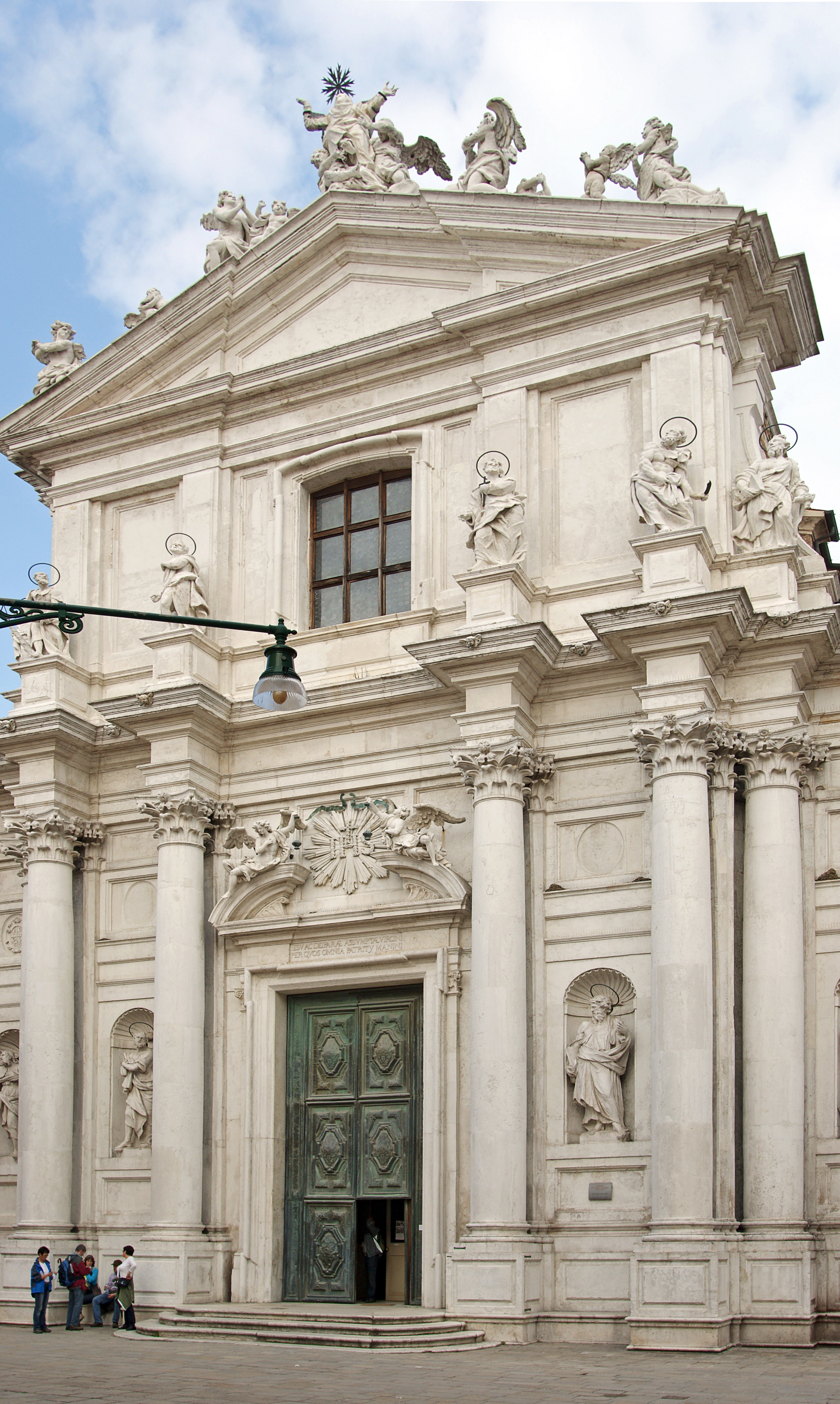
- Facade of the church
- Chiesa di Santa Maria Assunta detta I Gesuiti
- 45°26′36″N 12°20′21″E
- Location: Venice, Veneto
- Country: Italy
- Denomination: Catholicism

History
- Consecrated: 1728

Architecture
- Groundbreaking: 1715
- Completed: 1729

Administration
- Diocese: Patriarch of Venice

The church of Santa Maria Assunta, known as I Gesuiti, is a religious building in Venice, Italy. It is located in the sestiere of Cannaregio, in Campo dei Gesuiti, not far from the Fondamenta Nuove.

== History ==
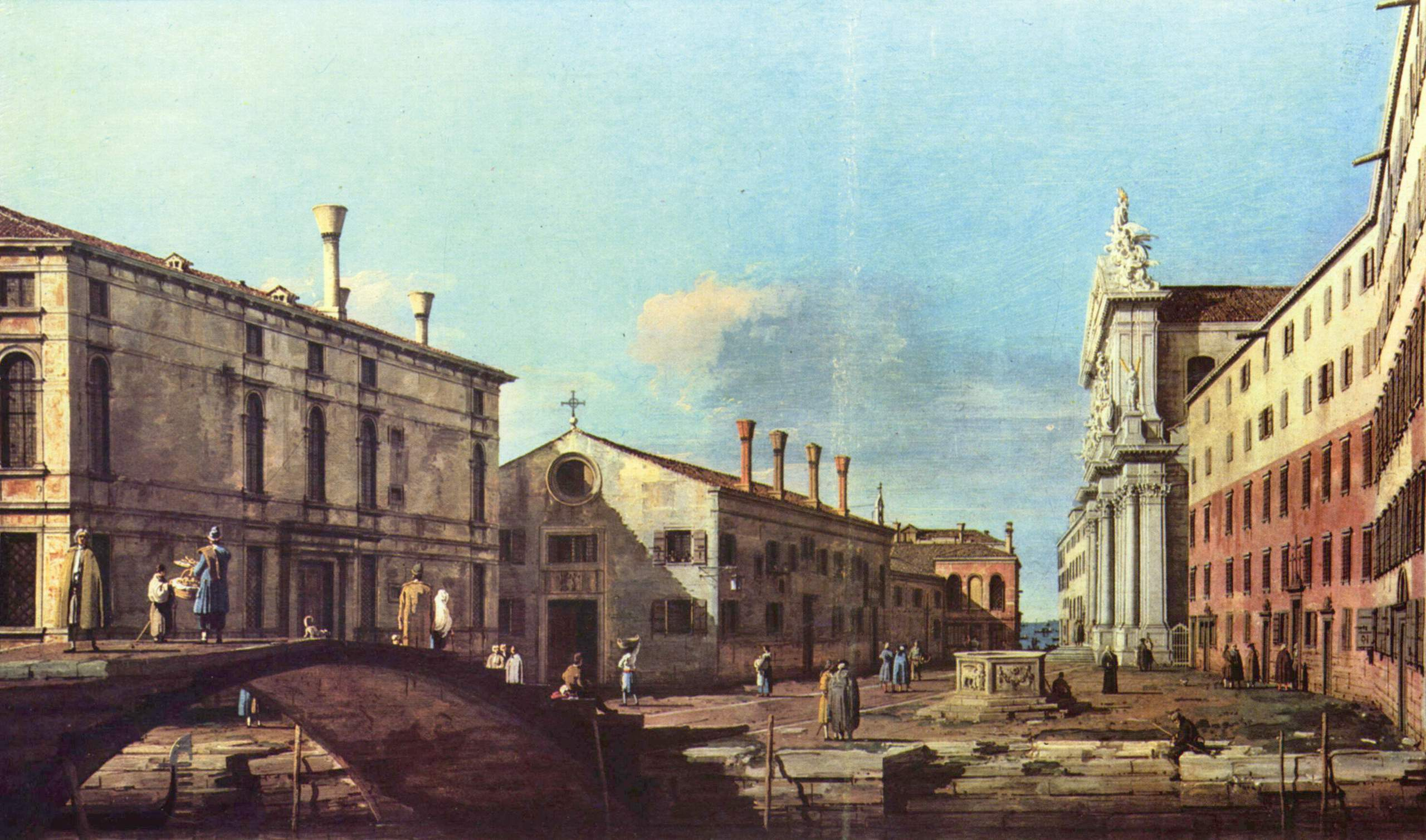
The Campo and Church, by Canaletto

According to some sources (Note: Giangiacopo Fontana, Illustrazione storico critica della Chiesa di Santa Sofia del 1836) the construction of the original church was financed by a certain Pietro or, according to Doge Andrea Dandolo, by Cleto Gussoni in 1148 and was surrounded by grounds, bodies of water and wetlands. In 1154 Cleto turned it into a hospital for the poor who were ill, both men and women. Another Gussoni, by the name of Buonavere, relative and heir of Cleto, ultimately provided vineyards and some of his other estates in the districts of Chioggia and Pellestrina. In the monastery of I Gesuiti a member of the same family, Marco Gussoni, took his vows, miraculously cured by the then Blessed, later Saint Luigi Gonzaga. It is said that in 1601 Marco, struck down by a grave illness, was healed instantly on the invocation by the saint. However, on 1 August 1631 he contracted the plague and died in Ferrara whilst working to help the plague victims there; he became known as "uomo di somma pietà" (man of supreme mercy). A portrait of him entitled Marco Gussoni blessing the plague victims at the Lazzaretto of Ferrara (Note: Marco Gussoni che benedice gli appestati nel Lazzaretto di Ferrara (1664)) is exhibited in Ca' Rezzonico.

Saint Ignatius of Loyola visited the city of Venice for the first time in 1523 to embark on a pilgrimage to Jerusalem. He returned to Venice in 1535 with a group of friends, who already called themselves the Society of Jesus (members of which are referred to as Jesuits - Gesuiti in Italian), and here they were ordained as priests. It took just two years for the group to fully establish themselves in the Lagoon of Venice and to gain a large following. They left for Rome in 1537.

In 1606, due to the quarrels between Pope Paul V and Venice, the city was placed under interdiction, (Note: Interdiction involved a ban on performing religious rites) and as a consequence, the Jesuits were exiled until 1657. During these years, Venice was involved in a consuming war with the Ottoman Empire and Pope Alexander VIII decided to provide the services of the Betlemitani, an order created to assist the Knights of the Cross who were under the control of this pope.

Venice then sold the whole estate to the Jesuits, including a church, a hospital and a convent, for fifty-thousand ducats. However, the Betlemitani church was not large enough for the Jesuits. So in 1715 they knocked it down and built their own temple. The church was given the name of Santa Maria Assunta (Mary after Assumption). It was financed by the Manin family; an aristocratic Friulan family from 1651. The church was consecrated in 1728.

== Description ==
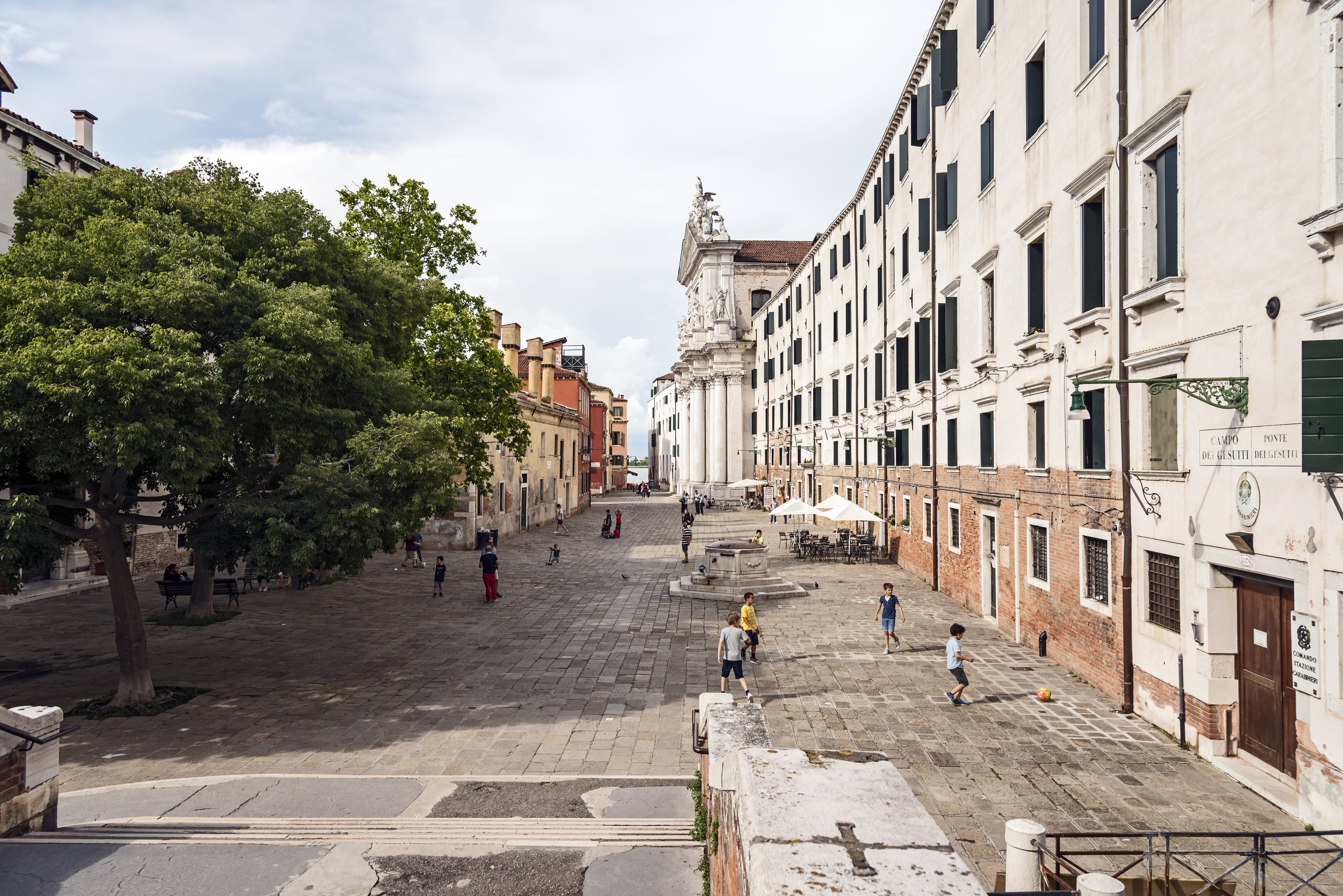
View of the "Complex of Gesuiti"

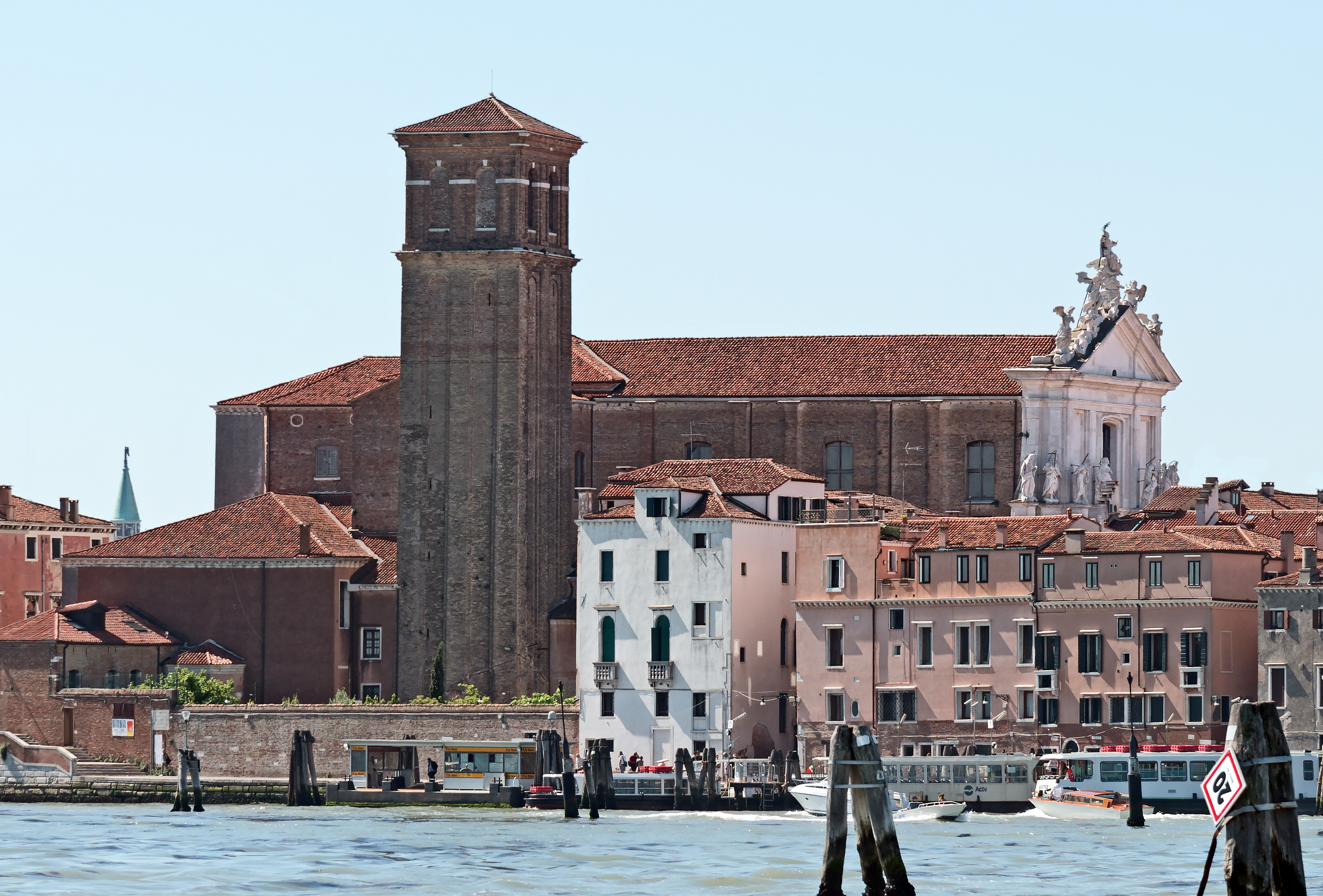
View from lagoon

The Jesuits in Venice determined that Domenico Rossi, who designed the Church of San Stae, was the ideal architect to do the work they needed. It was not an easy task for him as he had to follow strict plans, which were defined for the Jesuits by the Council of Trent.

The facade is in two tiers: the lower of which is formed around eight columns, on which rests the rough and cracked architrave of the second tier. The columns support eight statues, which, along with four others in various niches, represent the "twelve apostles". Four other statues on the sides of the main entrance represent Saint James the Greater, Saint Peter, Saint Paul and Saint Matthew the Evangelist. Among the sculptors is Filippo Catasio and Giuseppe Ziminiani. Lining the Tympanum are statues by Giuseppe Torretti, forming his work L'Assunzione della Vergine Maria (The Assumption of the Virgin Mary). In recent times some work of Francesco Bonazza has been lost. A green and white marble banner, positioned in front of the central window.

The layout of the church is typical of Jesuit churches, in the form of a Latin cross with three chapels in the longest wing. The transept and chancel are alongside two other chapels. The six chapels on the sides of the nave are separated by small rooms which were probably once used for confession. Between the second and third chapels stands the remarkable pulpit created by Francesco Bonazza and along the entire corridor there are "corretti", grates that visitors to the convent could look through. The nave of the church pales in comparison to the altar, which is dedicated to the Holy Trinity, due to the presence of four pillars which support the cross vault. These pillars were decorated with green and white marble between 1725 and 1731. The campanile is almost entirely the original that was erected for the church of the Betlemitani, the only addition is the belfry from the eighteenth century.

The ceiling is adorned with frescoes. In the chancel, Angel musicians in Glory (1720), and on the vaulted ceiling The Triumph of the Name of Jesus (1732), were painted by Ludovico Dorigny. On the ceiling of the nave, Abraham and Three Angels and Vision of St John Evangelist were painted by Francesco Fontebasso in 1734. The chancel is decorated with statues of cherubs, little angels, angels and archangels by Giuseppe Torretti. Around the altar, designed by the Jesuit father Giuseppe Pozzo, ten columns support a green and white dome. A chapel in the church has the monument to Doge Cicogna by Campagna.

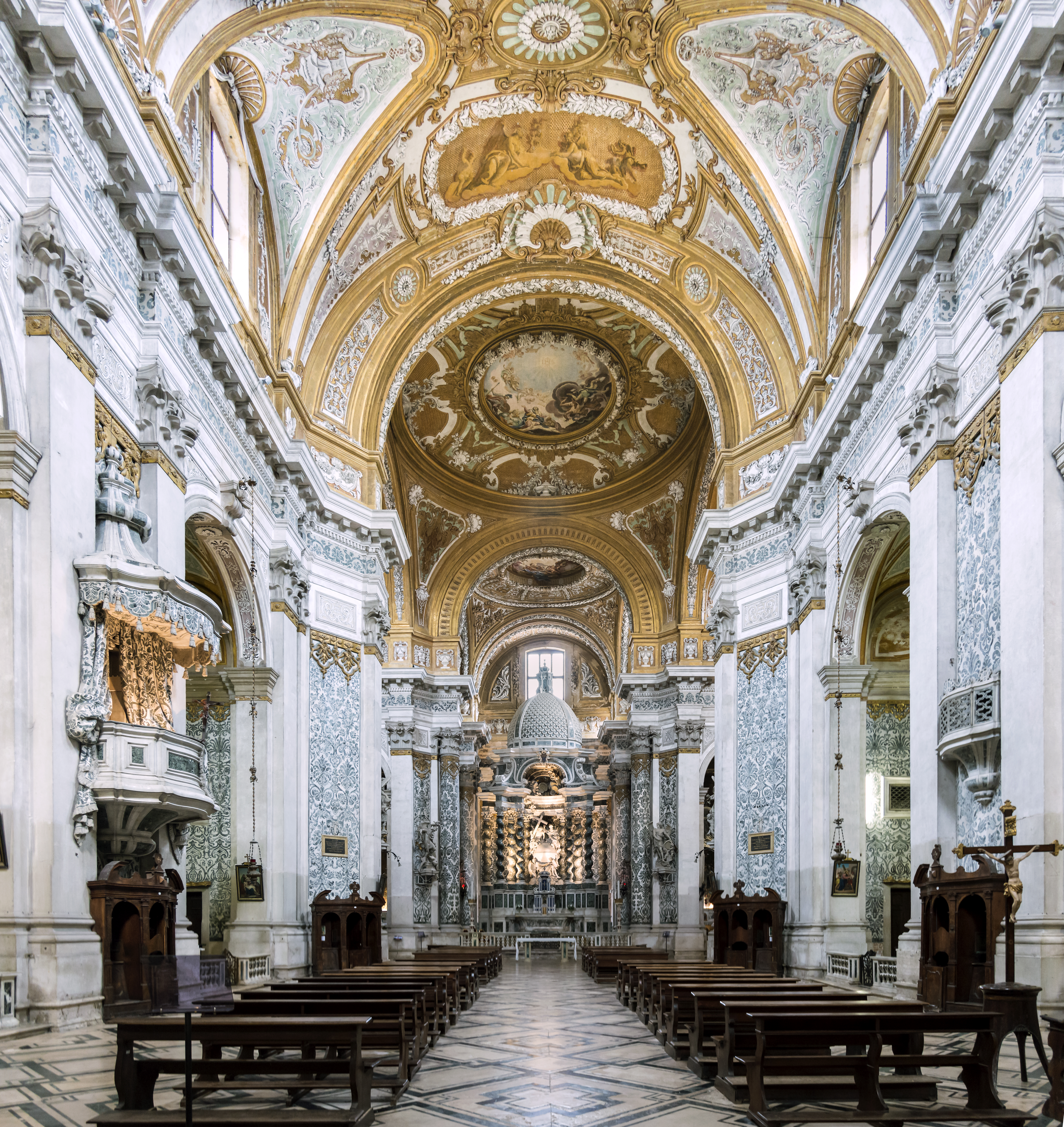
The nave

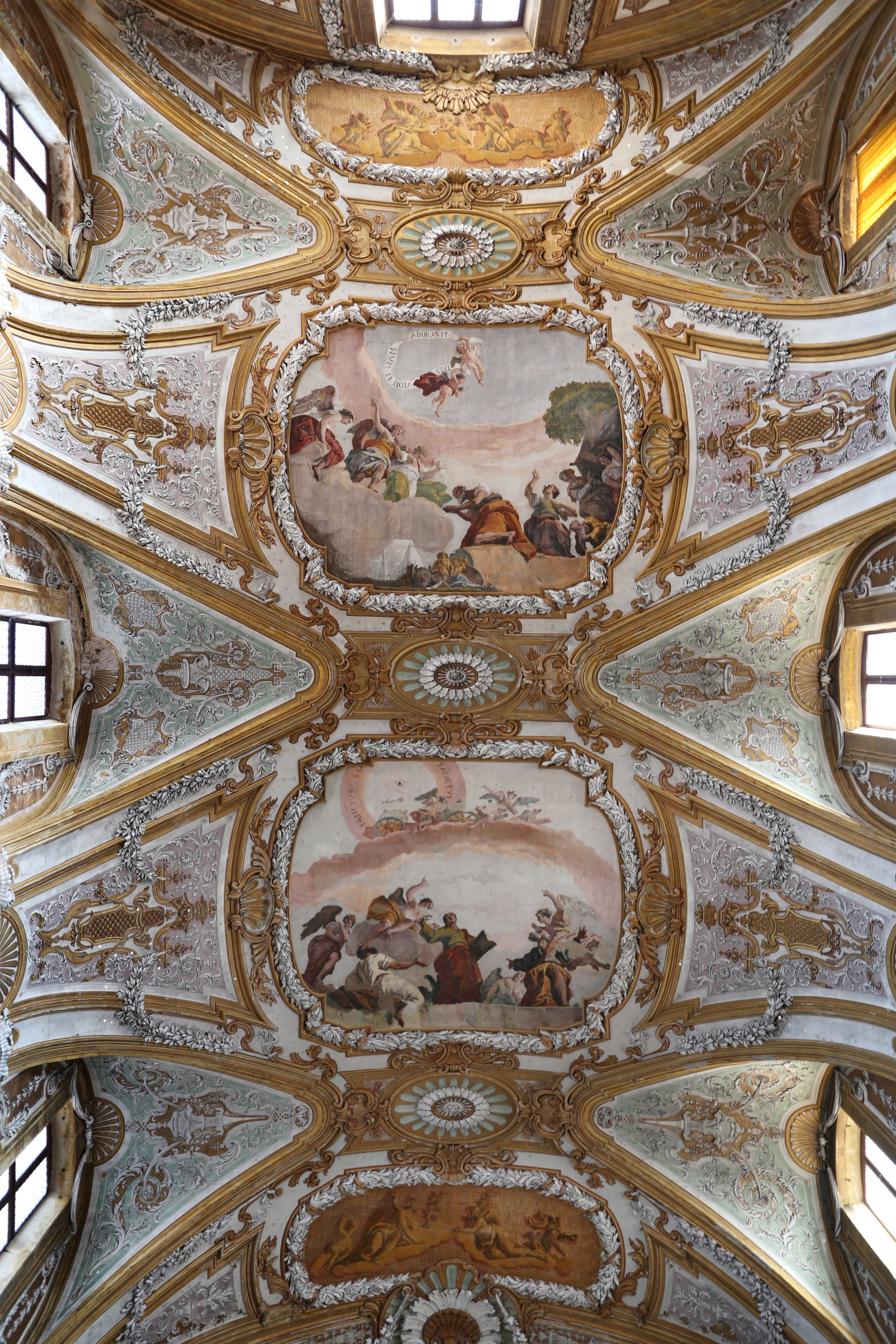
The ceiling

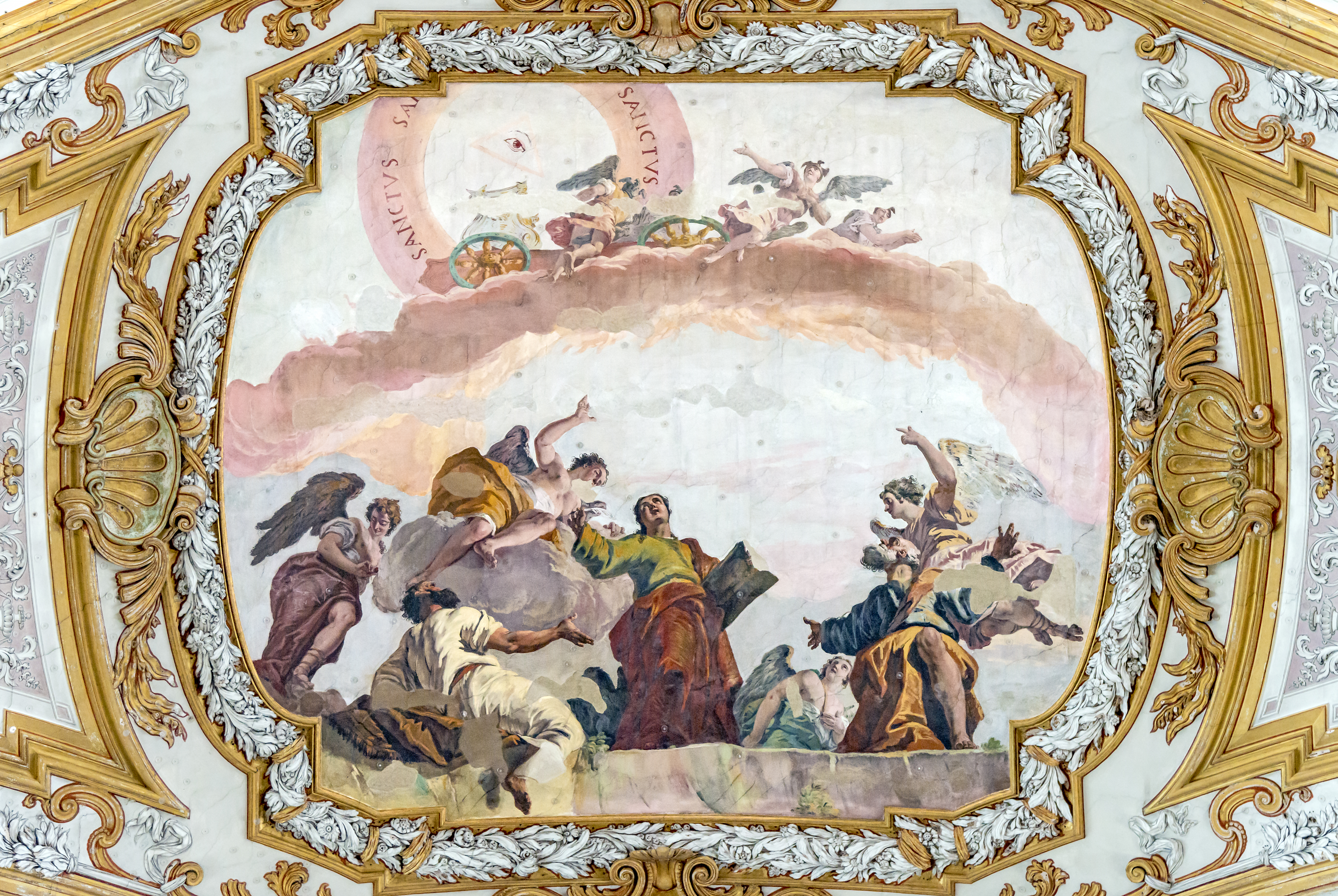
Vision of St John Evangelist by Francesco Fontebasso

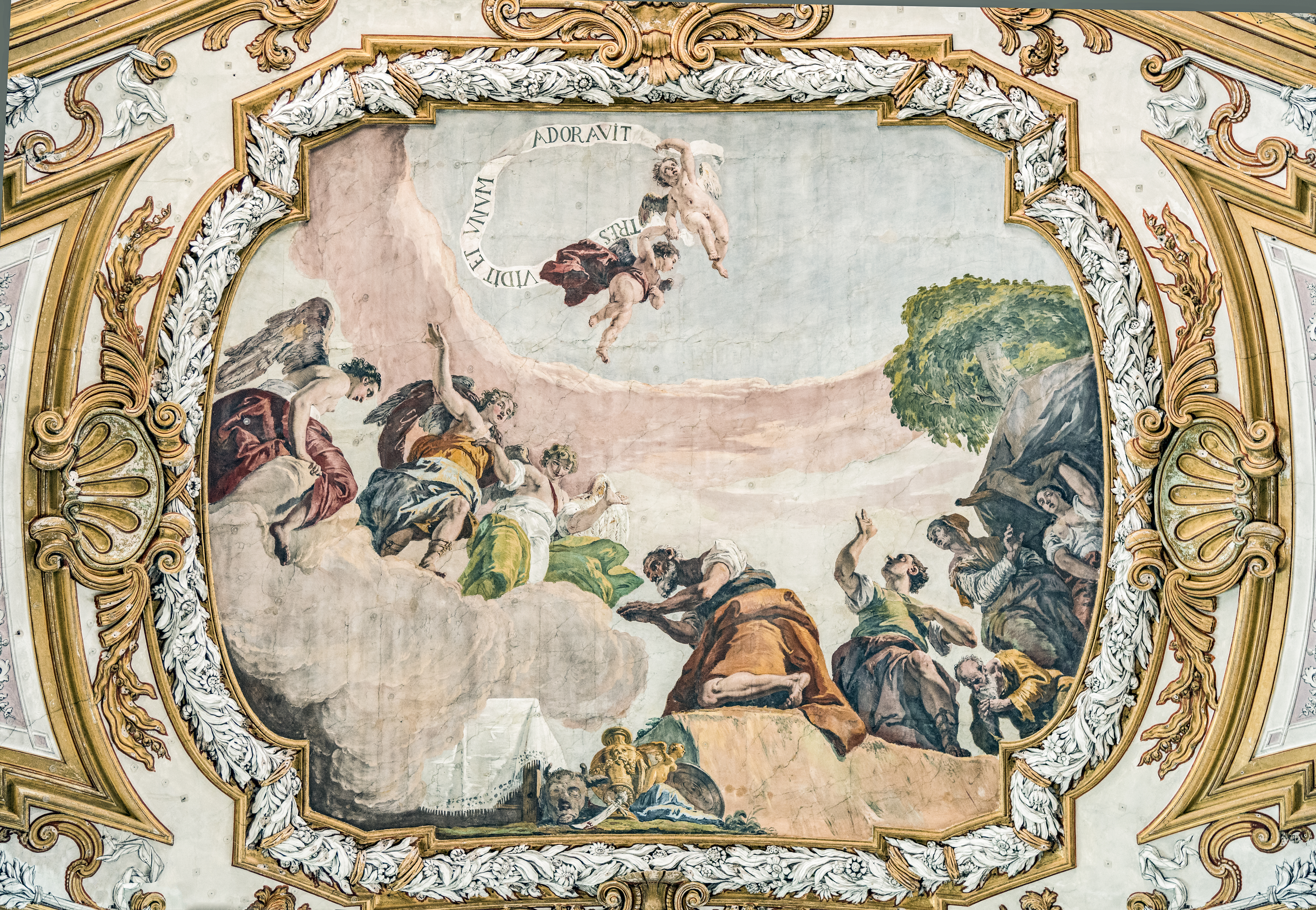
Abraham and Three Angels by Francesco Fontebasso

=== Counter-façade ===
The funeral monument of the Da Lezze family by Jacopo Sansovino (mid-16th century). This monument already existed in the ancient church of Crosechieri and was rebuilt by the Jesuits on the site of origin. It is the result of two orders, respectively 4 and 8 columns, on the busts of the sarcophagi of: Priam De Lezze (center, bust of Alessandro Vittoria), Andrea De Lezze (on the left, Giulio del Moro) and Giovanni Da Lezze (on the right, also deGiulio del Moro). It is chronologically the first example of a monument erected to celebrate a patrician family in Venice.

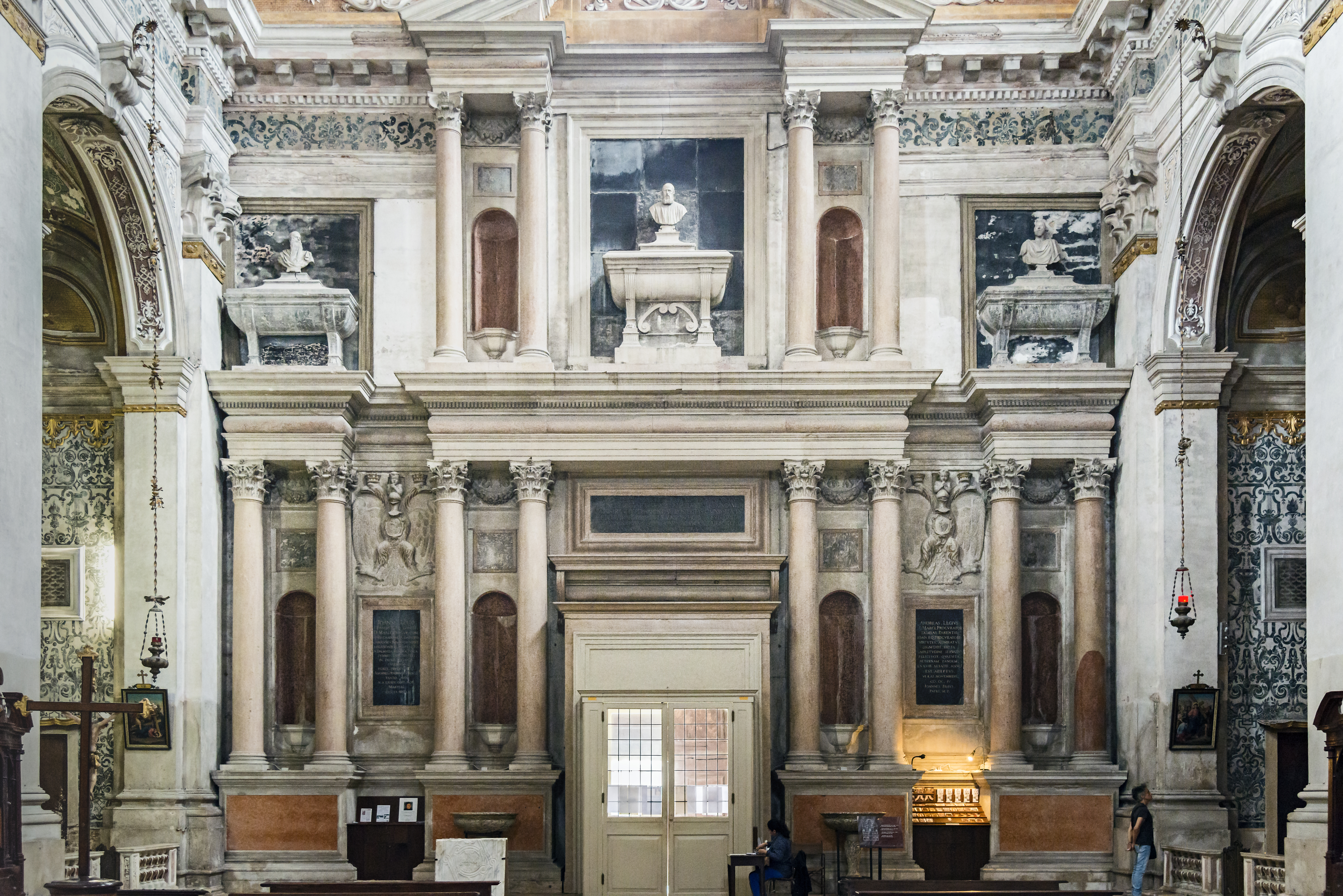
Monument from Da Lezze family to Jacopo Sanvovino

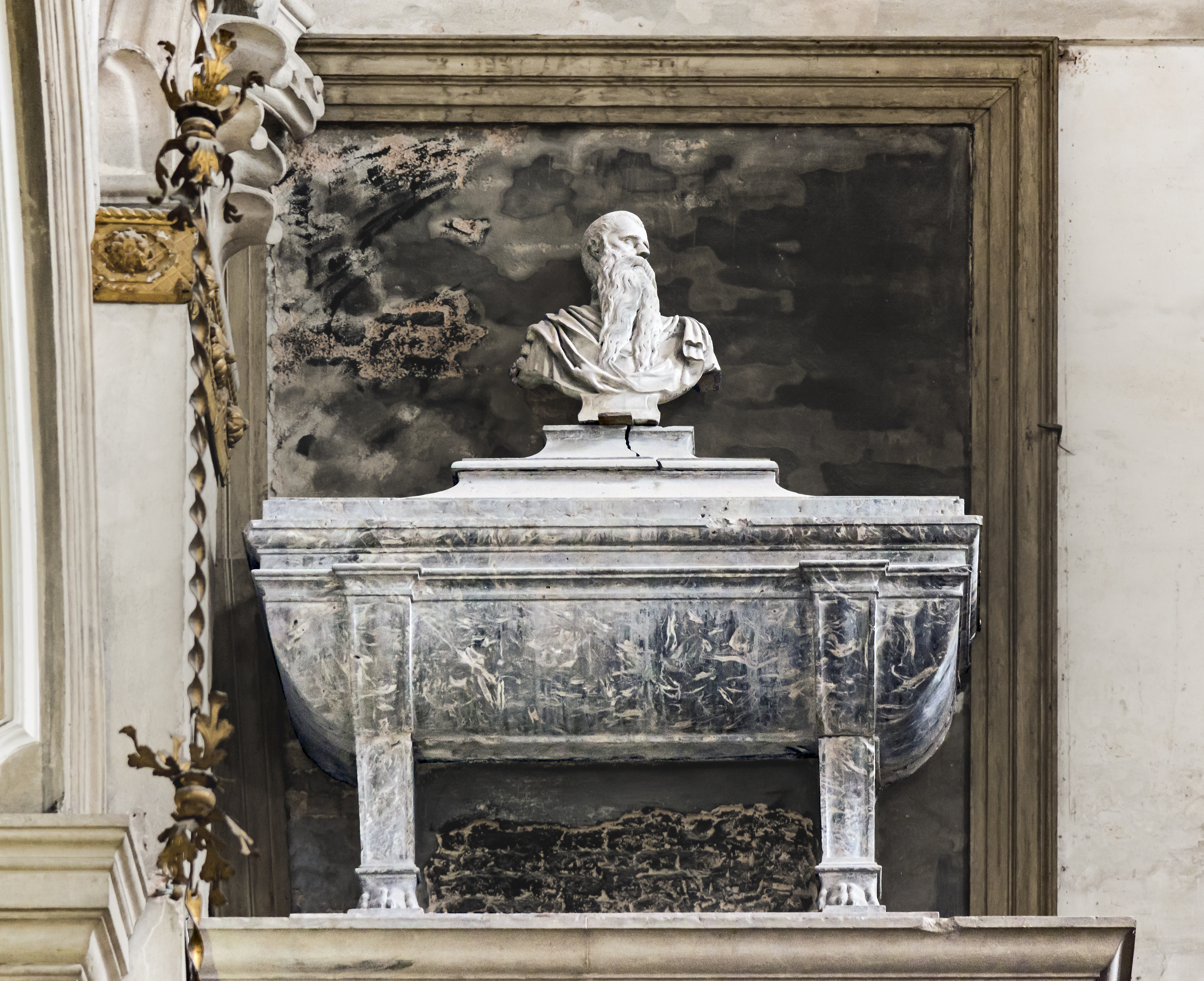
Monument to Giovanni Da Lezze

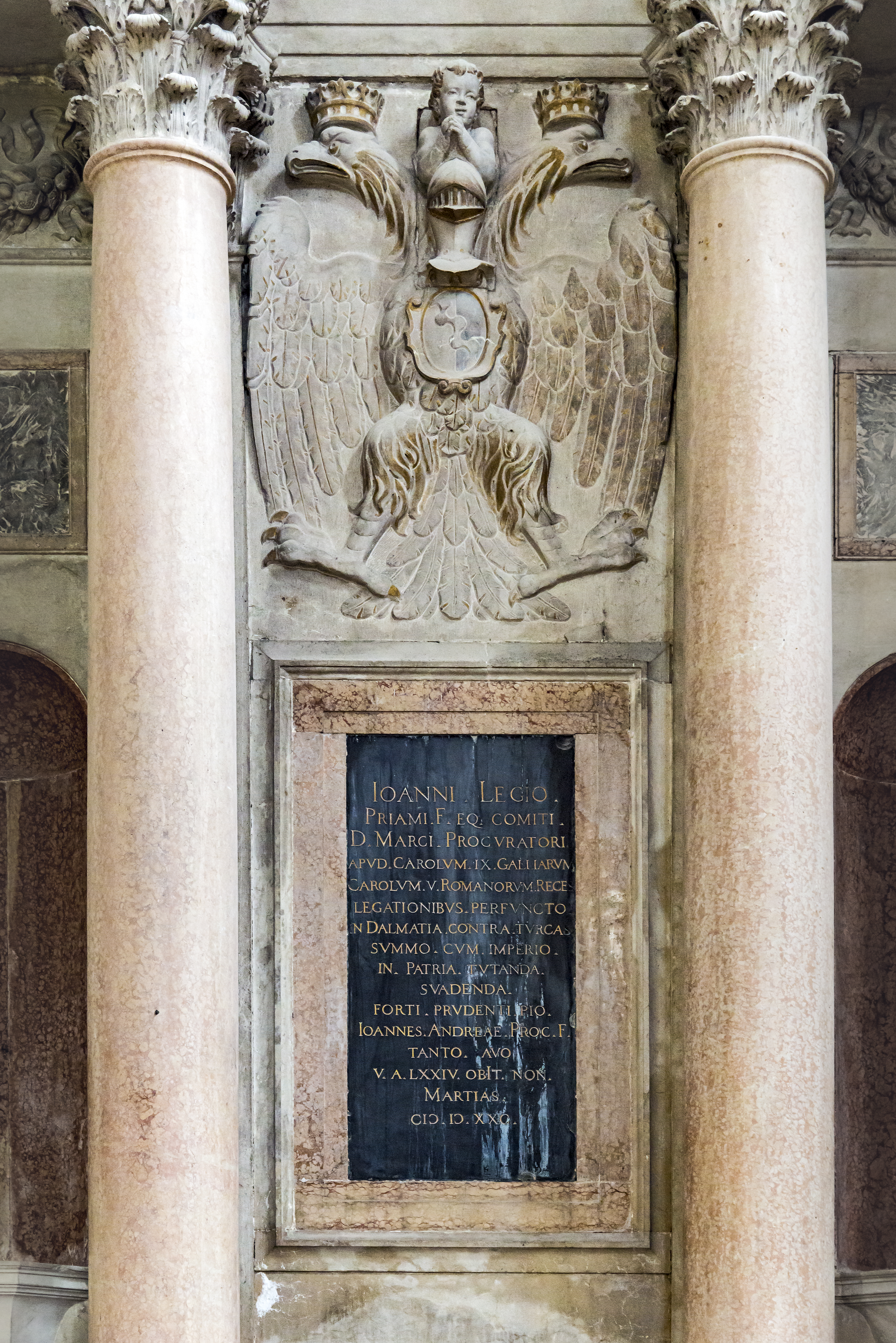
Epitaph from Giovanni Da Lezze

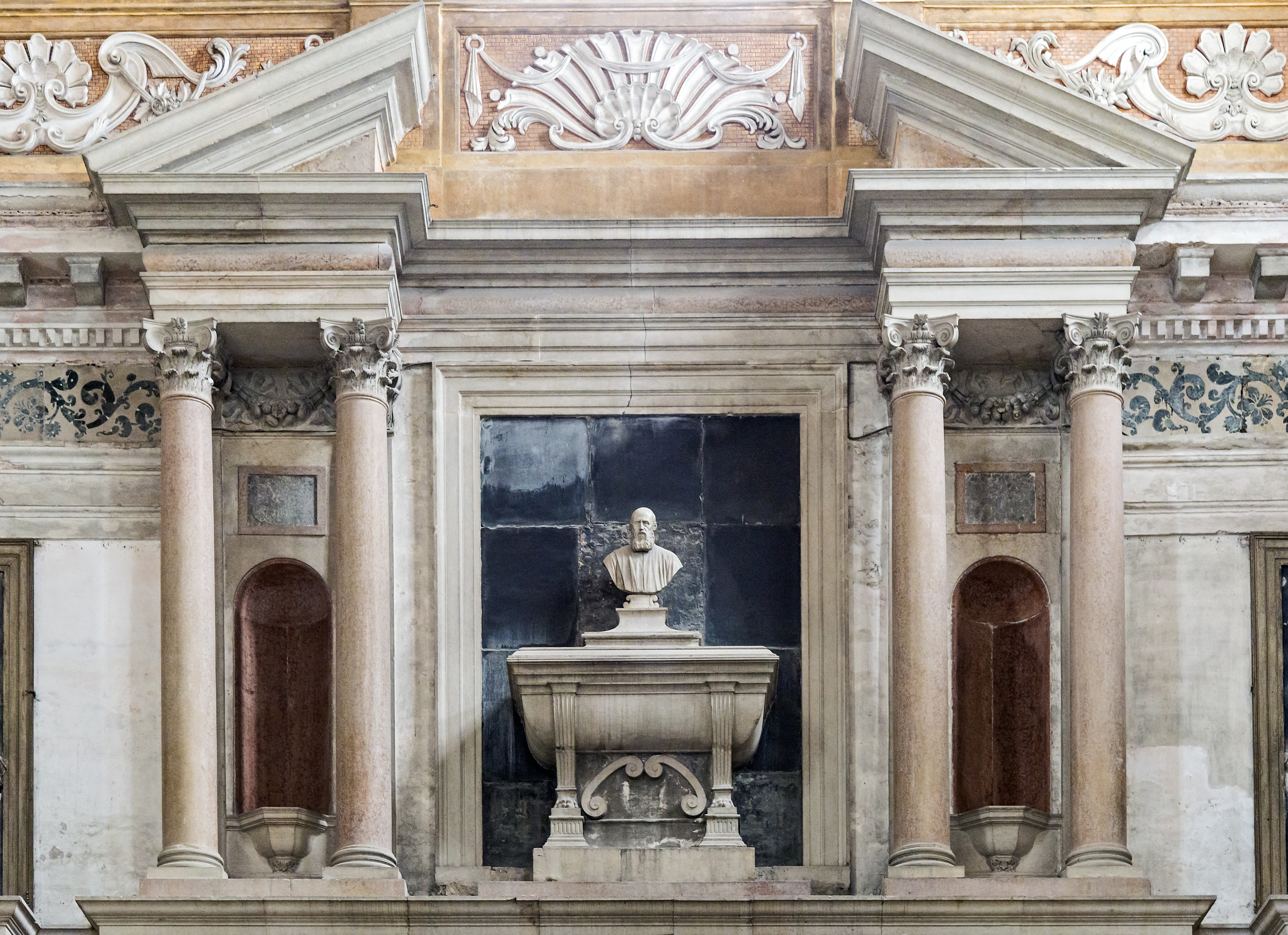
Monument to Priamo Da Lezze

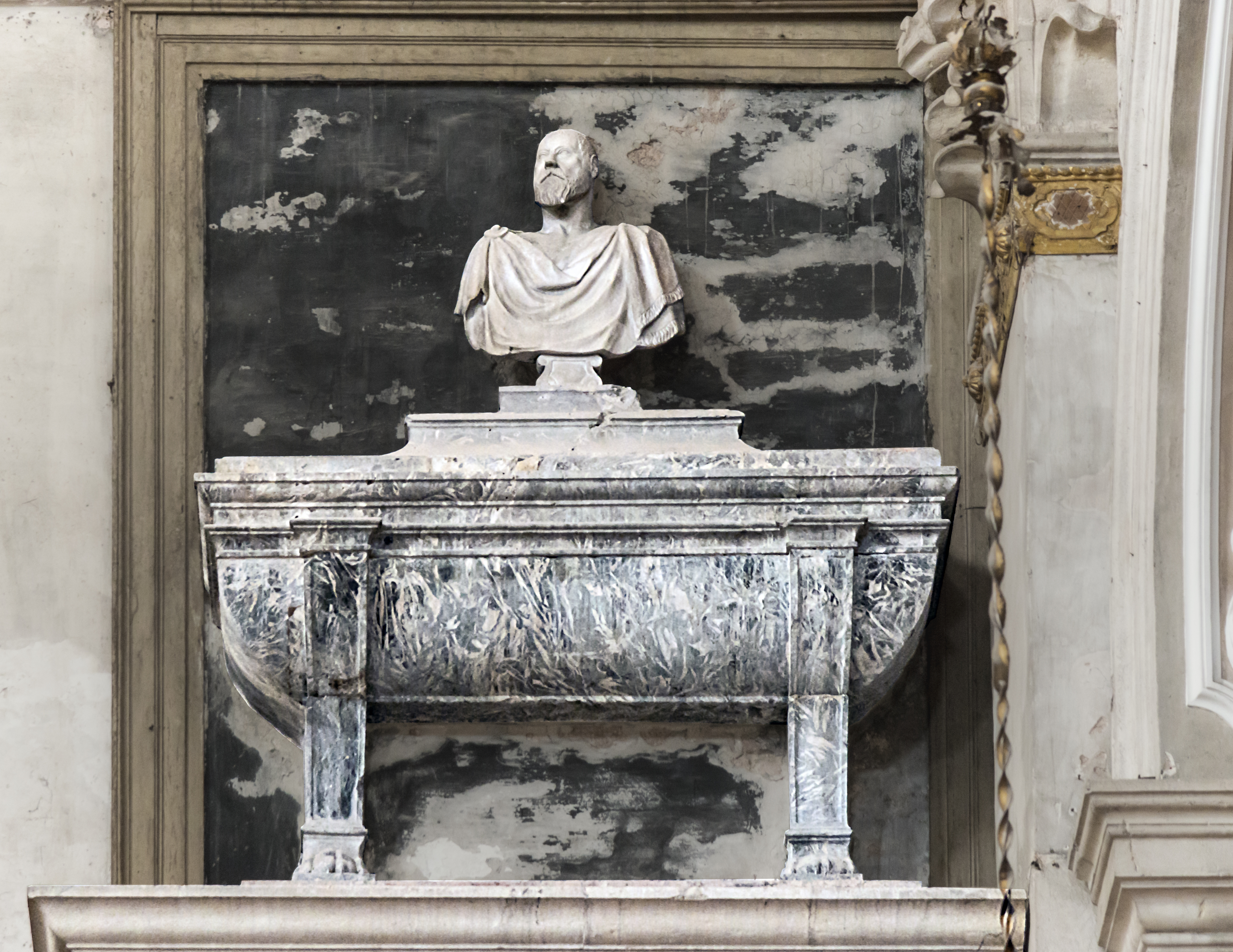
Monument to Andrea Da Lezze

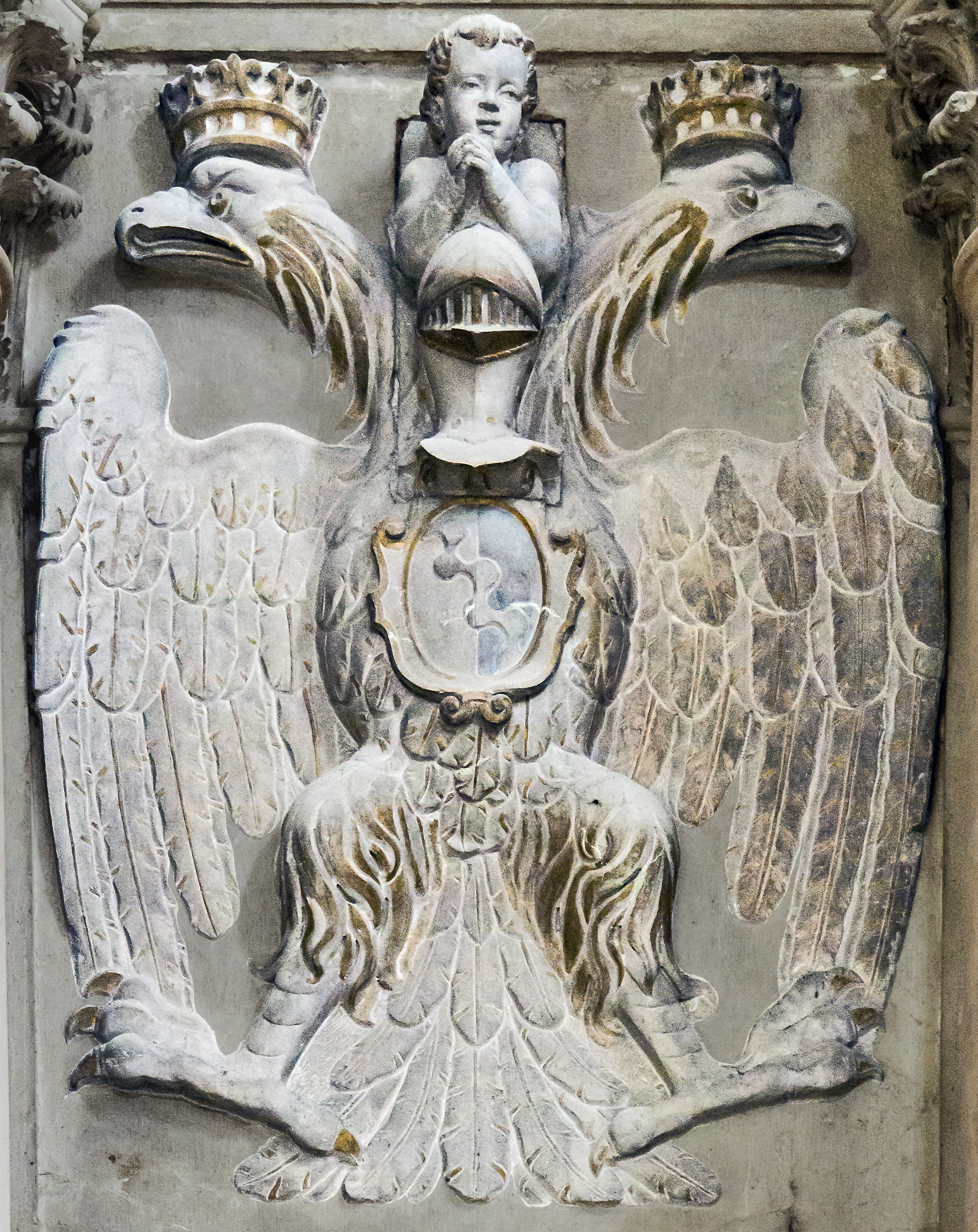
Cost arms of Da Lezze

=== The left side of the nave ===
First Chapel - Chapel of Saint Lawrence
The chapel is known for the table of the altarpiece: The Martyrdom of Saint Lawrence masterpiece of Titian (1588). The painting belonged initially to the old church of Crosechieri.

The altar was used by the schola dei passamaneri.

Second chapel - Chapel of Our Lady.
The chapel is located in the ancient walls of the same site: the "chapel of the Virgin" of the old church of Crosechieri. On the altar the statue of the Virgin and Child (before 1604), the only vestige of the previous chapel, is the sculptor Andrea dall'Acquila.
The pulpit
Between the second and the third chapel is the beautiful chair of Francesco Bonazza.
The third chapel - The Chapel of the Sacred Heart
The chapel belonged to the schola de devozion of the Imacolata Concezio, as shown by the inscription placed on the base of the columns. The seat of the 'schola' is always visible on the campo in front of the church. The picture of the altarpiece: "Sacred Heart of Jesus" is a copy of Alessandro Revera (second half of the 19th century) from the original of Pompeo Batoni.

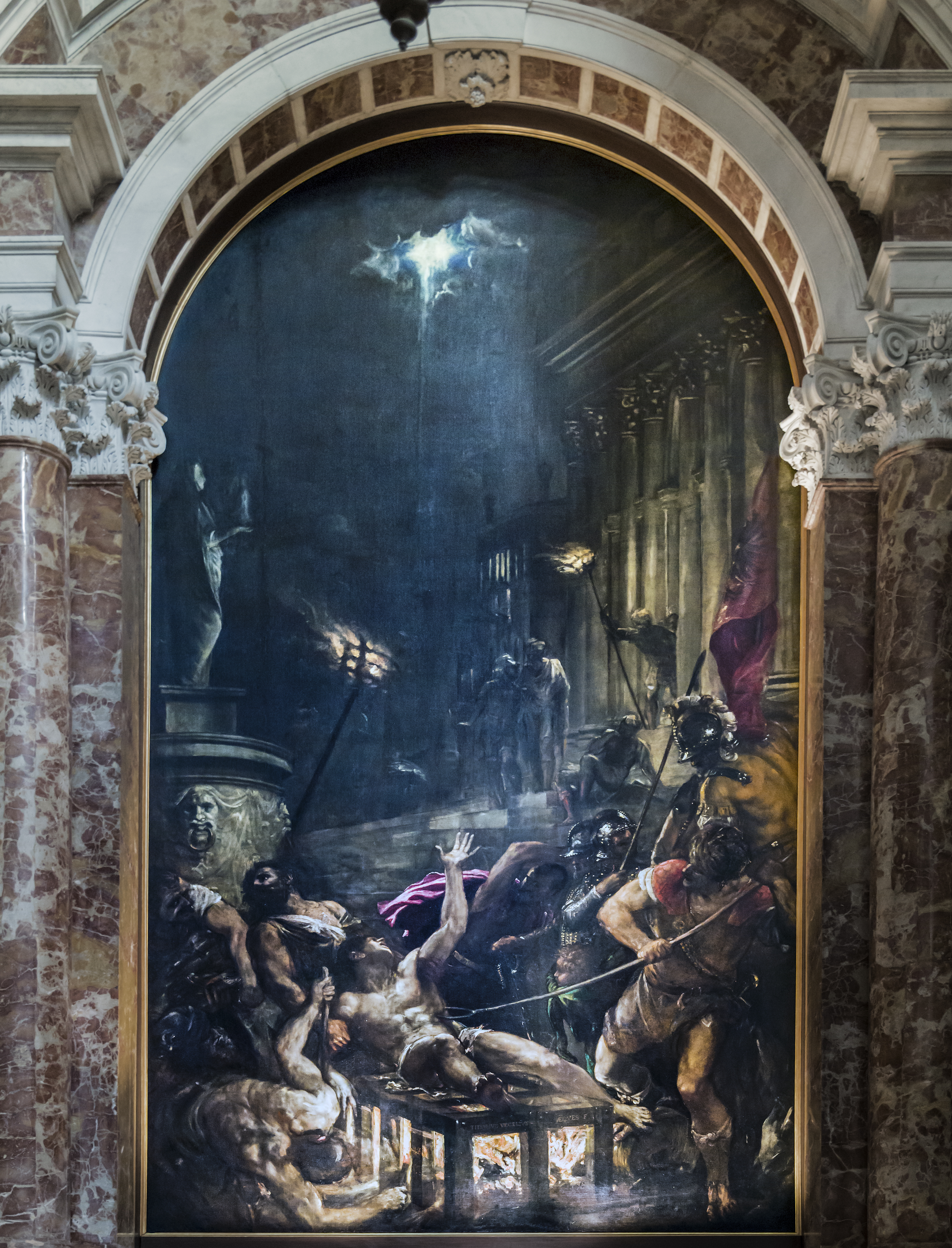
The Martyrdom of St Lawrence - Titian

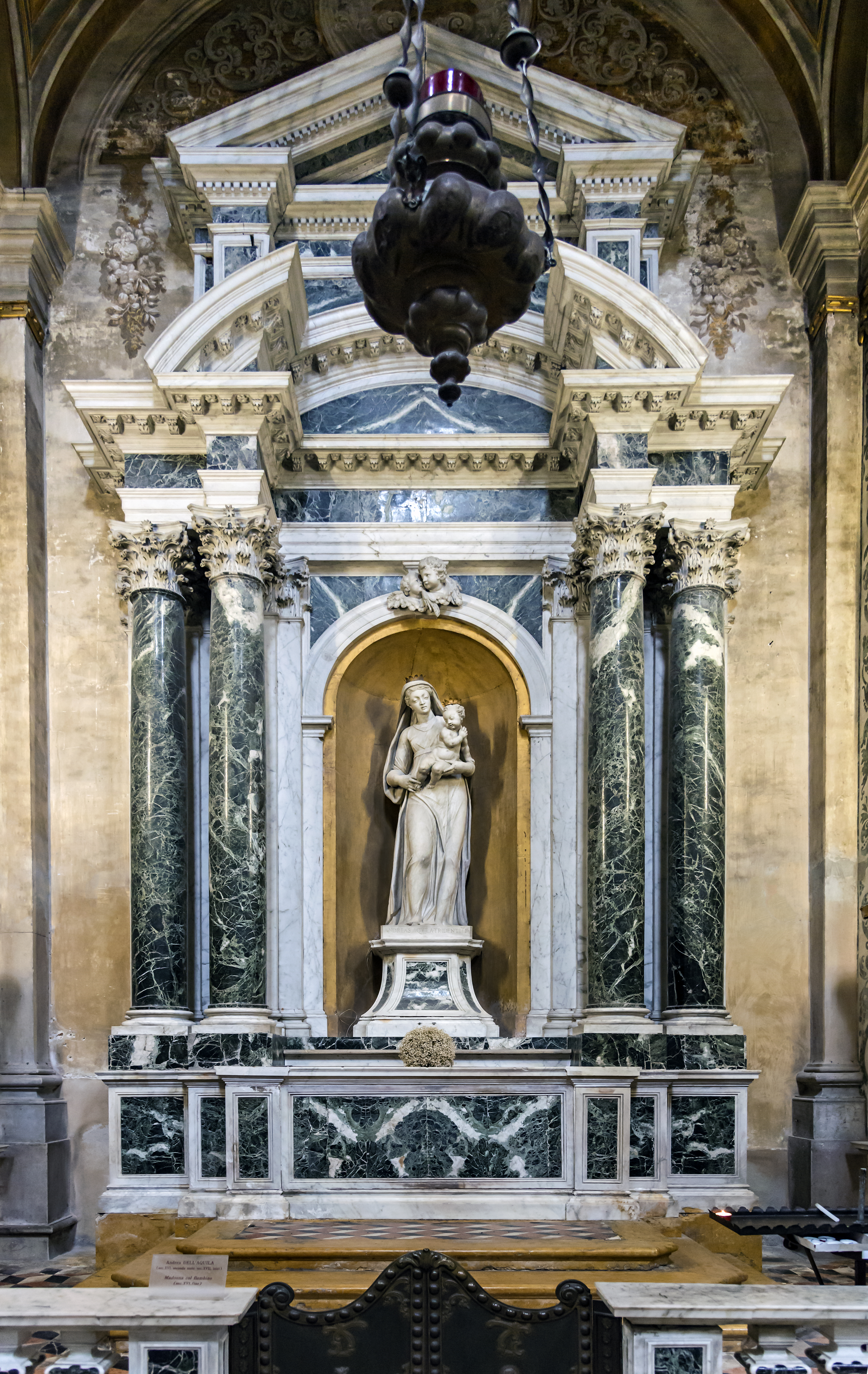
Chapel of Our Lady

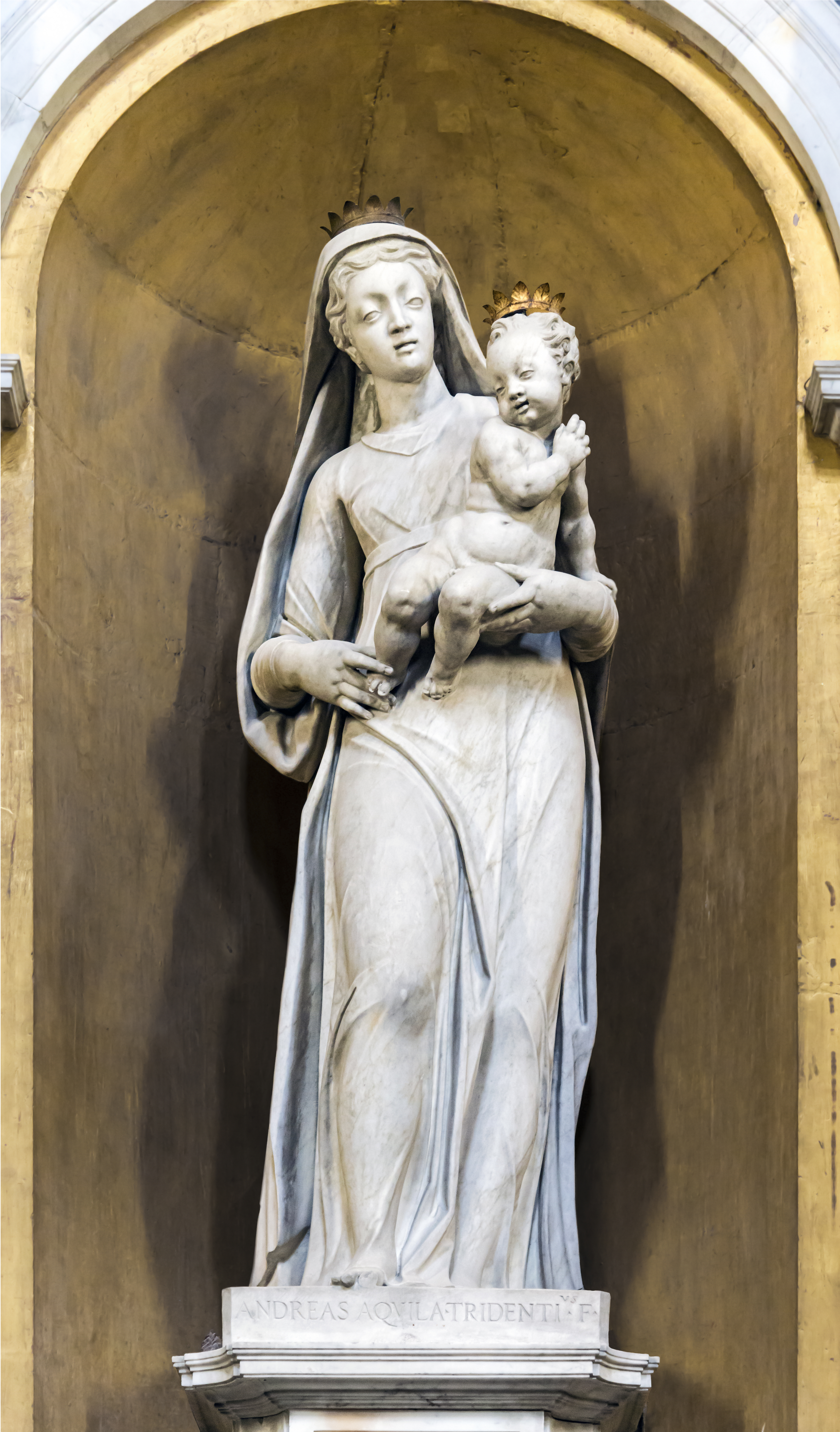
Virgin and Child by Andrea Dell'Aquila

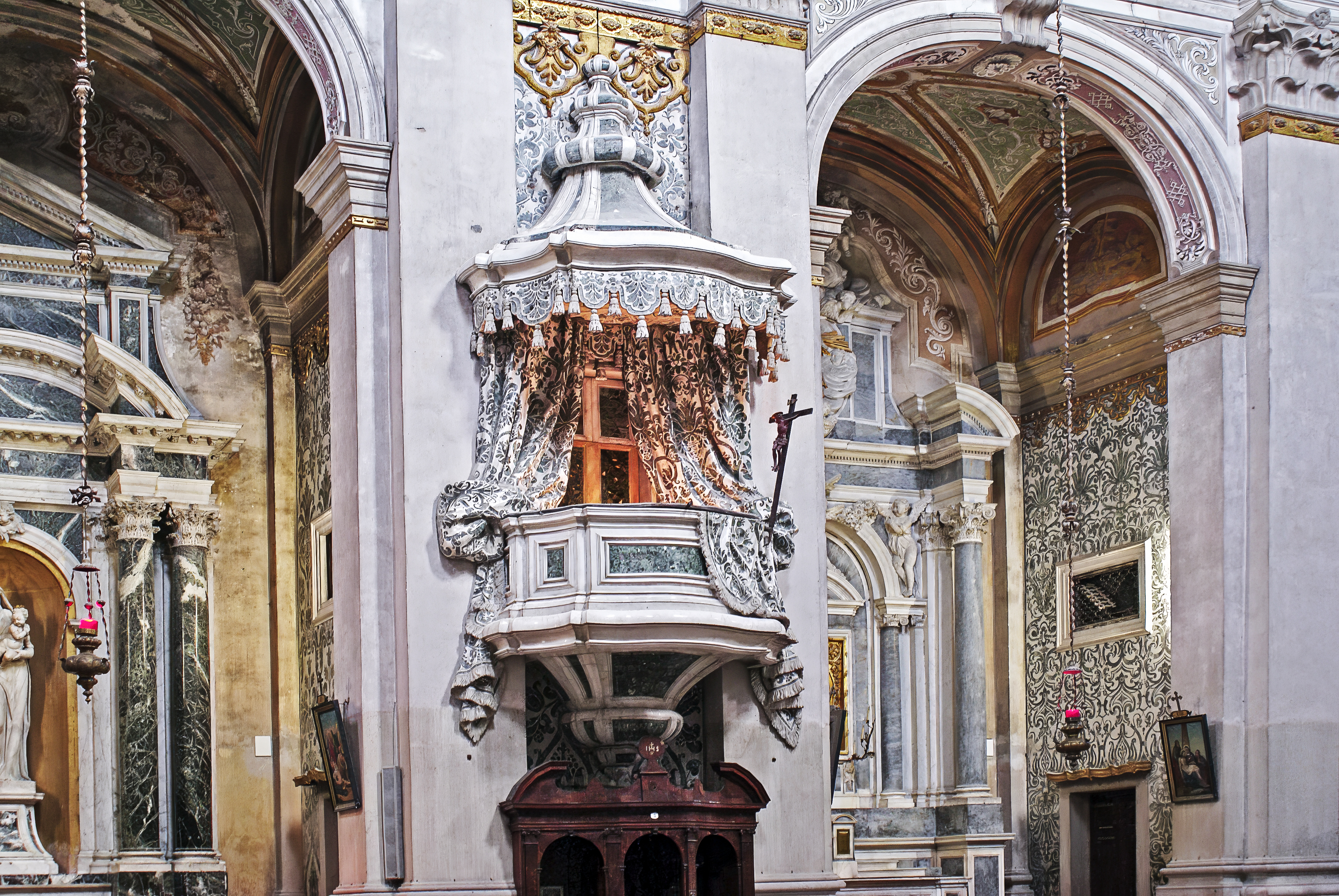
Pulpit

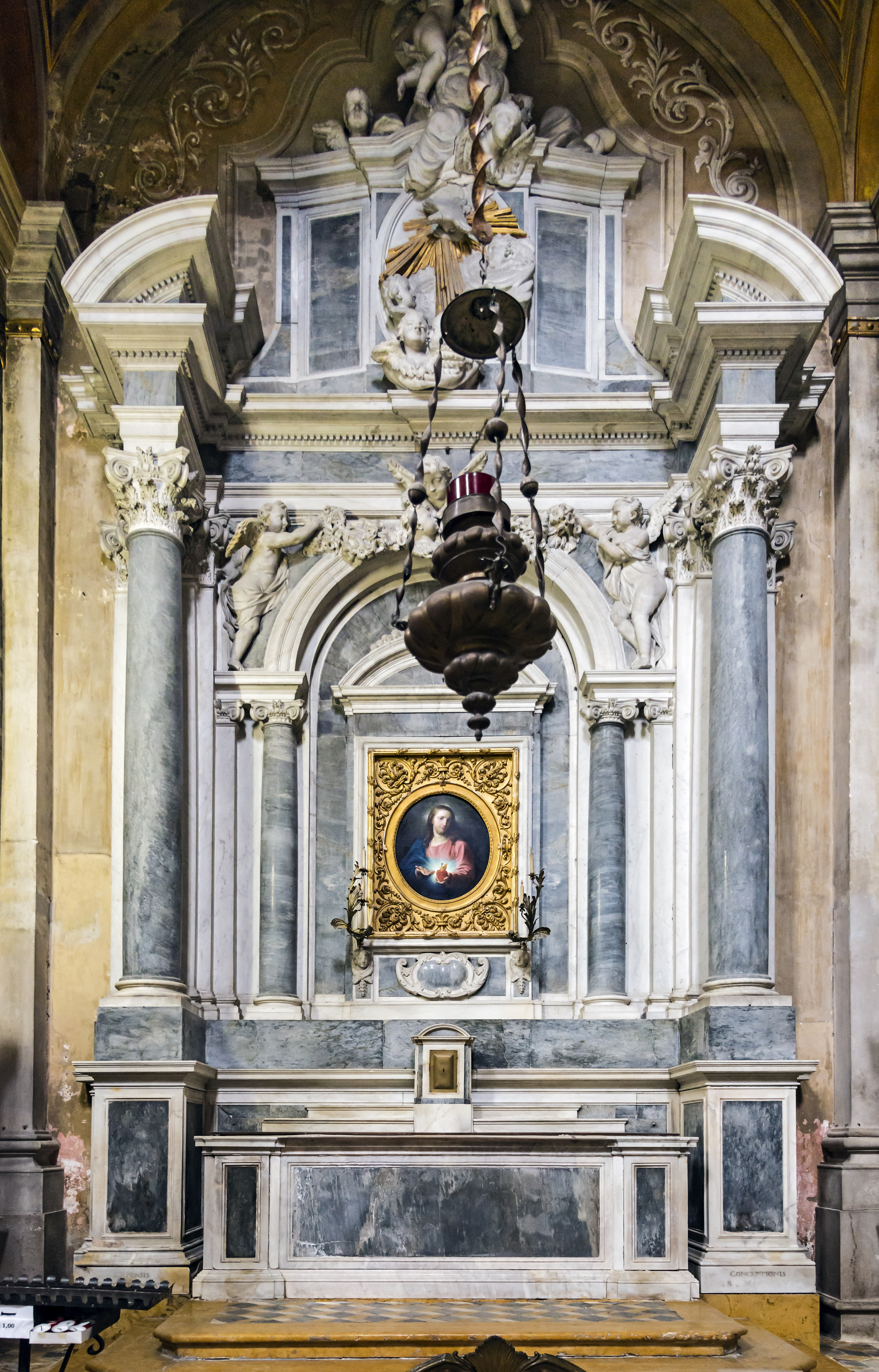
The Chapel of the Sacred Heart

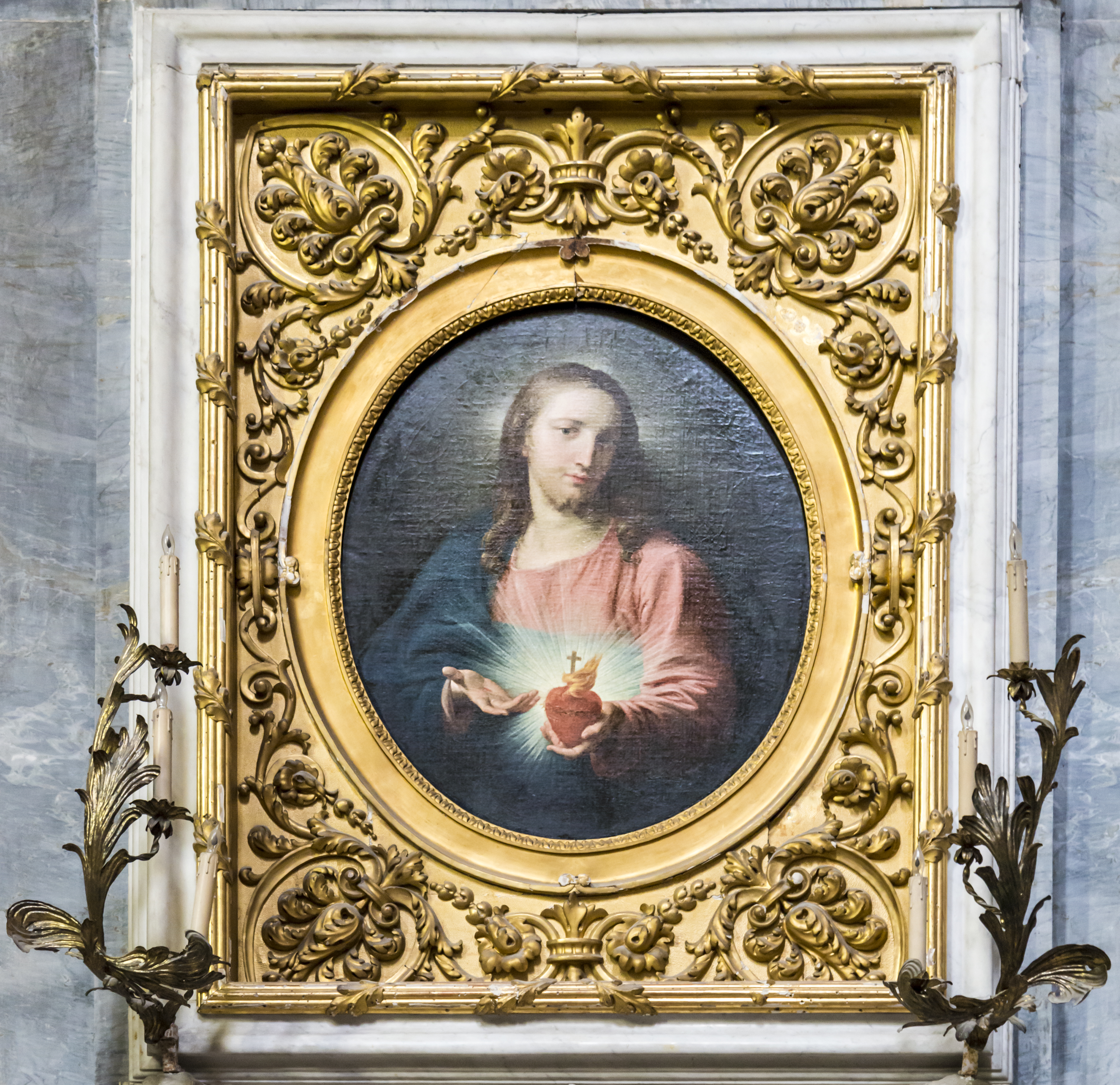
The Sacred Heart by Pompeo Batoni

=== The left transept ===
The organ

Altar of the Assumption of Mary
Constructed from 1723 to 1724 by Giuseppe Pozzo on behalf of Paolo Querini, procurator of San Marco. Initially the site was reserved to the Jesuit Francesco Saverio altar, opposite the altar of the founder Ignace in the right transept. The sculptures of the pediment are, Giuseppe Torretti, and represent Modesty, and Virginity and cherubs.
The painting of the altarpiece Assumption of Mary is a work of the Tintoretto, 1555. Originally commissioned at Veronese, it originates from the destroyed church of the Crociferi where it was on the high altar. In the picture the arms of the Crosechieri are placed in the center of the marble tomb.
The Funeral Monument of the Doge Pasquale Cicogna
Framing the door of the sacristy, there is the funeral monument of the Doge Pasquale Cicogna (1585-1595), it is due Girolamo Campaign and dates from the early 1600s. The doge was particularly close to Crosechieri, of which he was the boss munificence Of their hospital, and had expressed the desire to be buried in their church. The inscriptions on the monument recalling the war of Candia (Crete), the plague in Padua, the famine for the Republic. He commemorates an incident of 1653 when he saved with his hands the slice blessed by the priest, removed by a gust of wind.

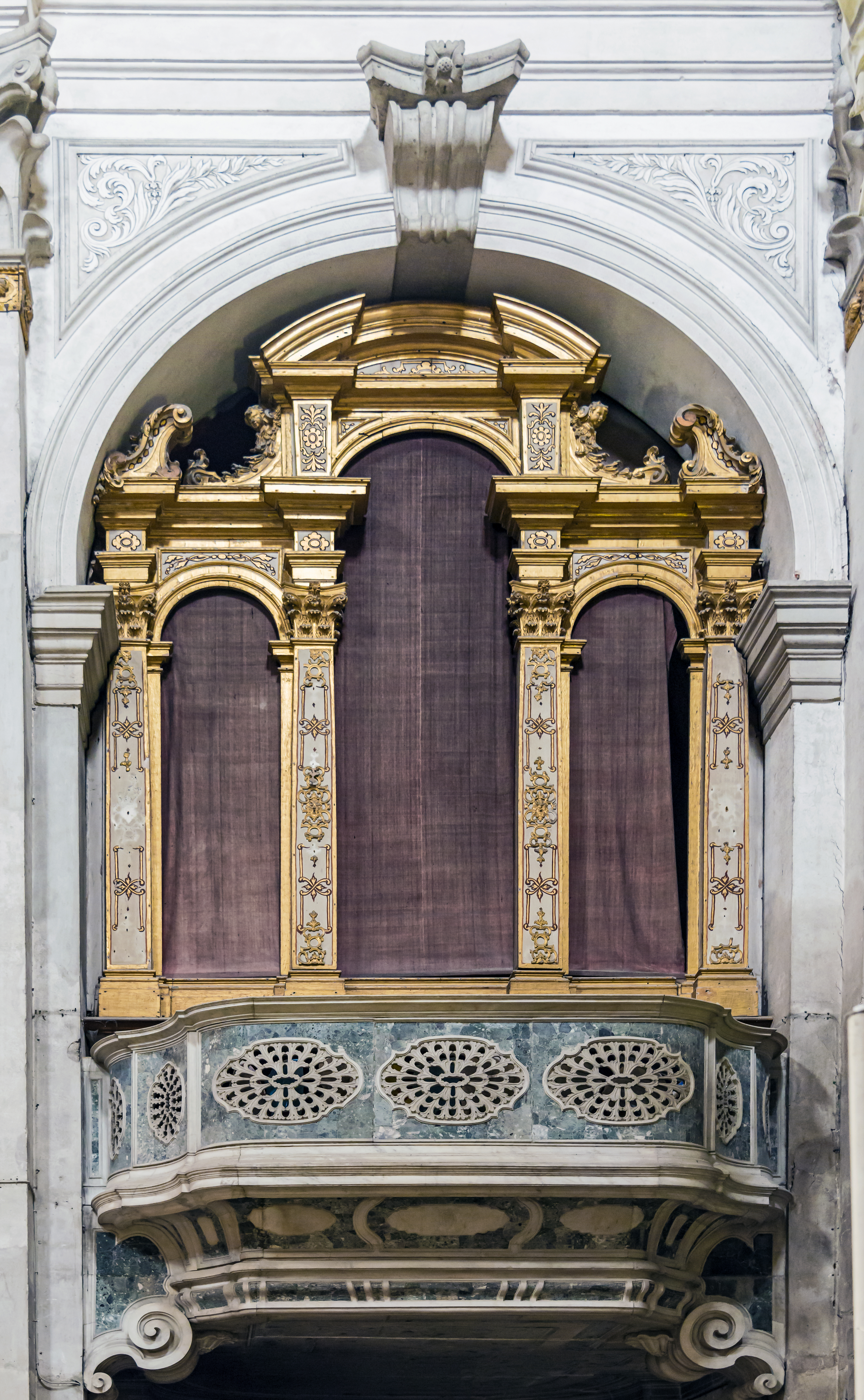
The left organ

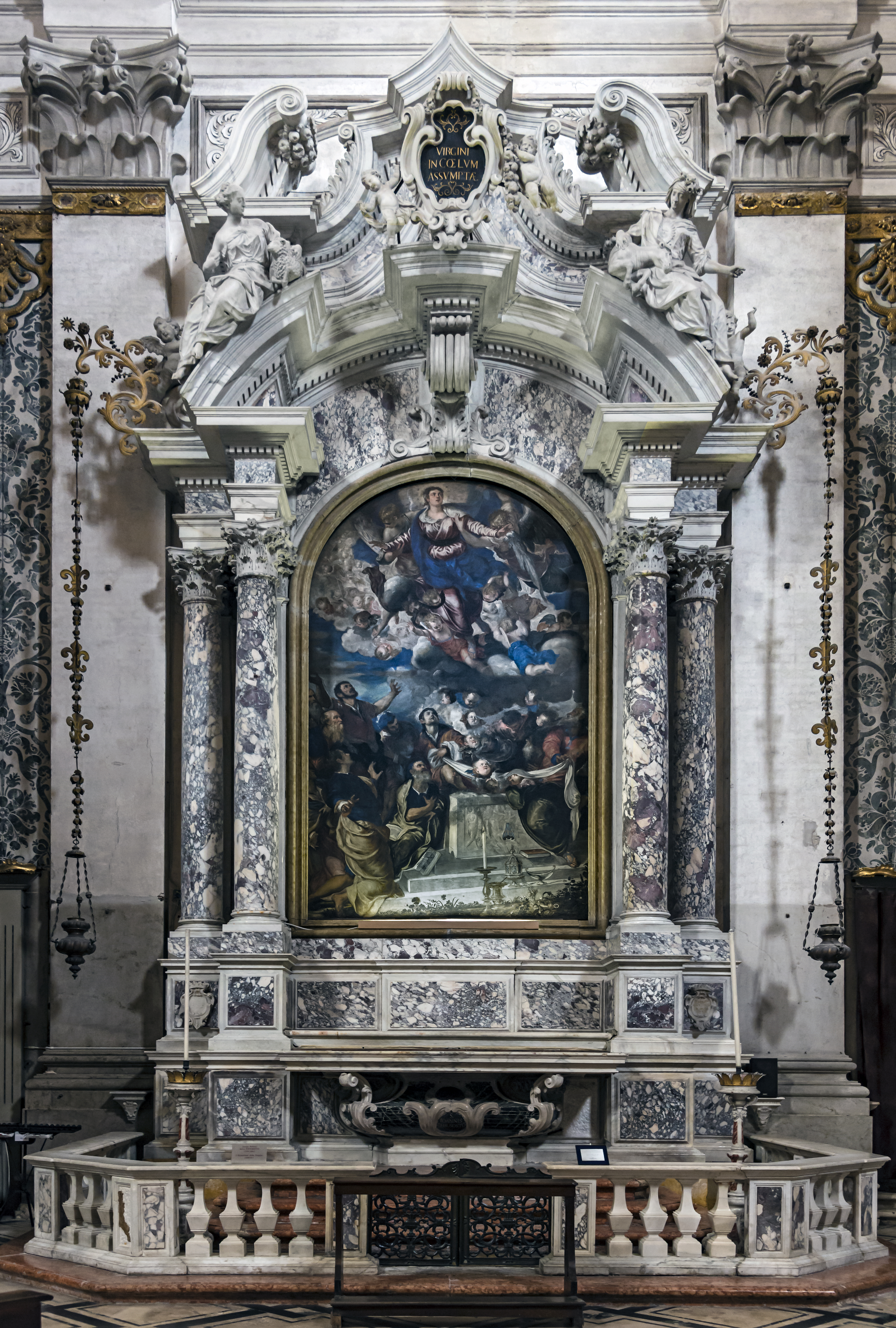
Altar of the Assumption of Mary

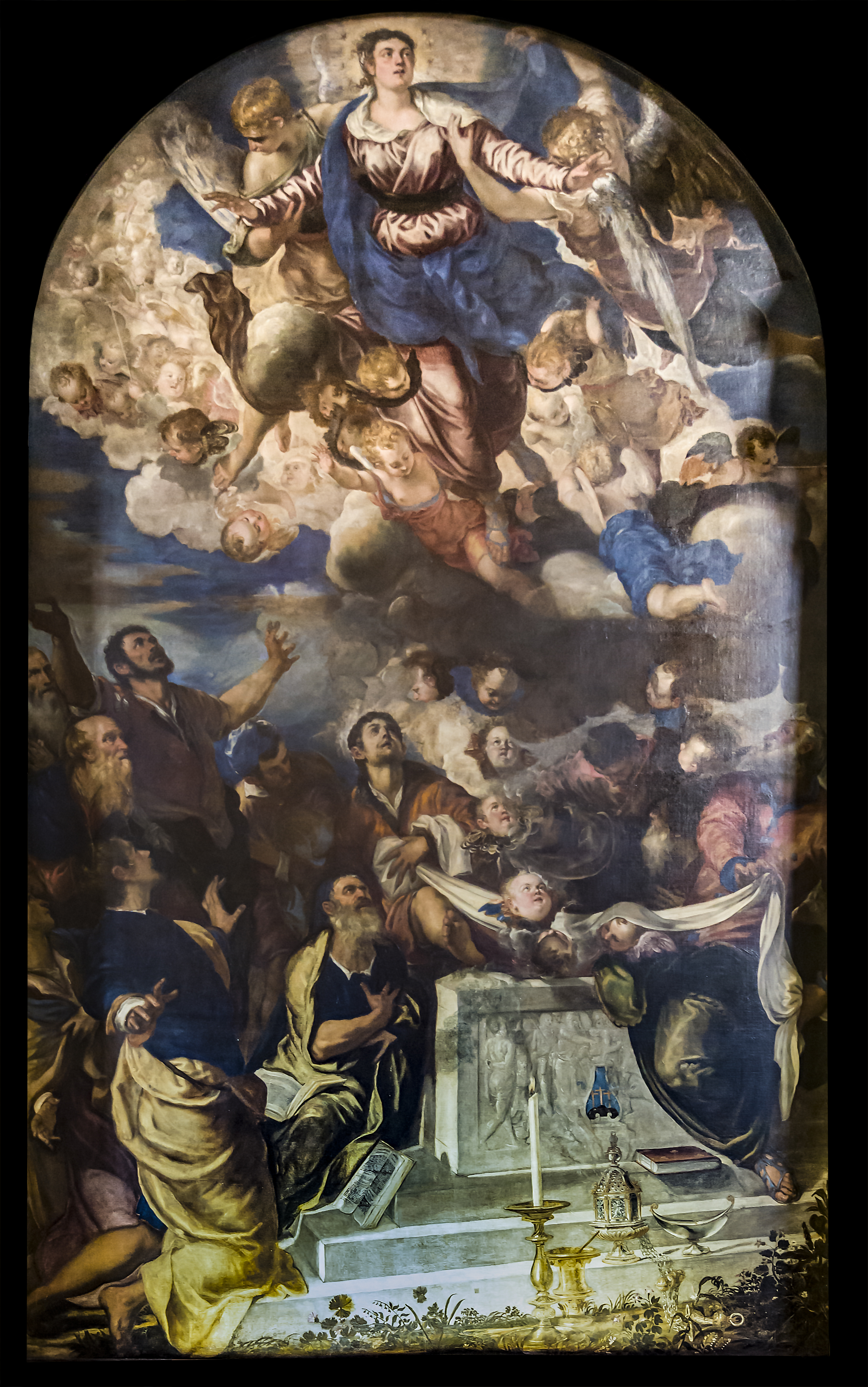
Assumption of Mary by Tintoretto

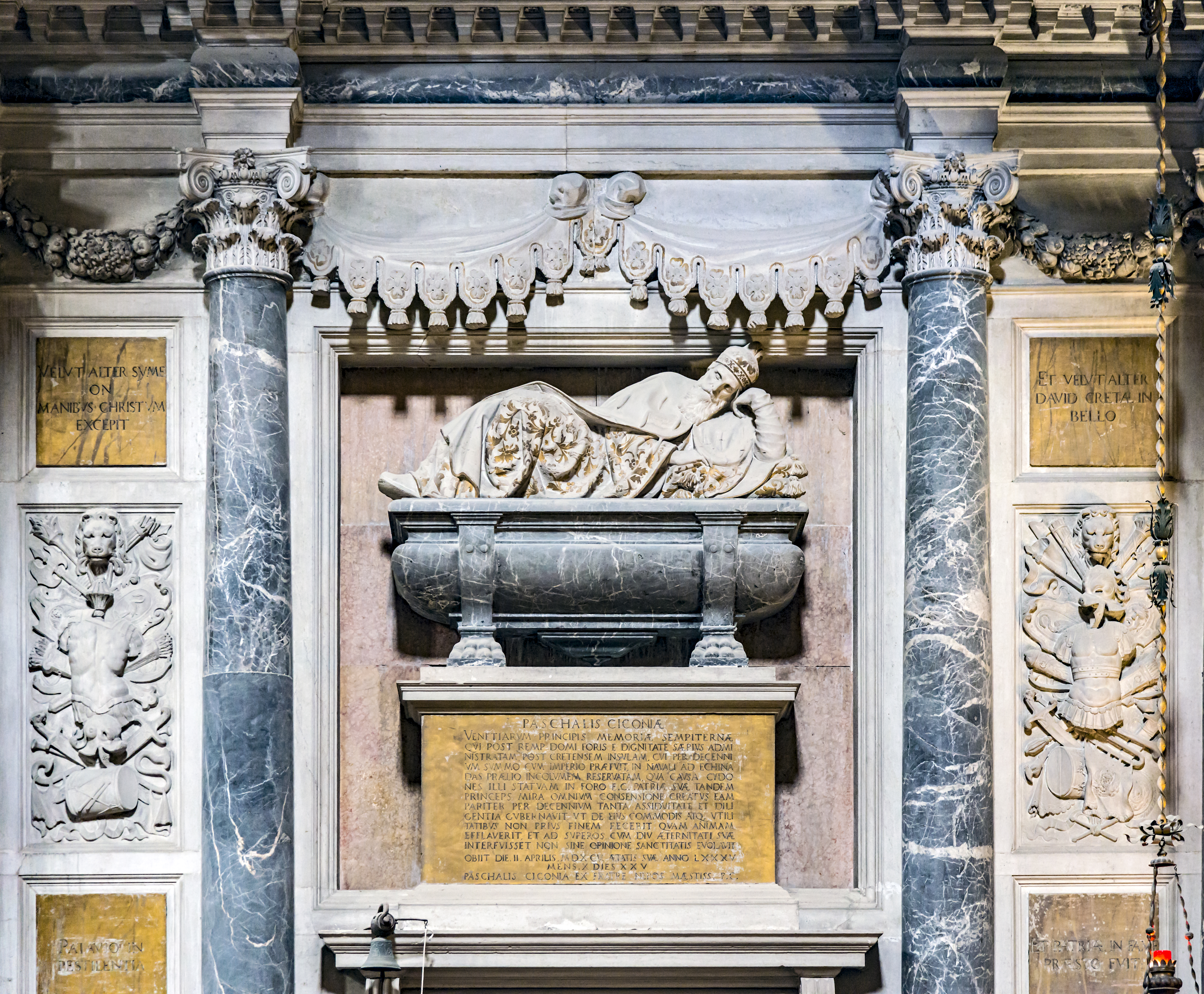
Monument funéraire du doge Pasquale Cicogna

==== The Sacristy ====
The sacristy hosts twenty paintings of Palma the Younger.

- On the ceiling the central picture represents The fall of the Manna ; Table of right David receives from the priest Achimlech the loaves offered in the sanctuary ; Left table Elijah fed by the angel .
- To the walls

Wall of the entrance door, in the center, The Martyrdom of Saint John the Baptist between Saint Lanfranco Beccari and Saint Libere In 1610 originally painted for the altar of the schola dei Varoteri but replaced by Saint Lanfranco Beccari between John the Baptist and Saint Liberius of Cima da Conegliano Fitzwilliam Museum in Cambridge.
left side. Portrait in foot of saint Helene (mother of Constantine) and "Saint Helena finds the true cross"
right side. "The Emperor Heraclius brings back the cross of Calvary".
Left wall: Full-length portrait of the Cyriac of Jerusalem; Alexander III confirms the Crucifixes and gives them the rule - Pius II gives the silver crosses to the crucifers; Portrait of Lanfranco Beccari.
Altar wall To the right of the altar: The bronze serpent , then a full-length portrait of the third pope, Anacletus, both between 1592 and 1593. 'The altar' 'Pope San Cleto founds the Order of the Crucifixes - The Bishop of St. Cyril of Jerusalem confirms the Order' (1620 1622).

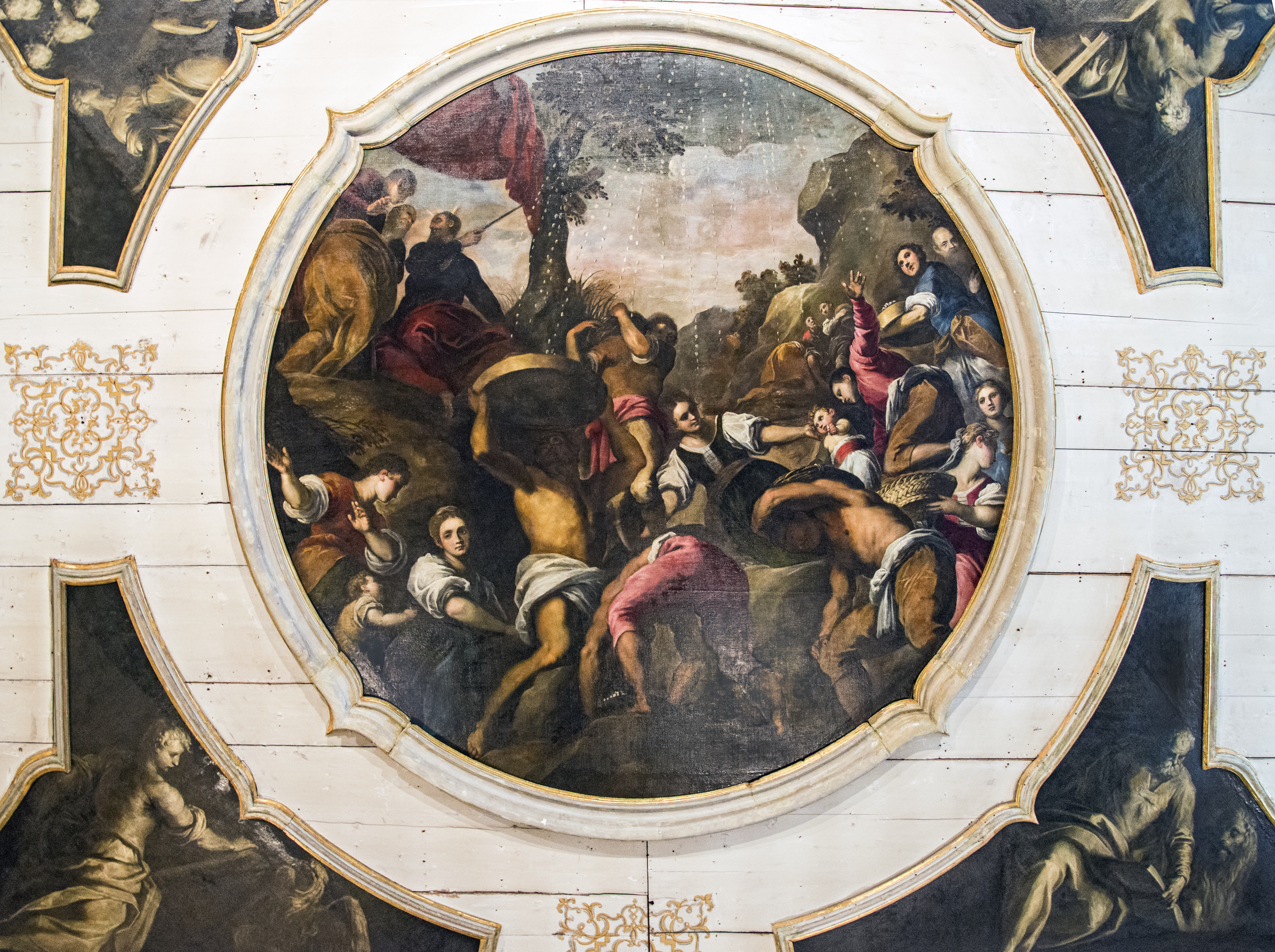
The fall of the Manna Palma il Giovane

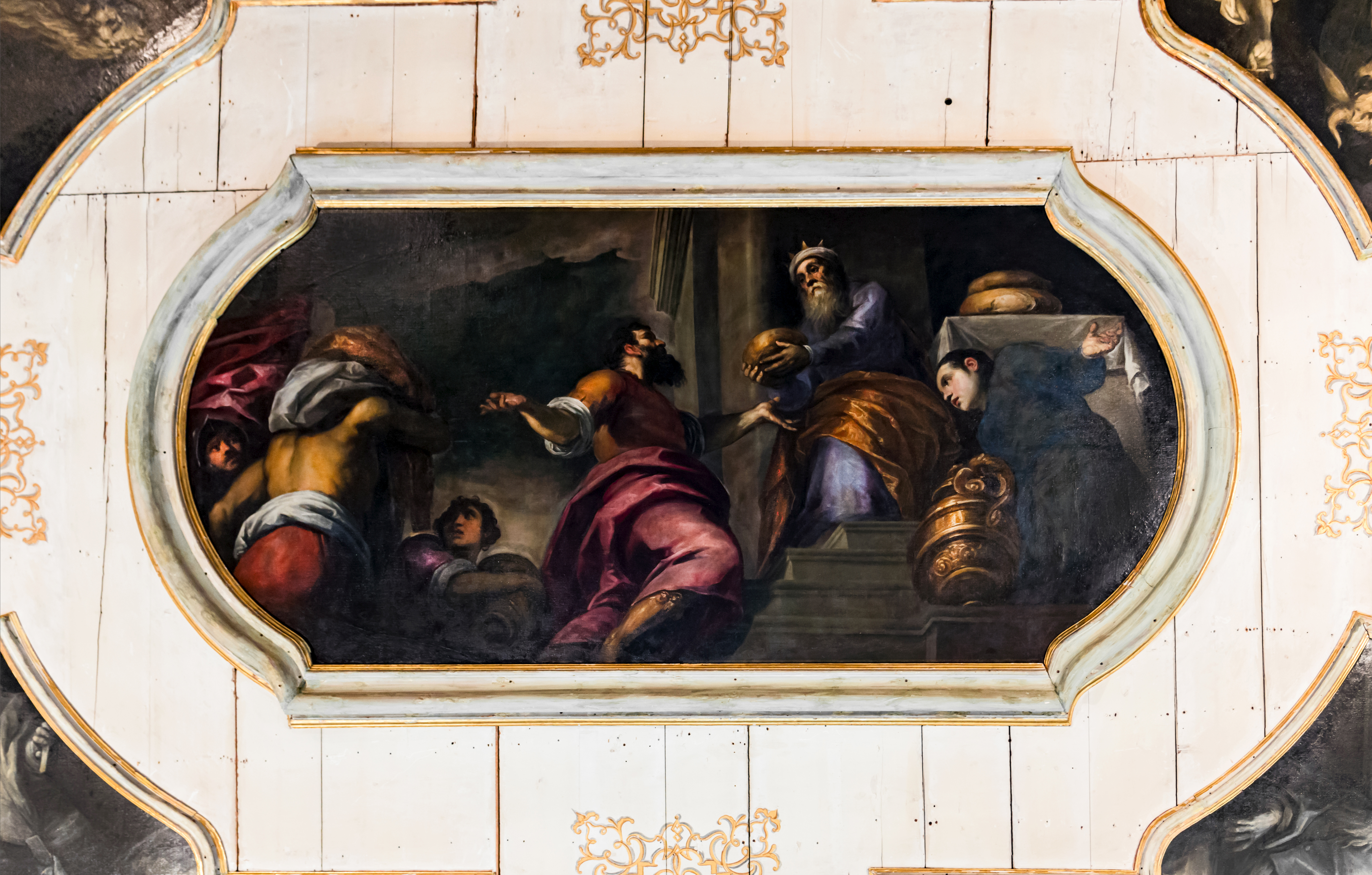
David receives from the priest Ahimelech the bread offered in the sanctuary

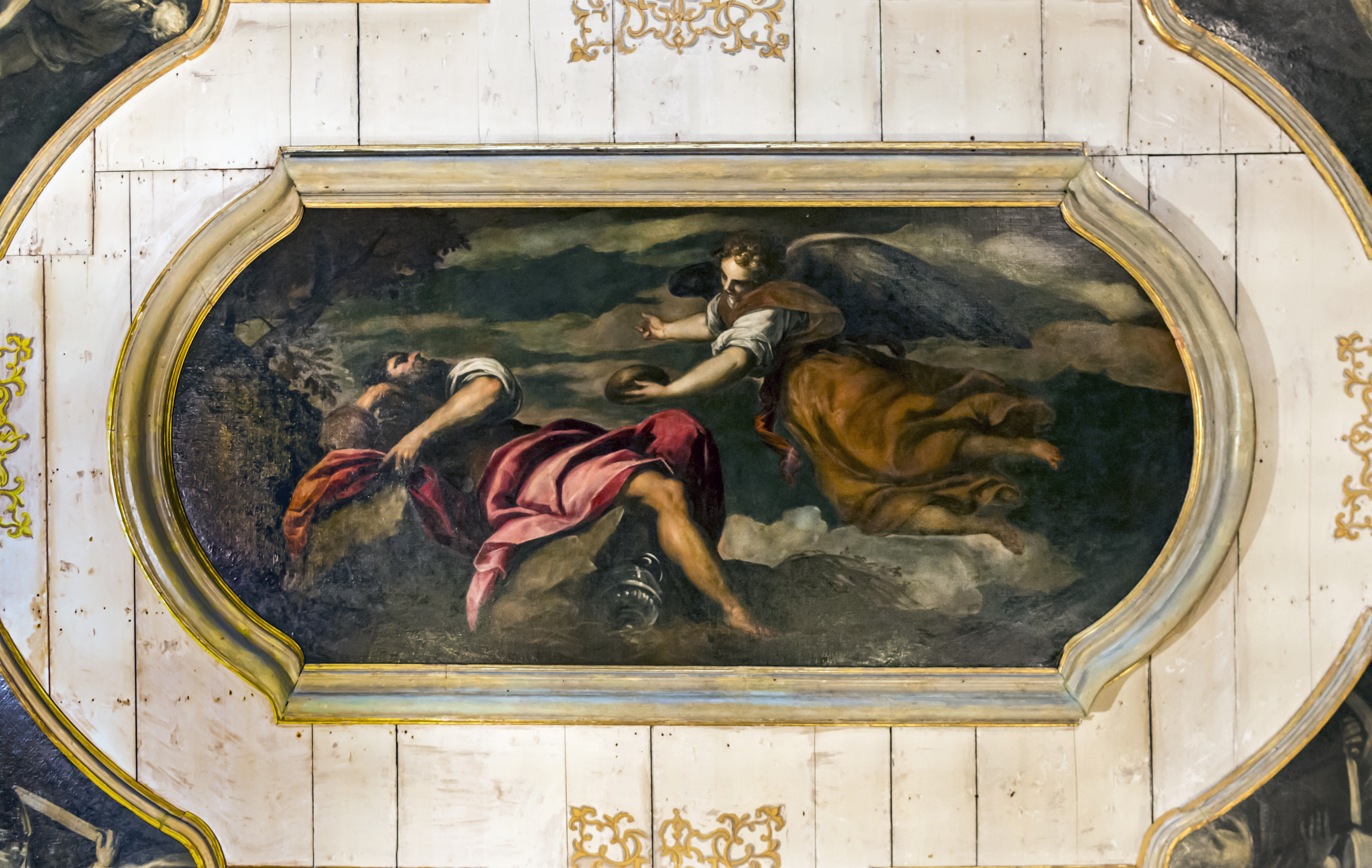
Elijah nourished by the angel
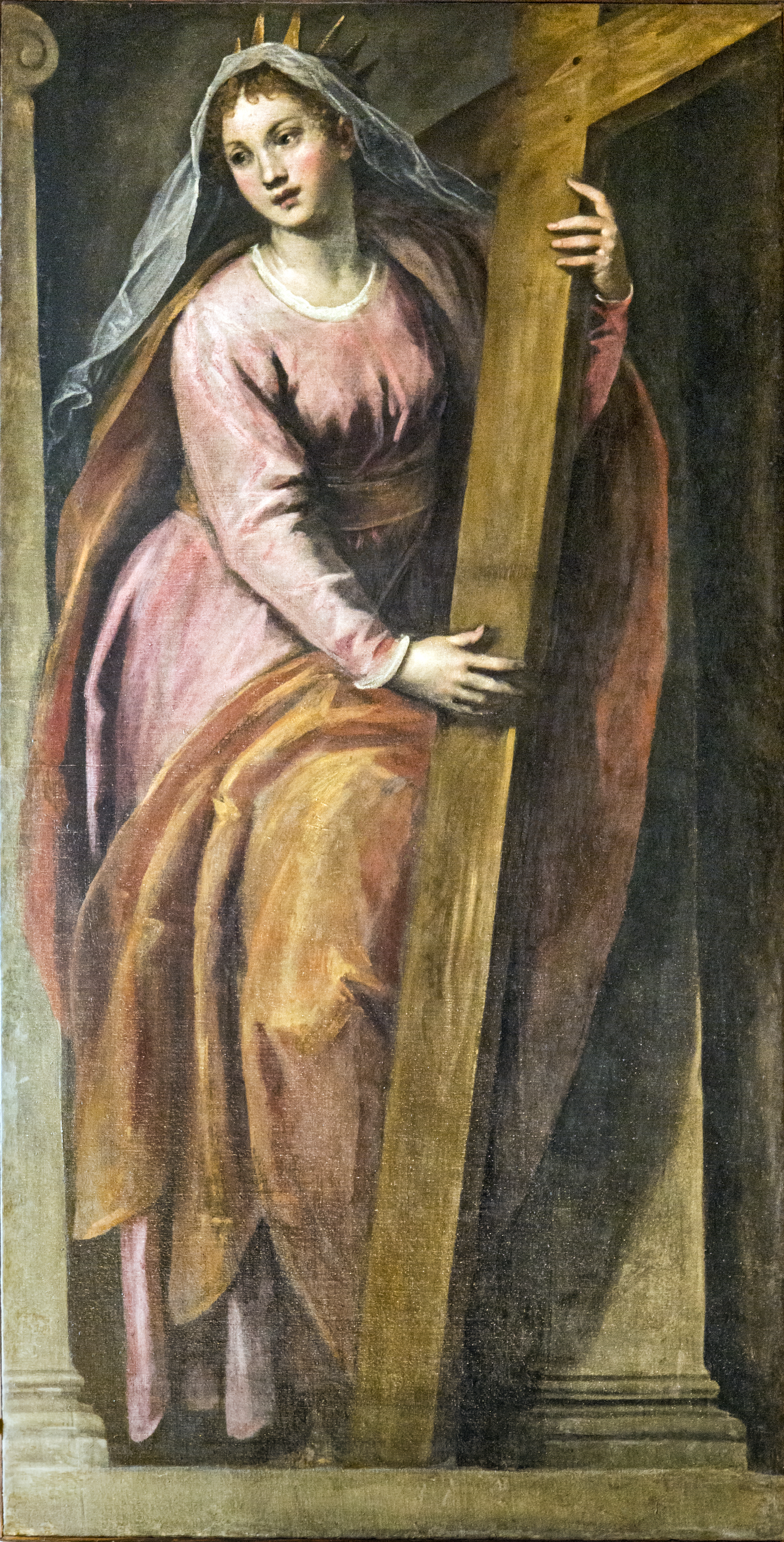
Saint Helena

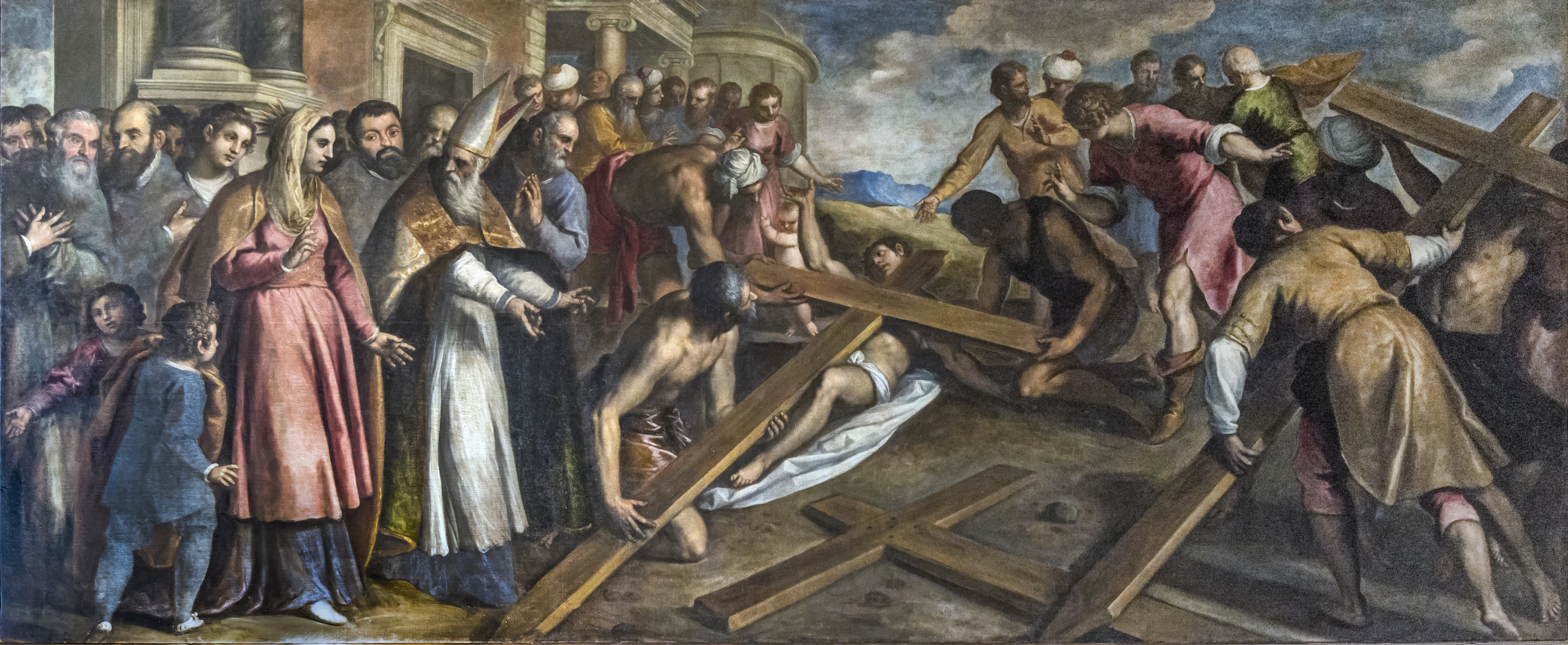
Saint Helena finds the true cross

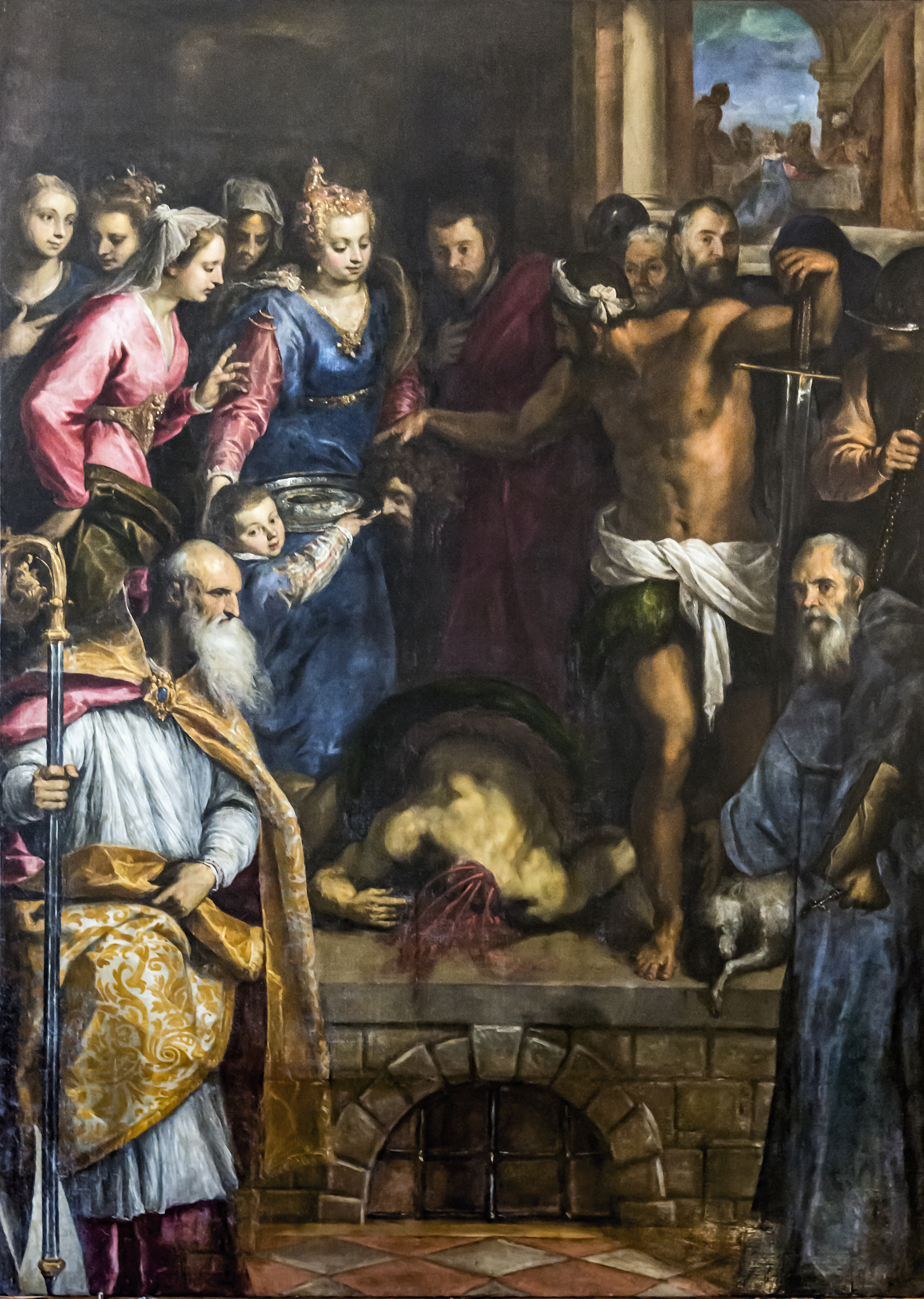
Martyrdom of John the Baptist with Saint Lanfranc Beccari and Saint Liberius

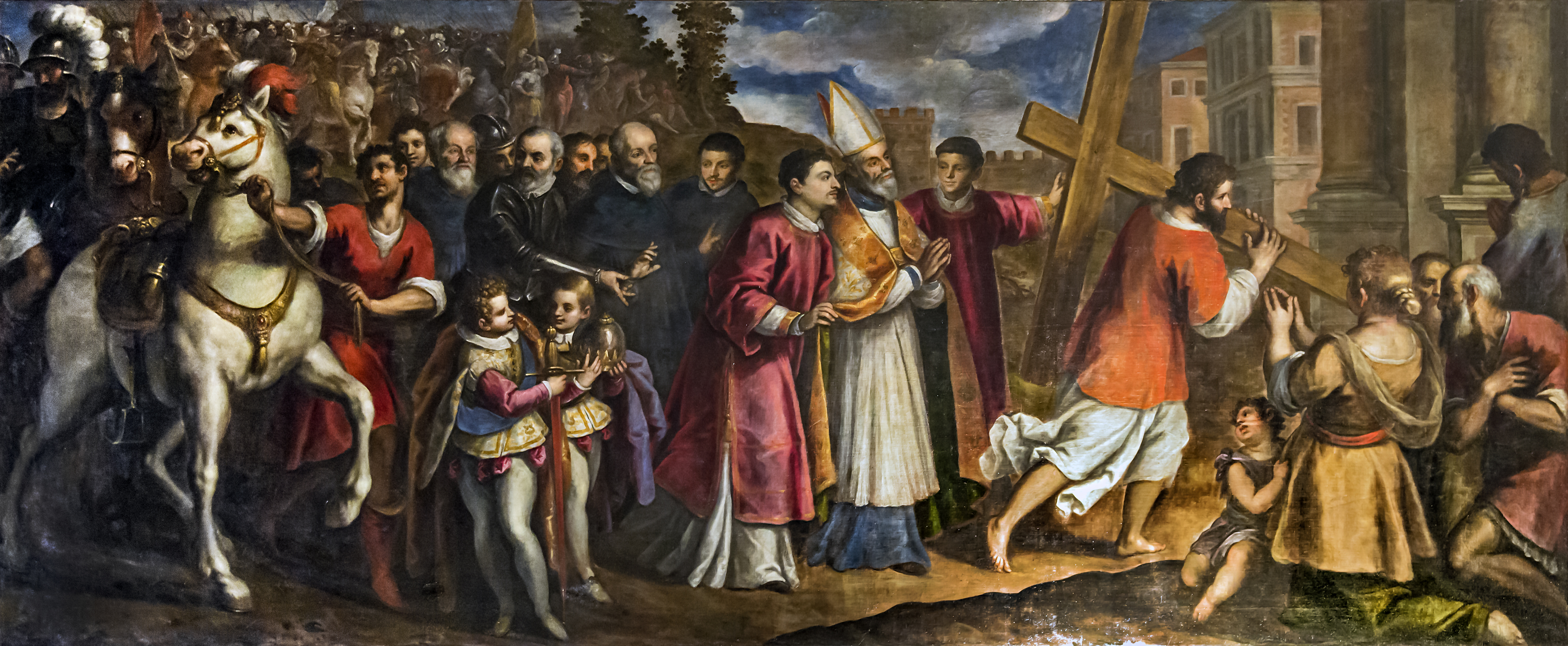
The Emperor Heraclius reports the cross of Calvary.
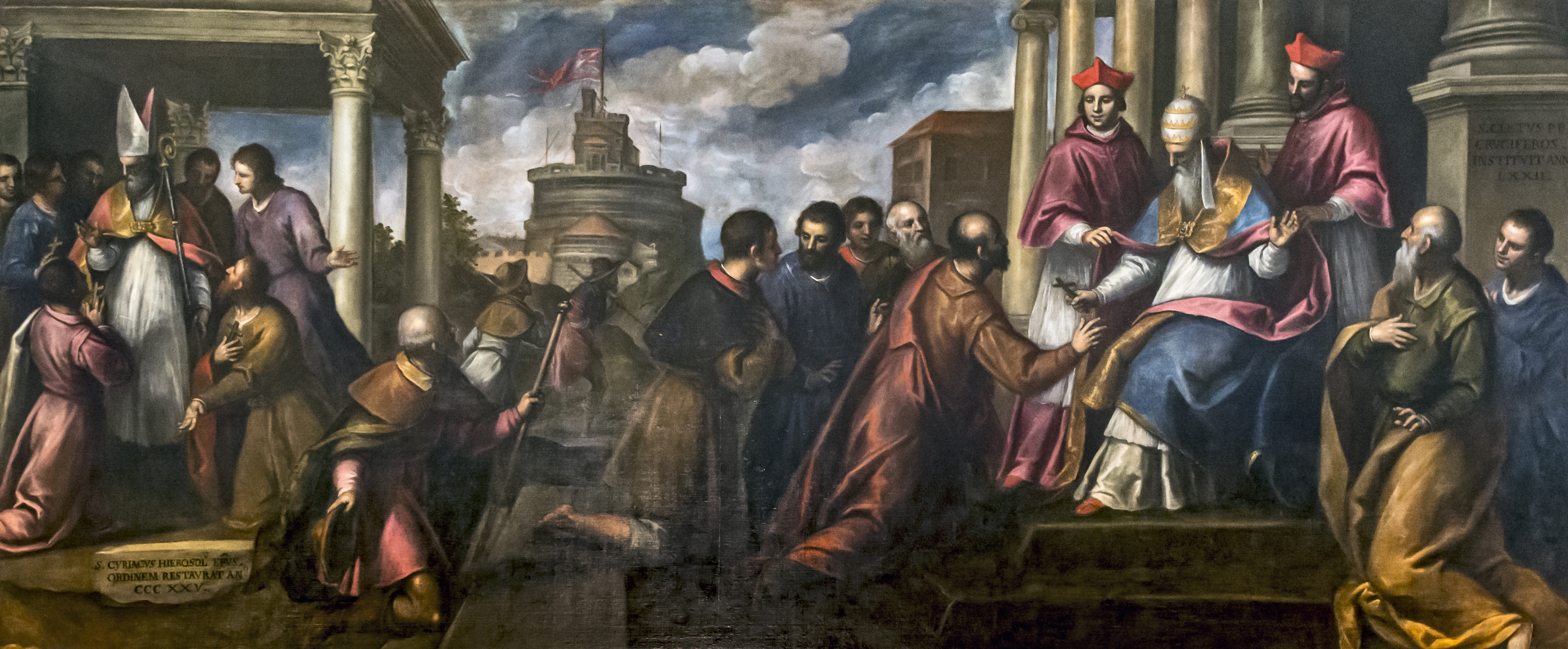
Pope San Cleto founds the Order of the Crucifixes

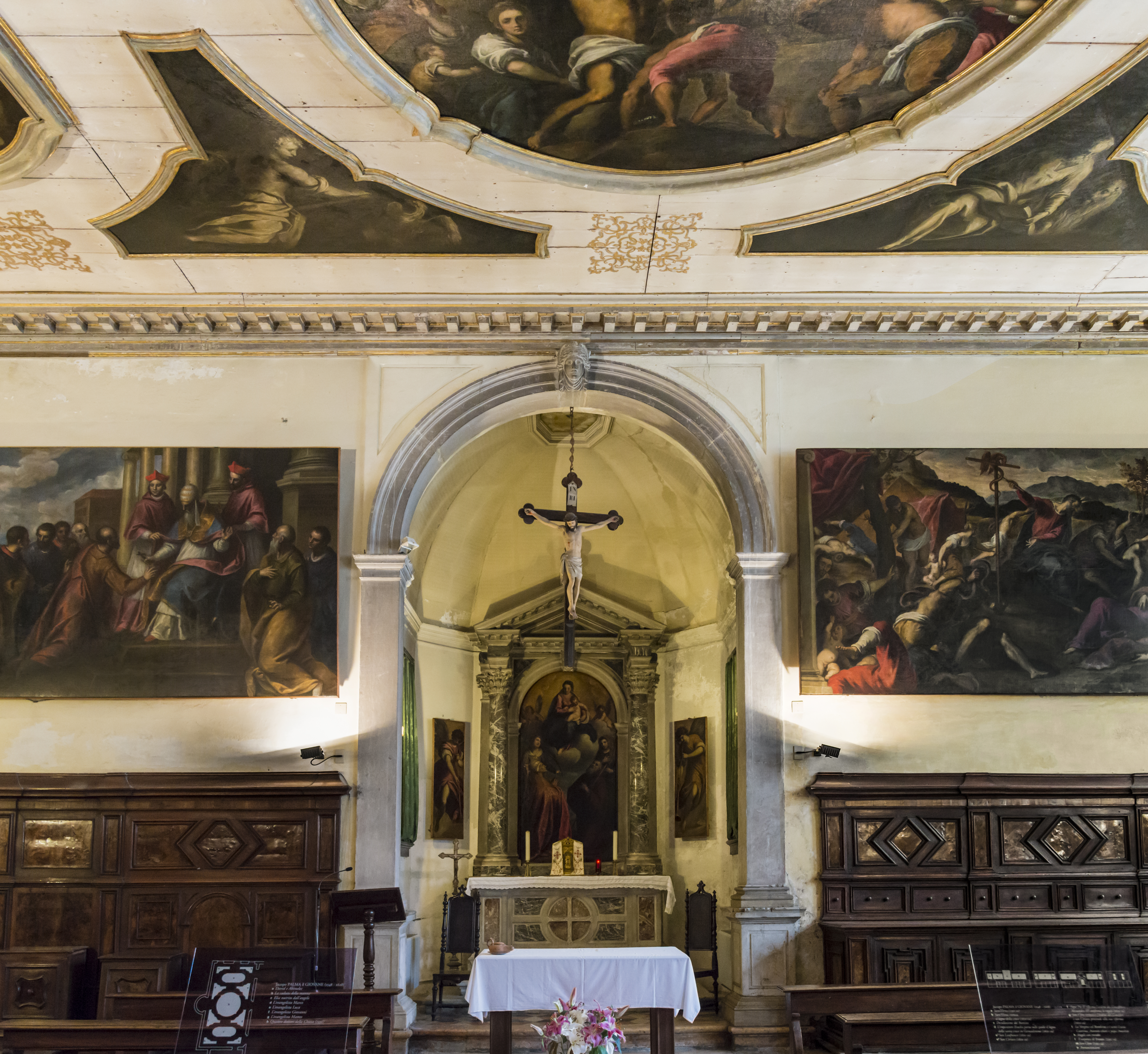
Sacristy.

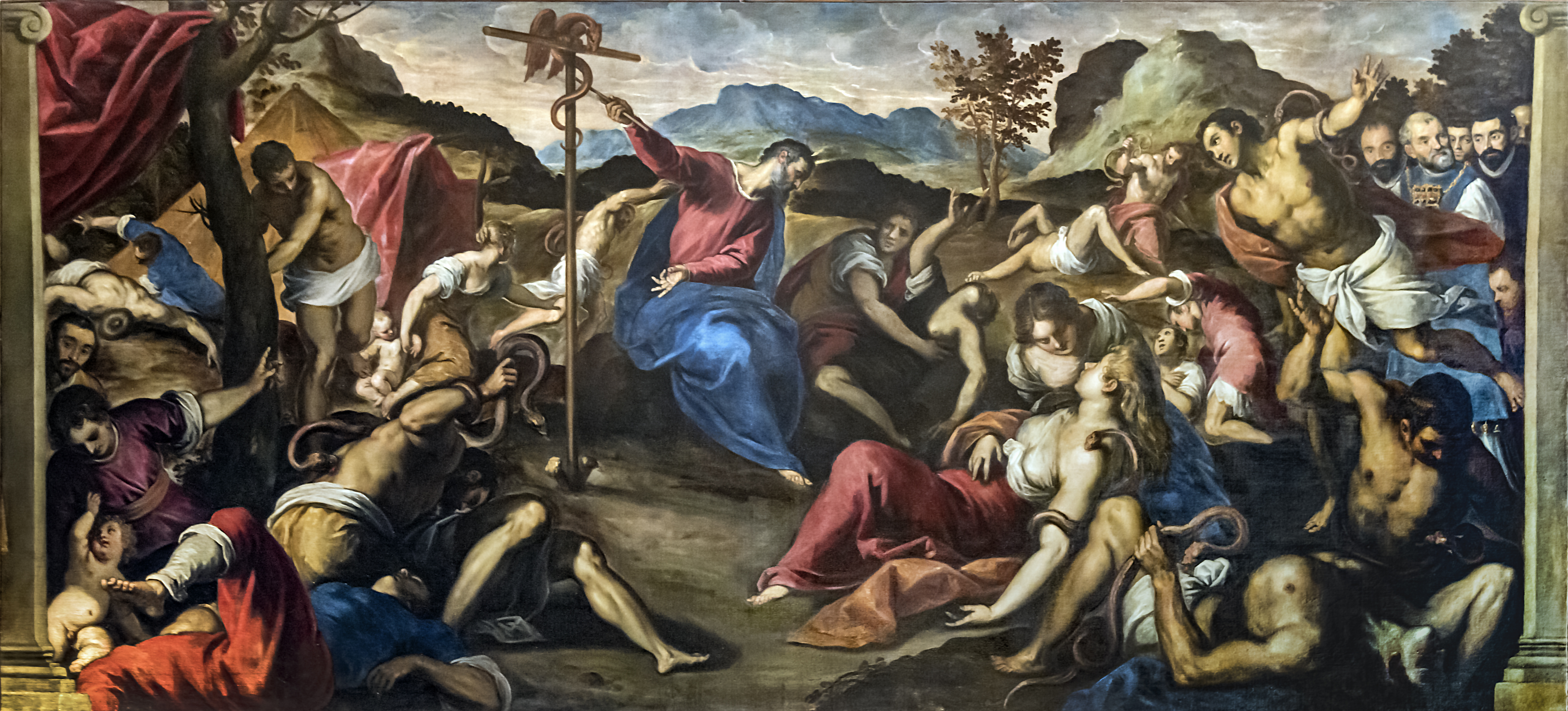
The bronze serpent (1592-1593)

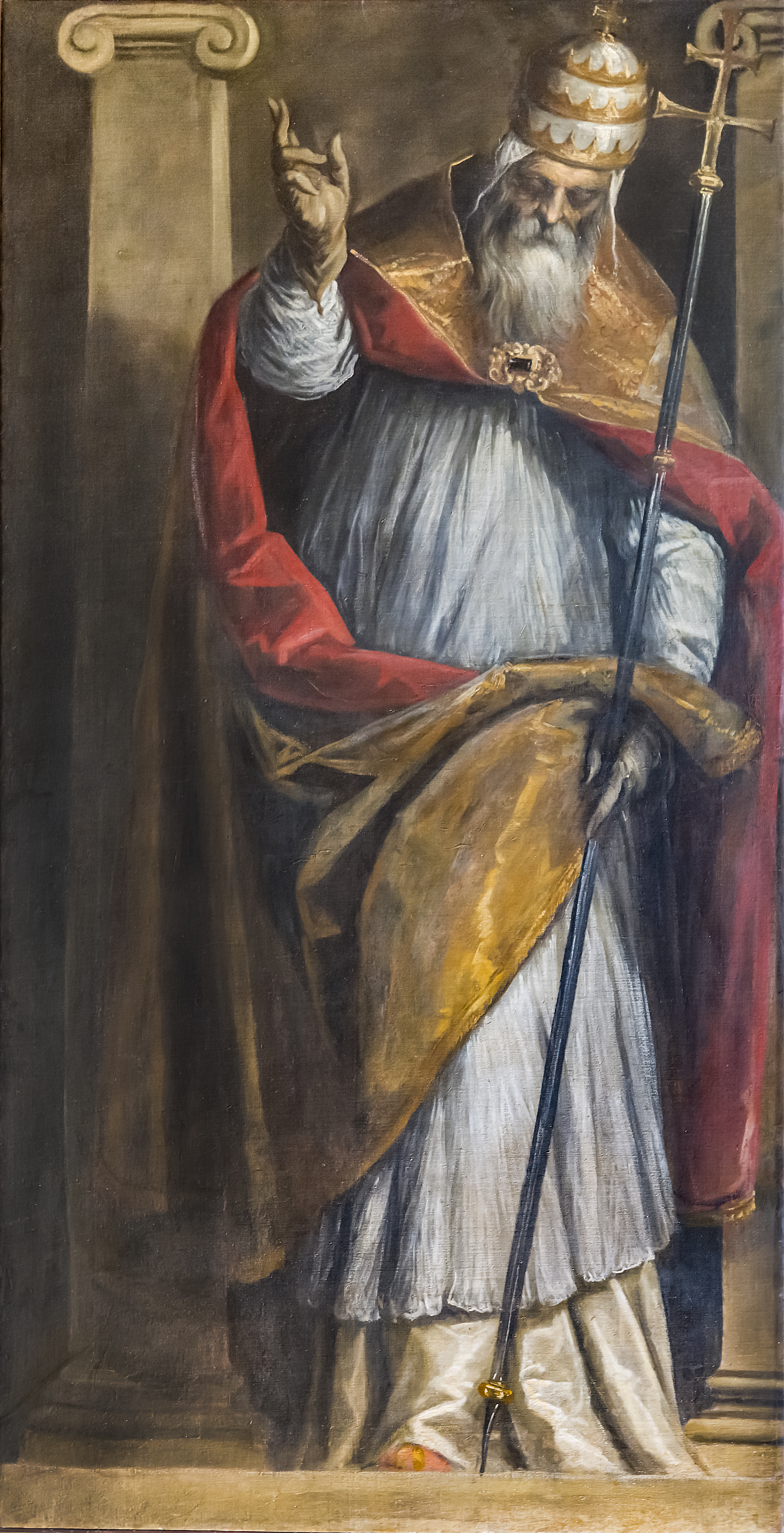
Pope San Cleto (1592-1593)
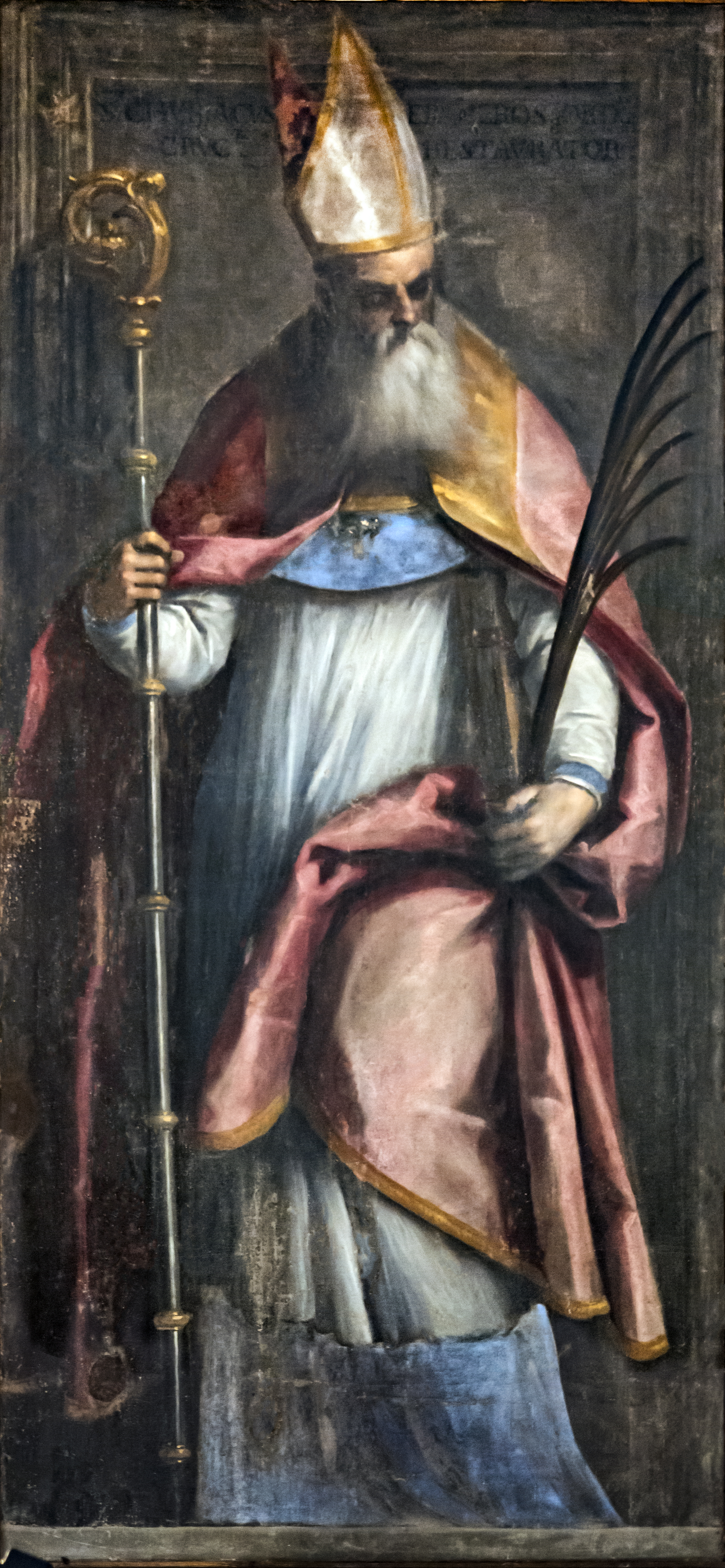
Judas Cyriacus

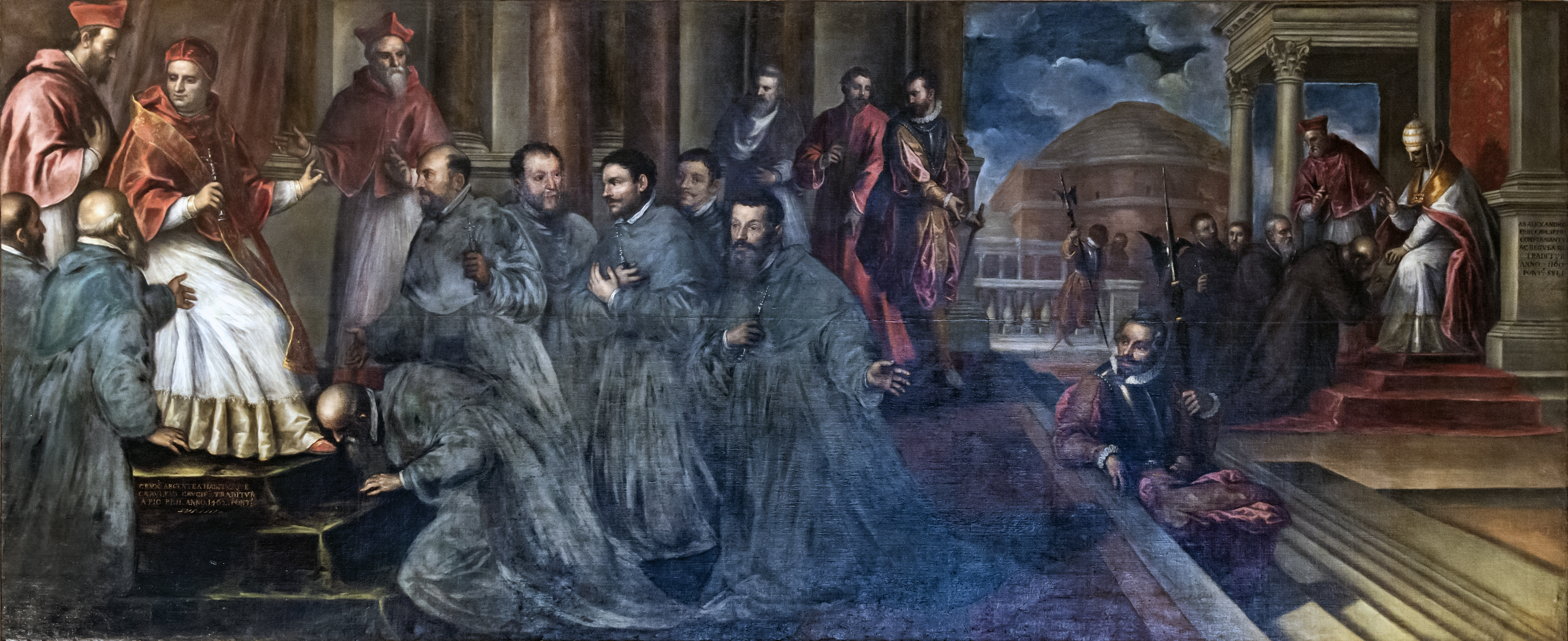
Alexander III confirms the Crucifixes and gives them the rule - Pius II will give the Crucifixes the silver cross and the blue robe.

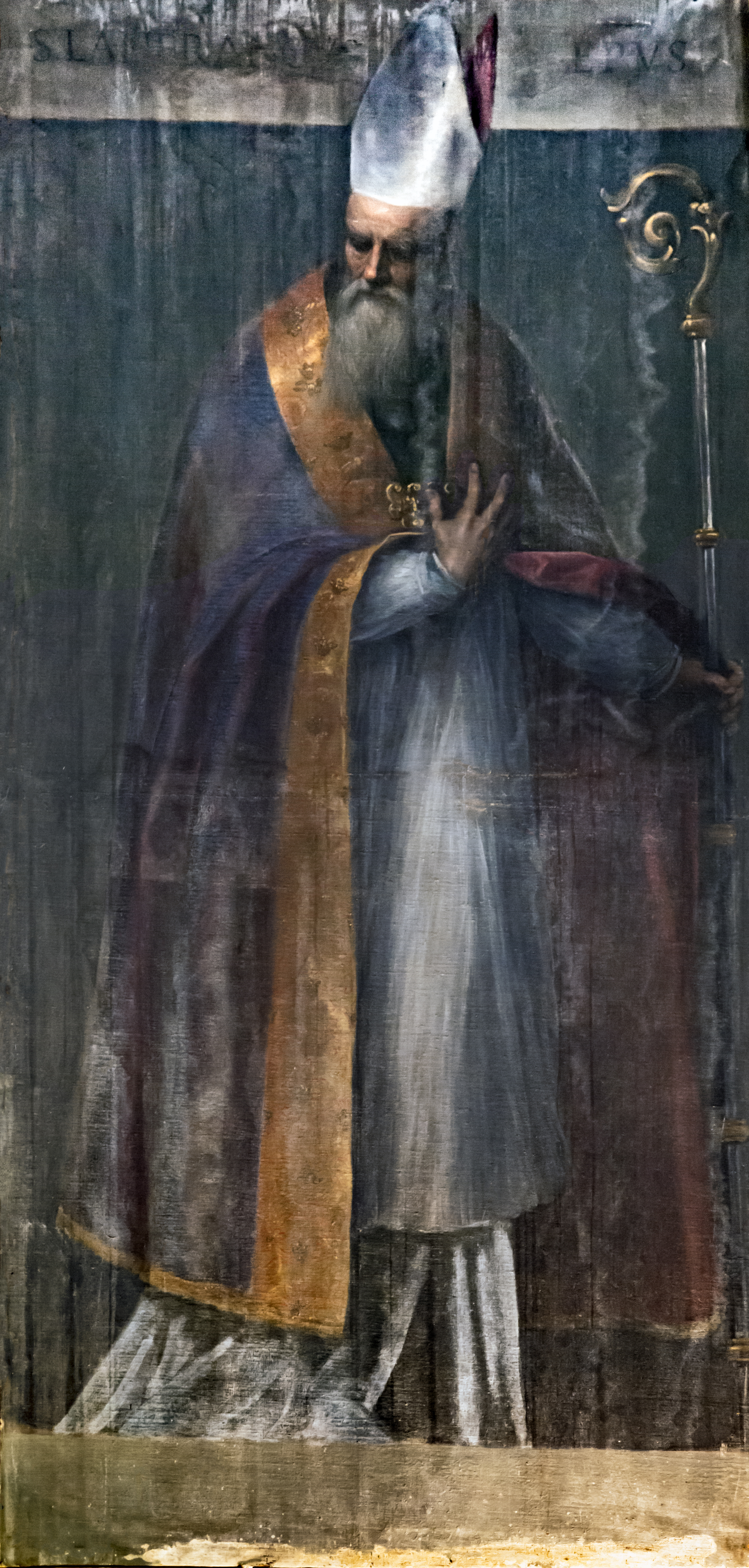
Lanfranco Beccari

=== Center of the transept ===
On the ceiling is a fresco by Louis Dorigny, The triumph of the name of Jesus , [1732]. At the four corners adorning the pilasters the marble statues of the Archanges Michel, Gabriel, Raphael and Sariel by Giuseppe Torretti.

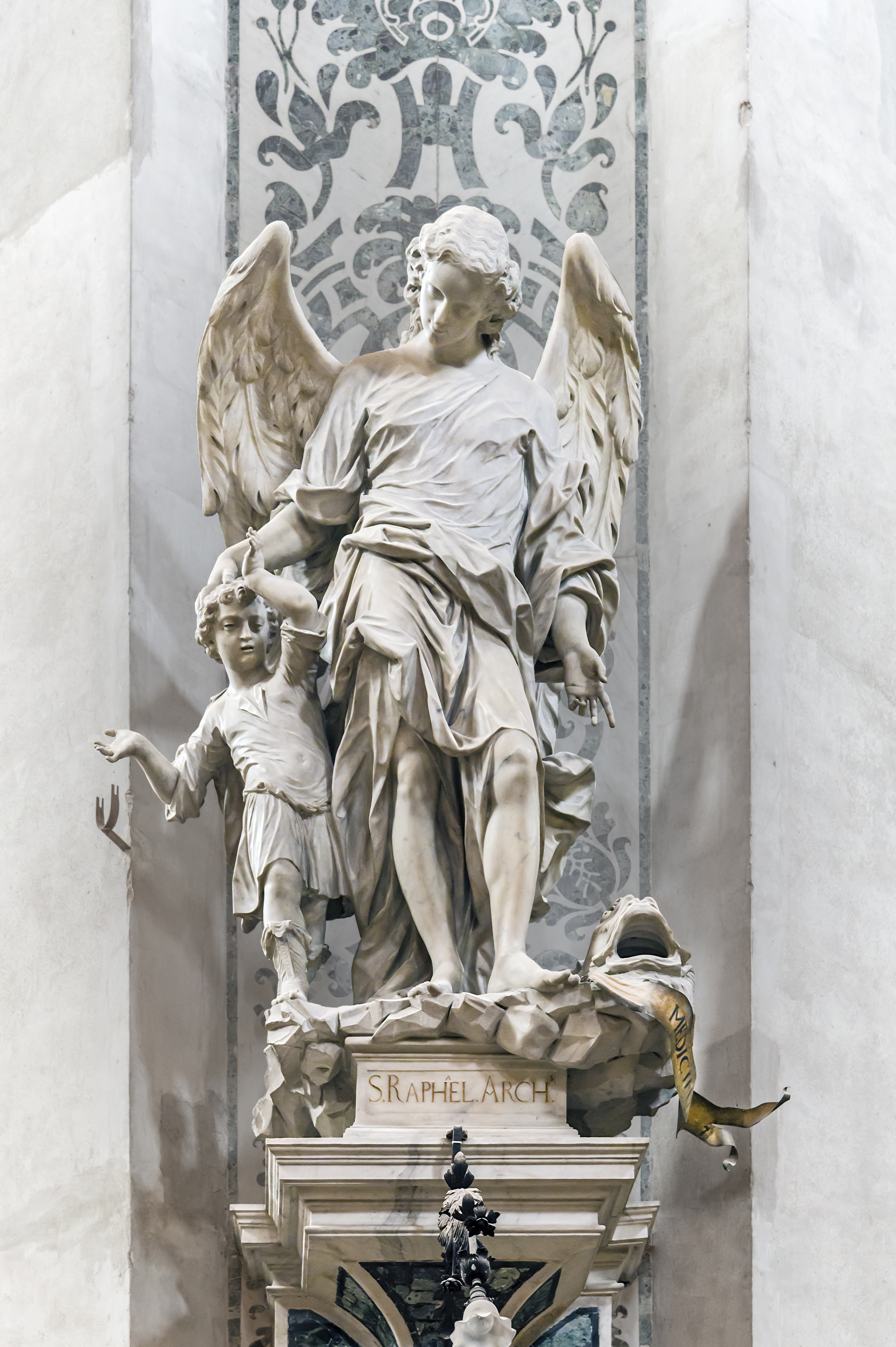
Archangel Raphael

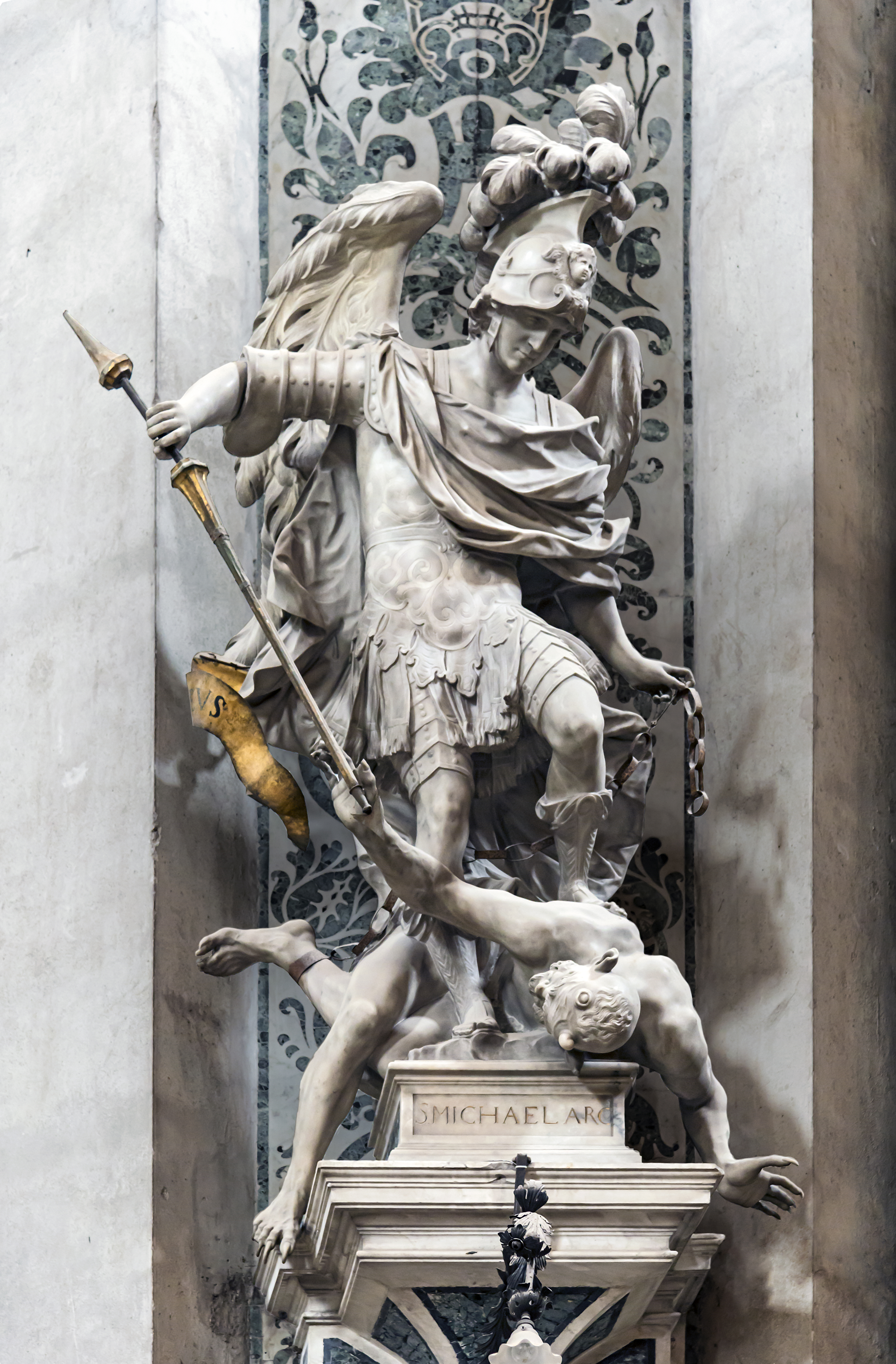
Archangel Michael

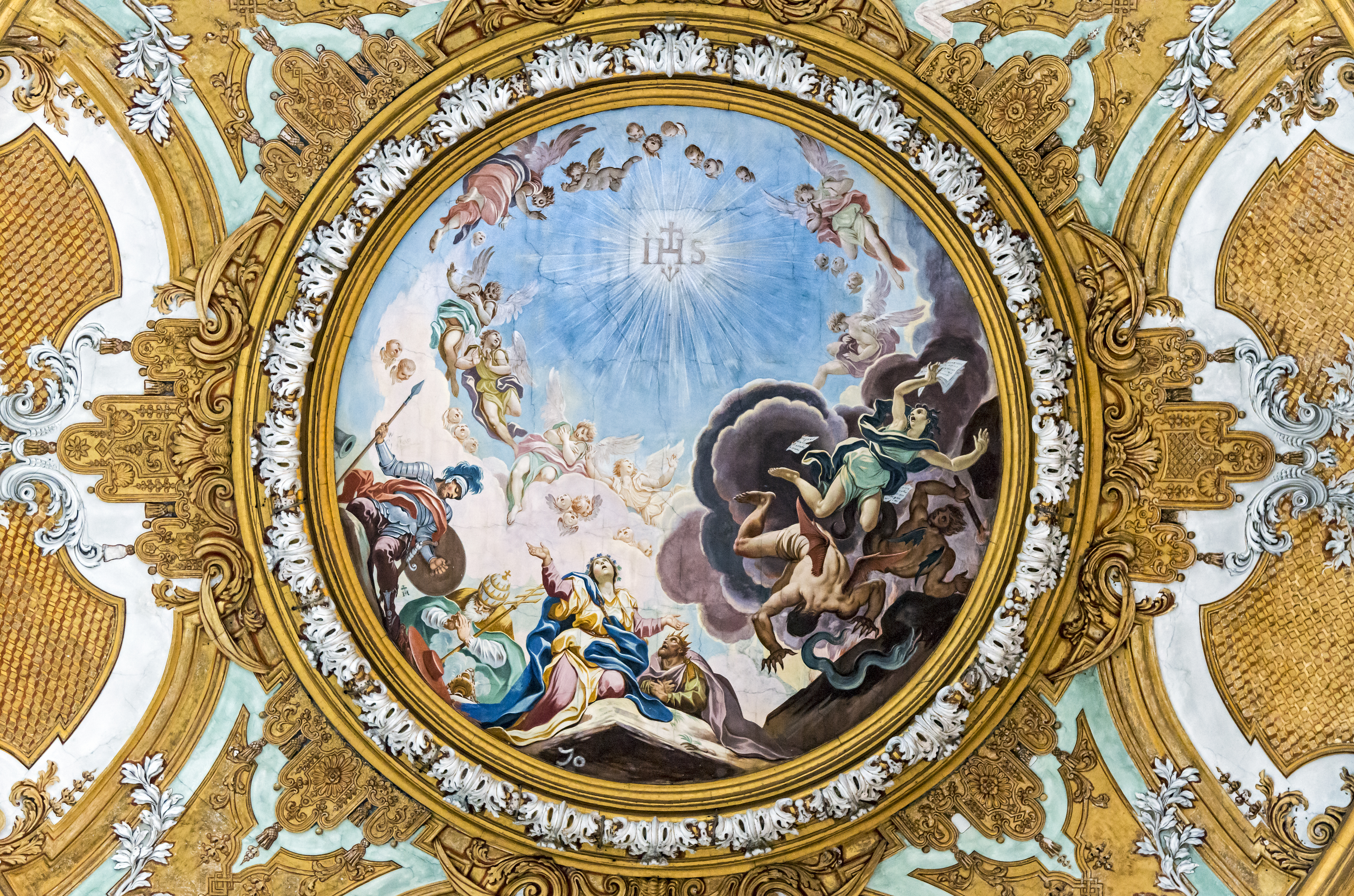
The triumph of the name of Jesus by Louis Dorigny

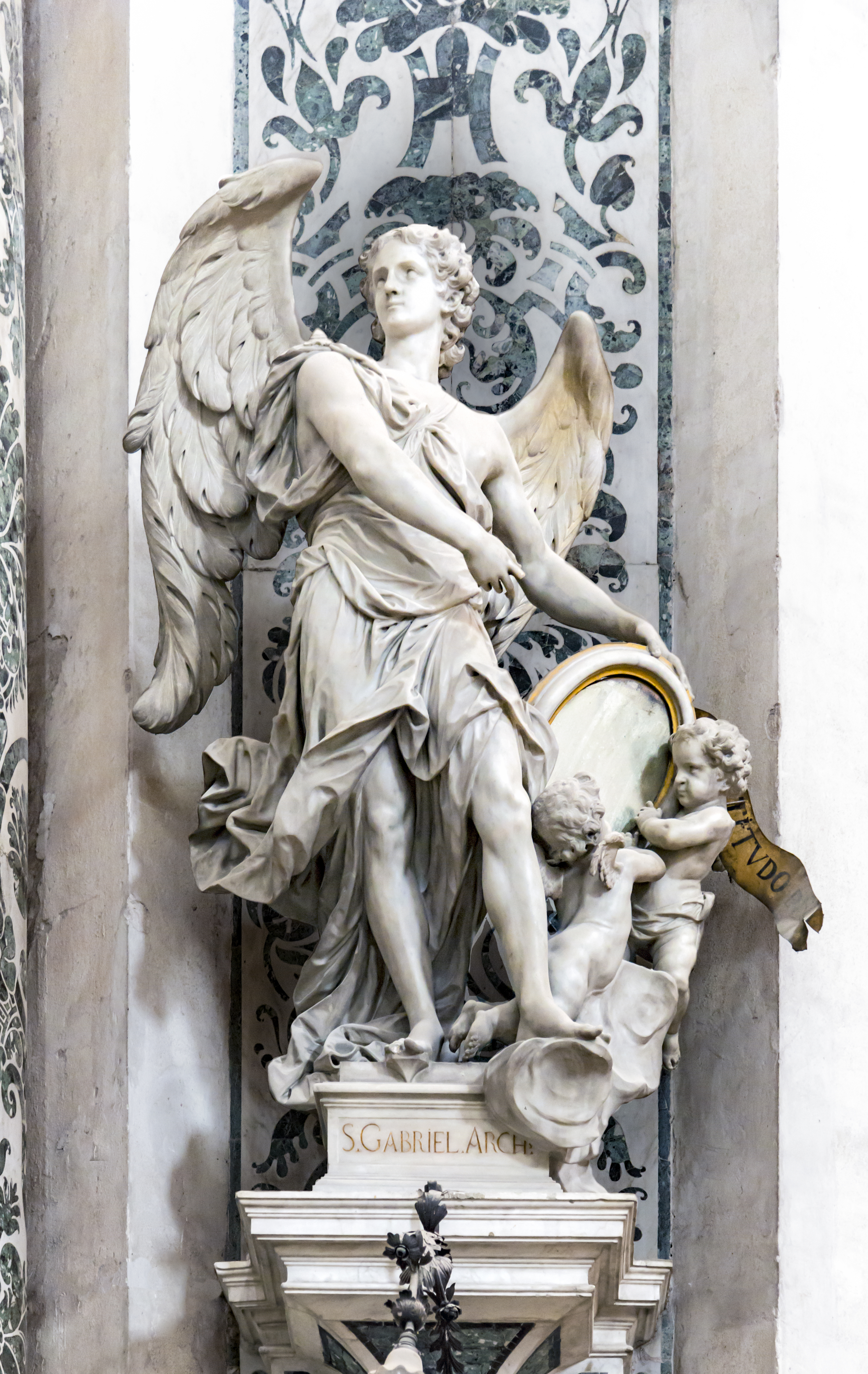
Archangel Gabriel

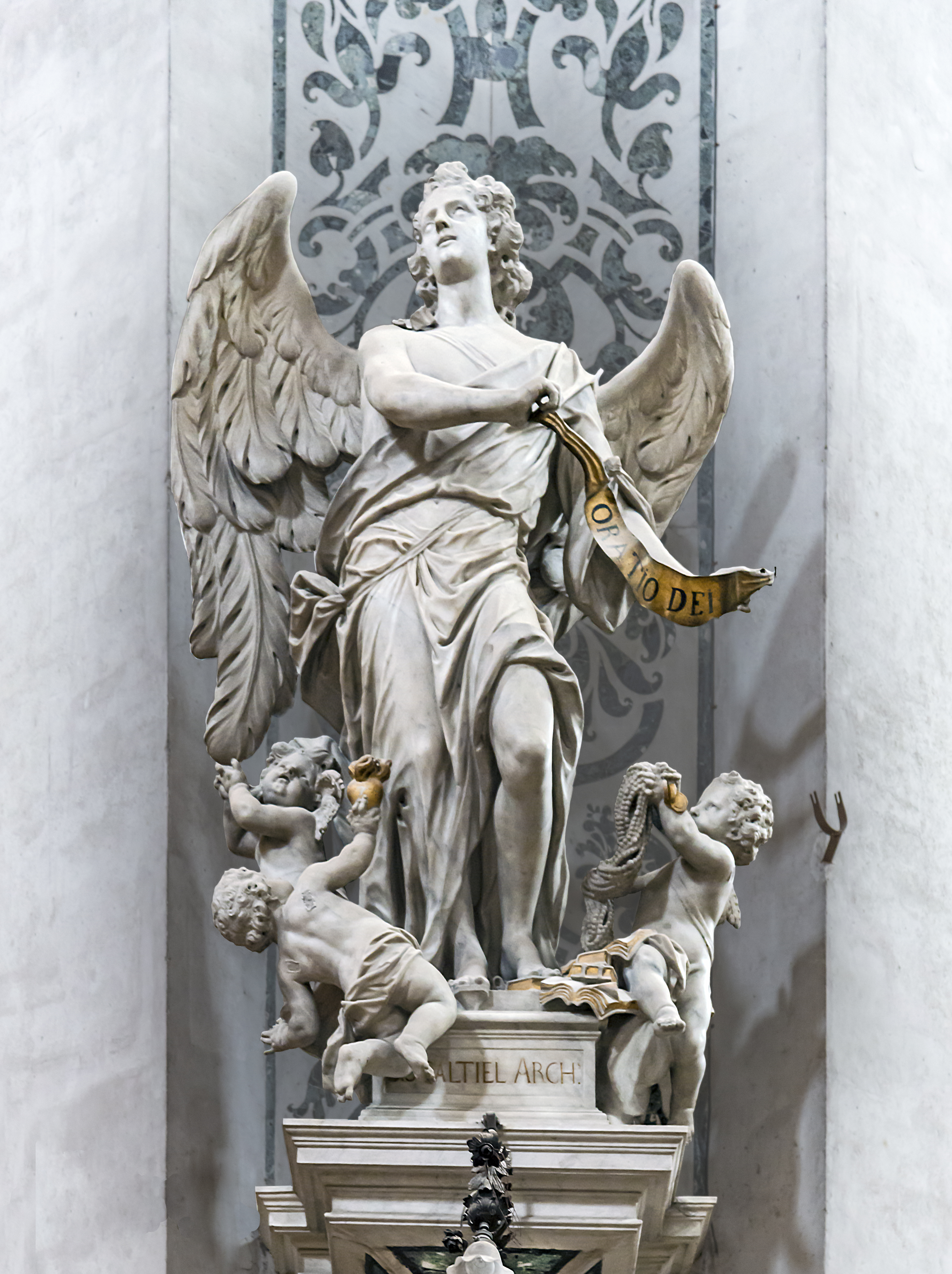
Archangel Selaphiel

=== Right transept ===
The chapel of Ignatius of Loyola

Erected at the expense of Vettor Grimani Procurator. In the center is the altarpiece, the statue of the founder of the Society of Jesus, Saint Ignatius, who shows the Constitutions of the Society of Jesus. On the wings of the pediment on each side of the great statue Faith and charity. On the front side of altar are bas-reliefs showing from left to right: Saint Ignatius giving these clothes to a poor man; Ignatius at Manresa; The vision of La Storta.

The organ of the right transept

It is the only functional one, its contralateral counterpart is artificial.

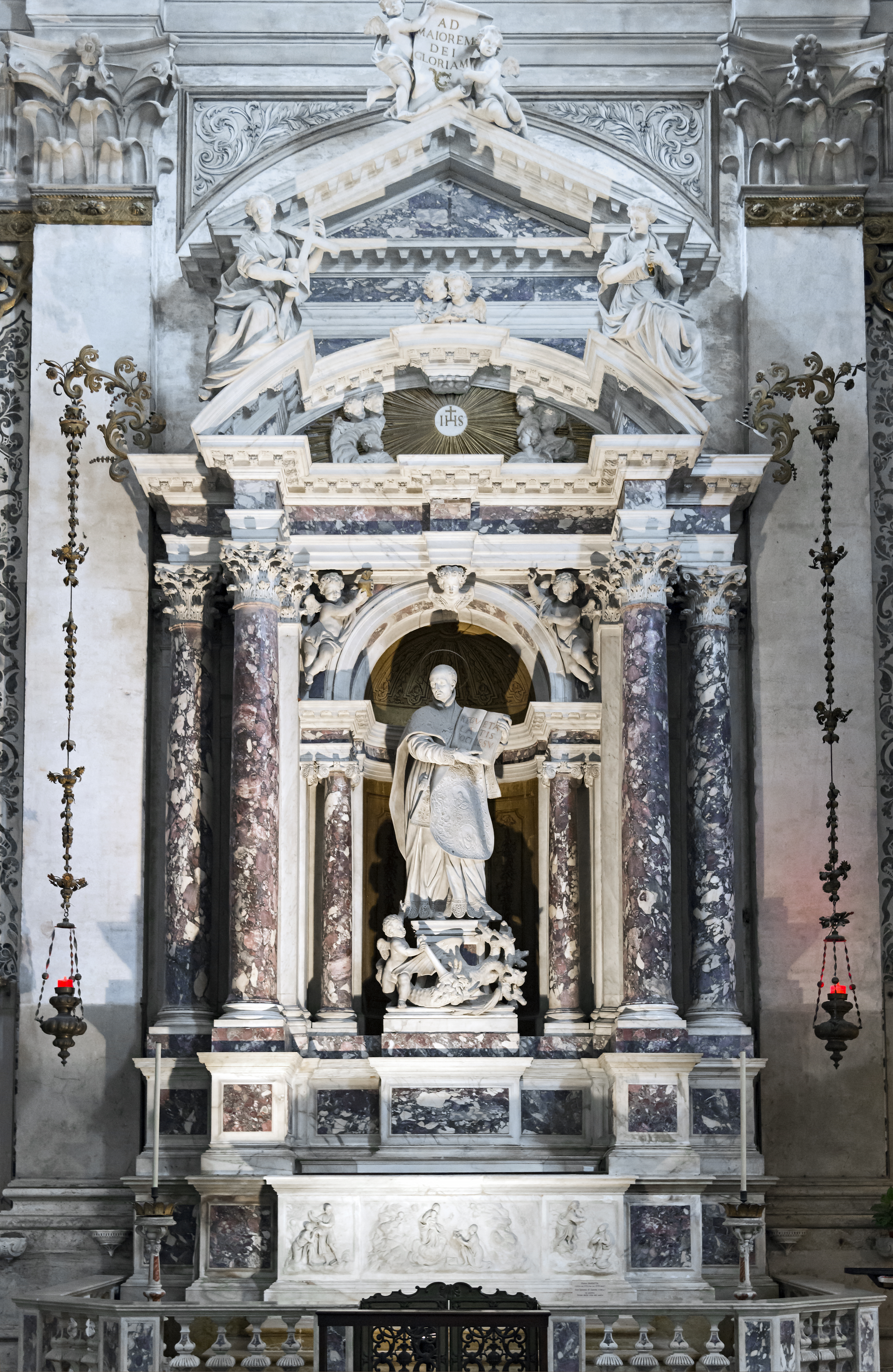
Ignatius of Loyola's Chappel

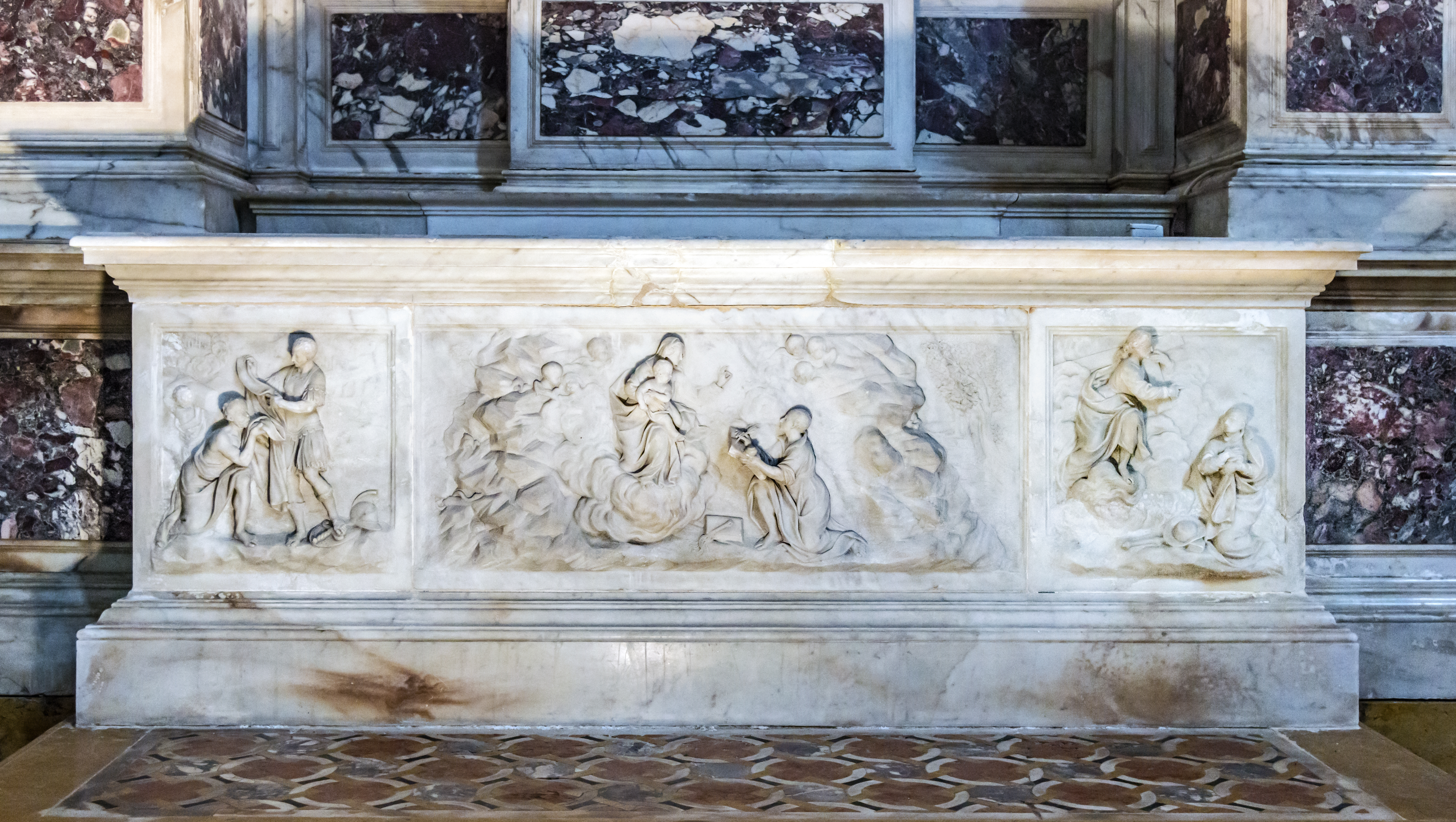
Altar of St.Ignatius

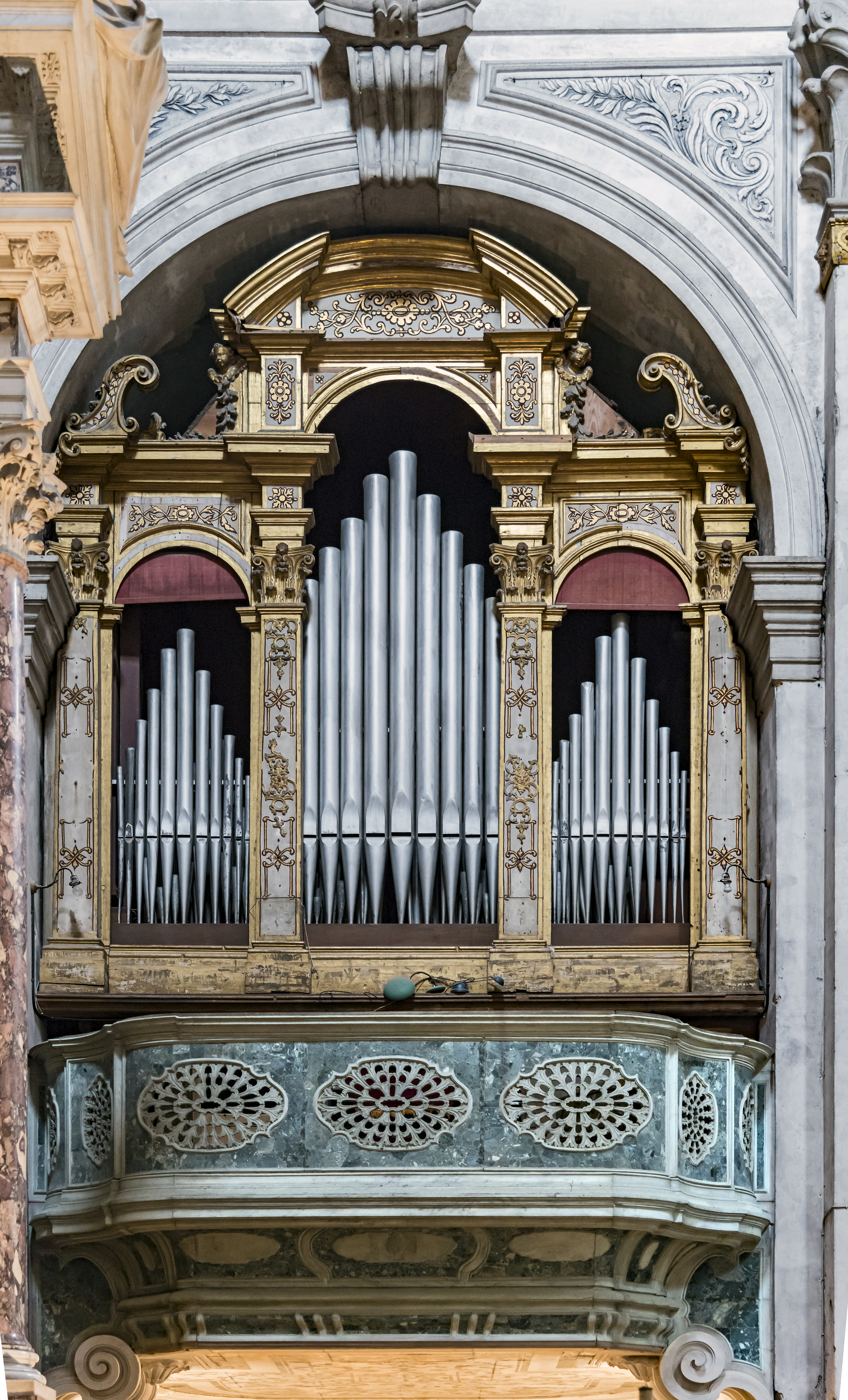
The Organ

=== Choir ===
The apse chapel on the left is dedicated to St. Joseph.
The table of the altarpiece depicts the death of Joseph by Domenico Clavarino.
The High Altar
The altar is dedicated to the Holy Trinity, it consists of a large awning with dome of white and green scales, which rests on ten columns twisted green marble.
Above the sumptuous tabernacle inlaid with lapis lazuli is placed a group of marble consisting of the eternal Father and Christ seated on the globe and the words "sufficit sola fide" (faith is all that you need) . From an opening under the dome of the canopy, it appears in the background, the rays of the Holy Spirit surrounded by celestial spirits.
On the sides of the altar: on a pedestal, the Archangels Barachiel and Uriel. The archangel Barachiel ("Blessing of God") is placed on the right side of the tabernacle, and according to tradition light the way of Israel. On the left the Archangel Uriel ("Light of God") is placed on the door of Eden, and the flaming sword is replaced by a Eucharistic lamp.
In the vault, a fresco: Angels musicians in glory by Louis Dorigny 1732.
The apsidal chapel on the right is dedicated to Saint Francis Xavier
The table of the altarpiece shows "the missionary Saint Francis Xavier who preaches in the Orient" by Pietro Liberi. The altarpiece is completed by a rich group of marble repenting the angels. It was erected as a votive offering by the Story Giovanni Paolo Giovanelli.
On the right wall: The funerary monument of General Orazio Farnese erected at the request of the Senate in 1675, in memory of the heroic conduct of the captain in the battle of the Dardanelles in 1654.

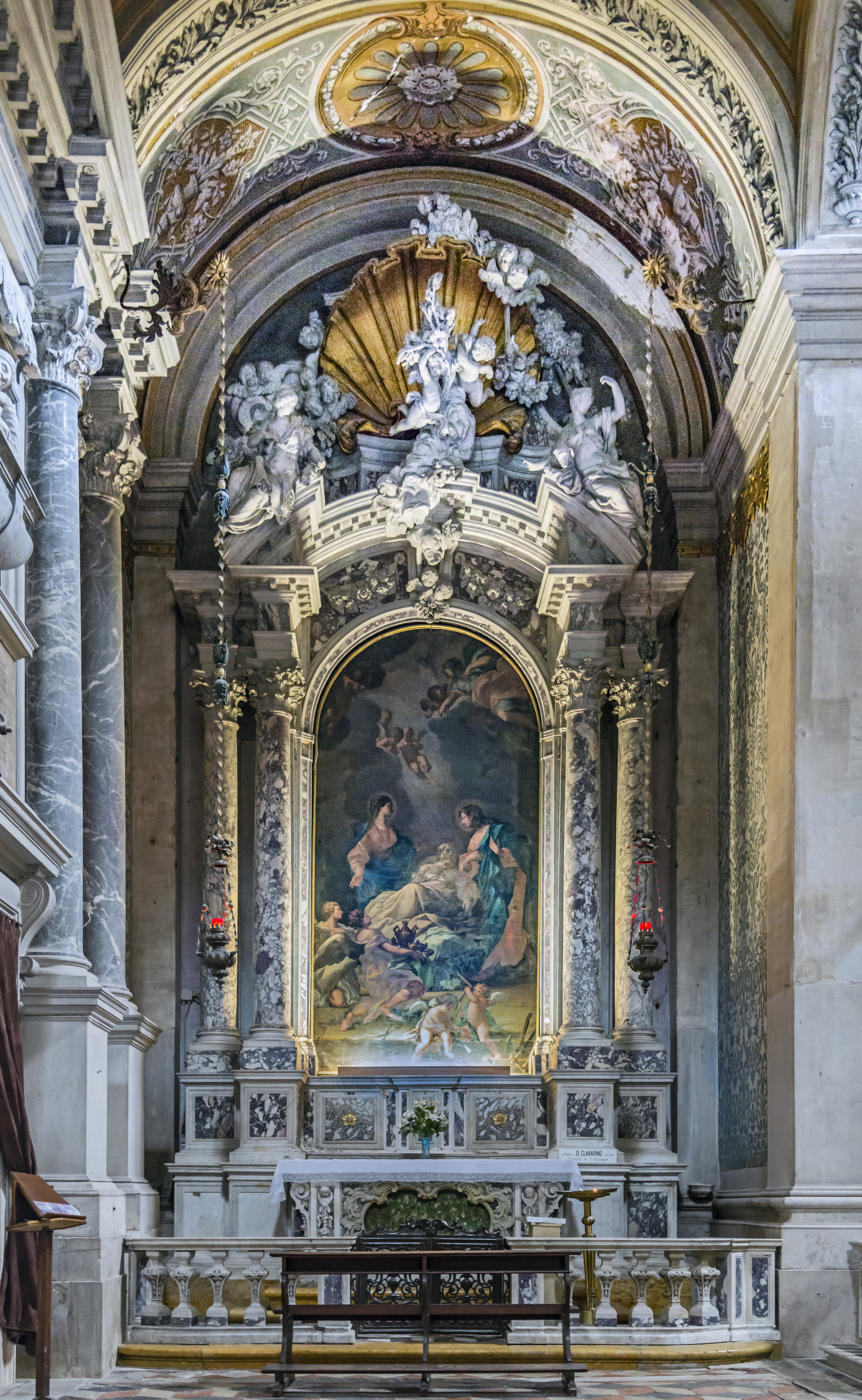
St. Joseph's chapel

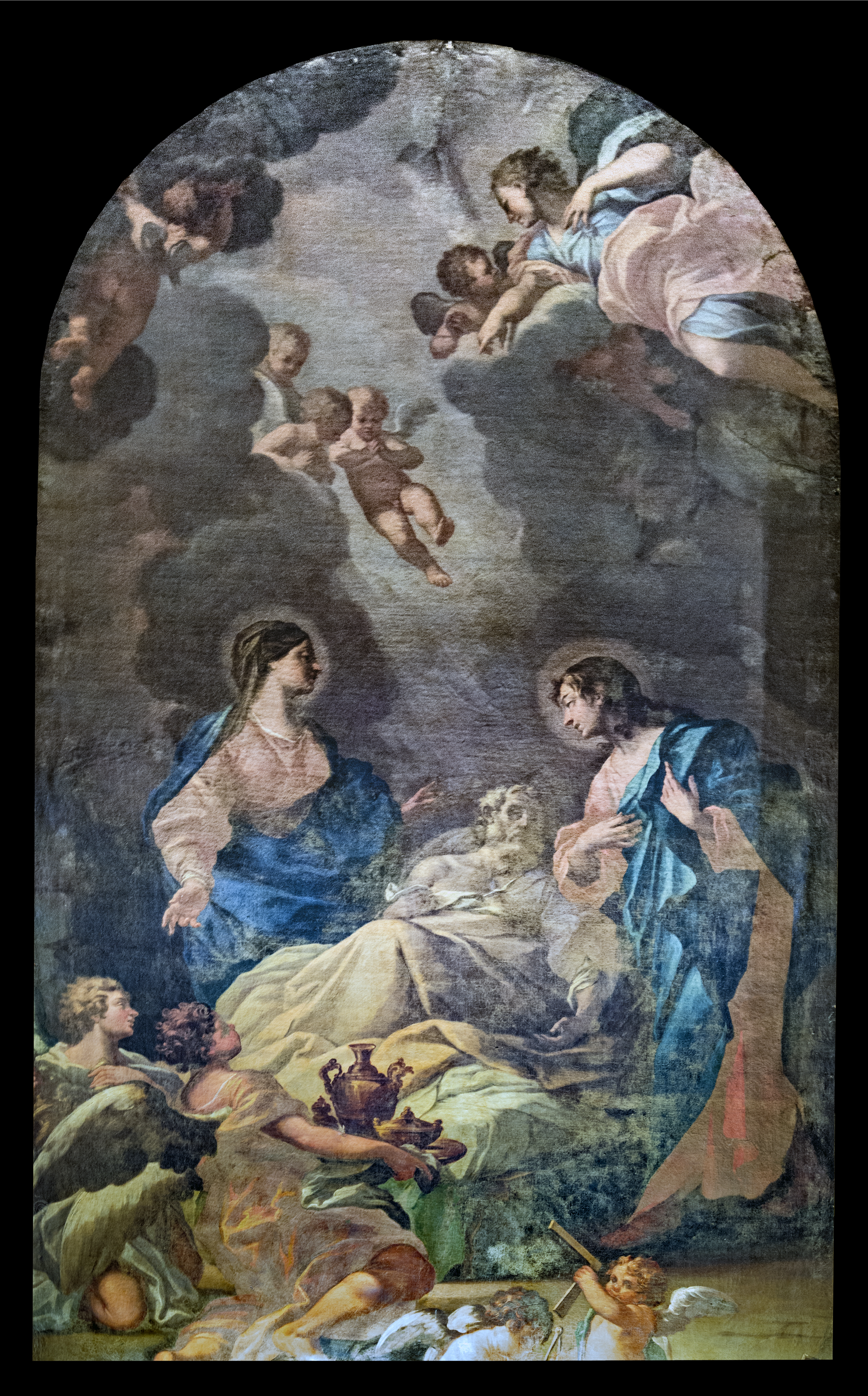
Death of Joseph by Domenico Clavarino.

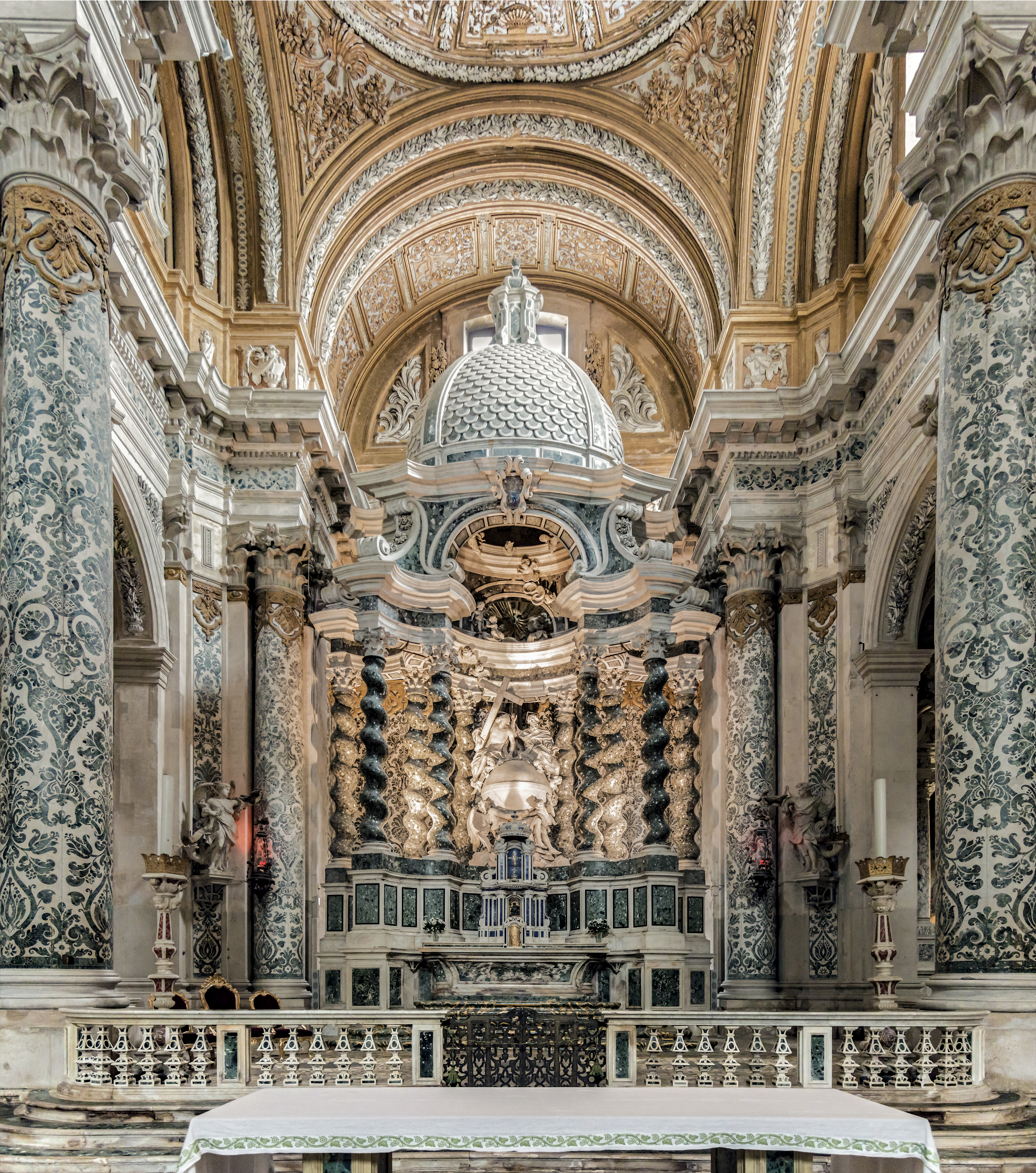
High altar

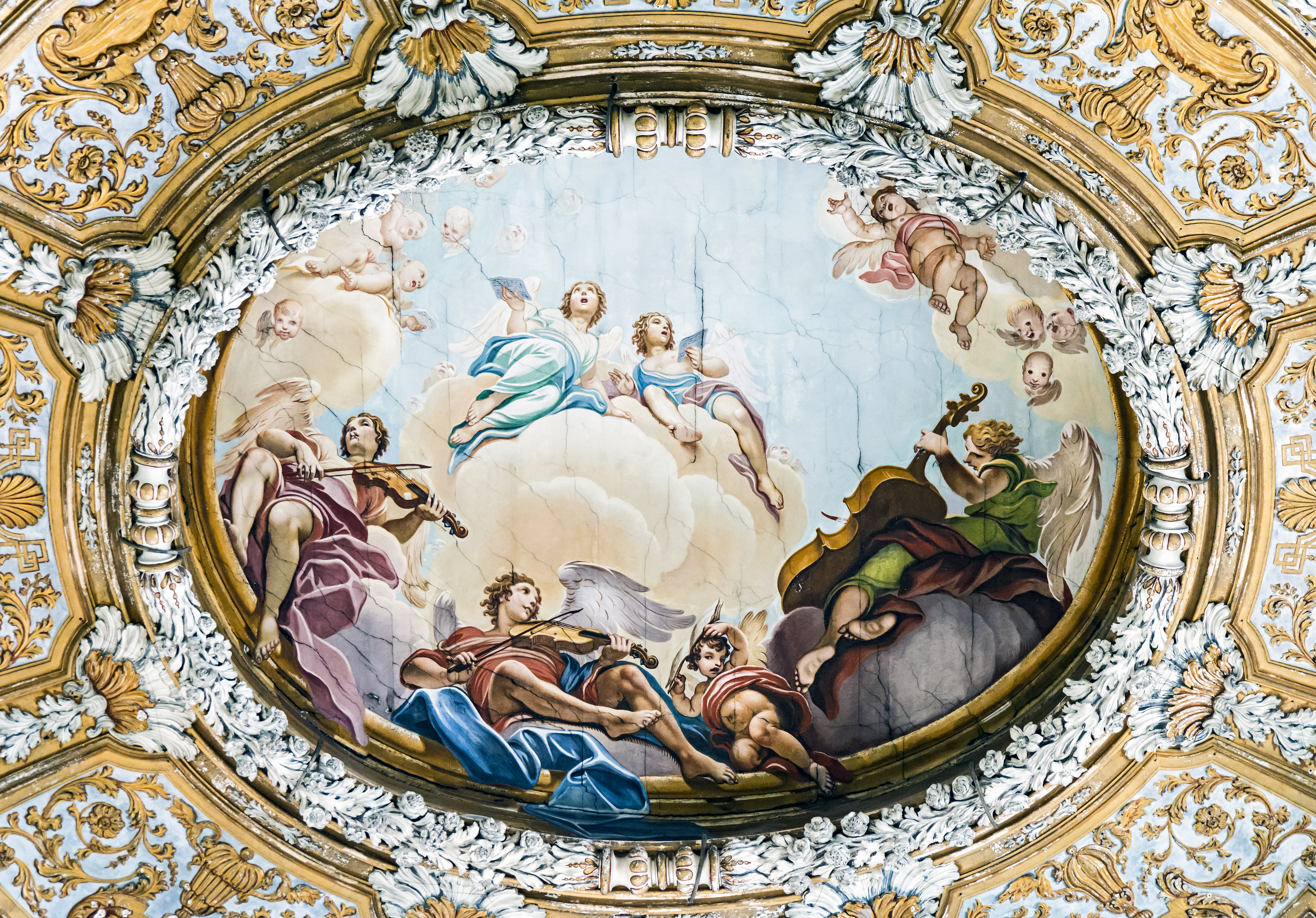
Angels musicians in glory by Louis Dorigny

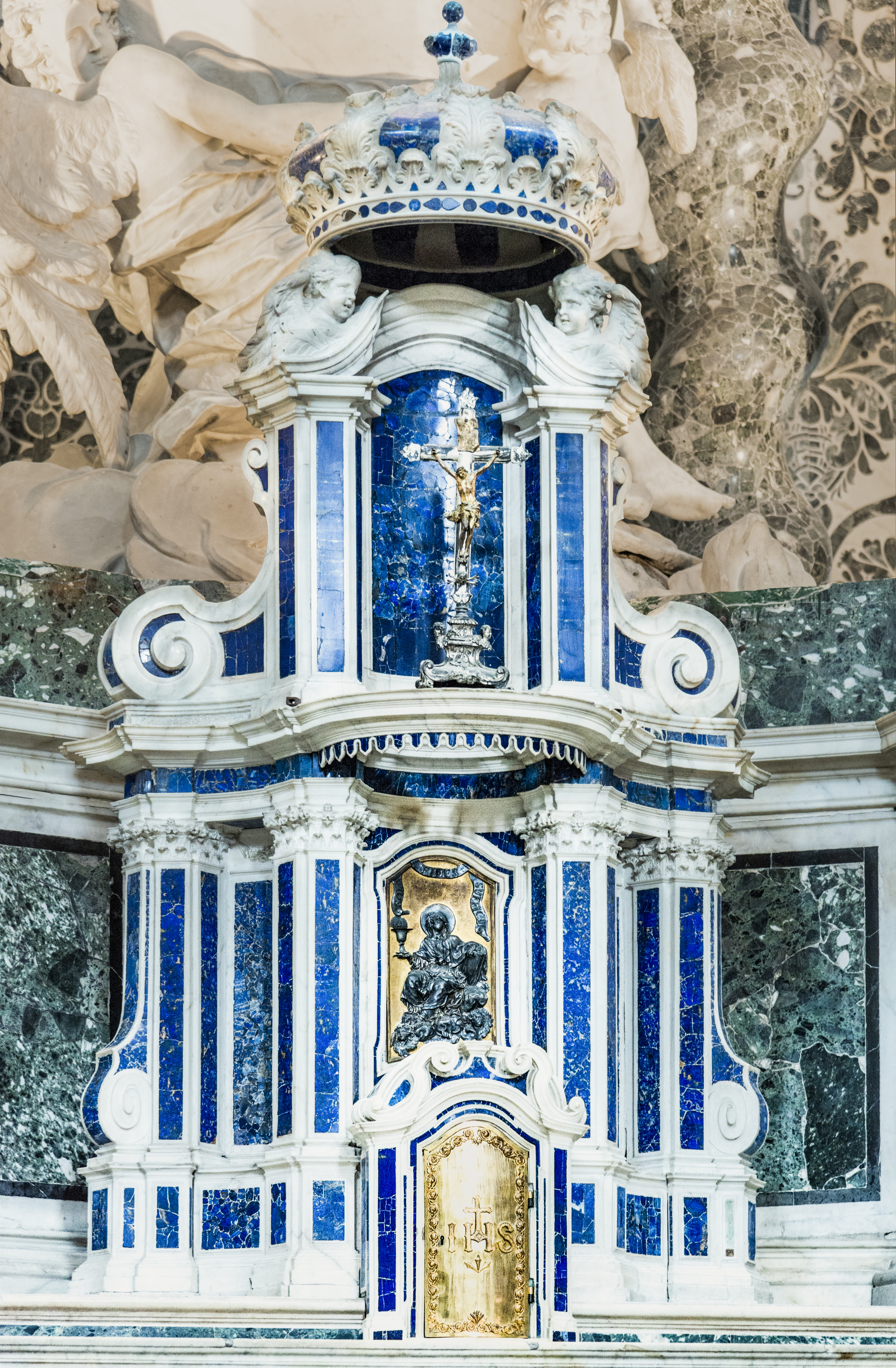
Tabernacle by Giuseppe Pozzo

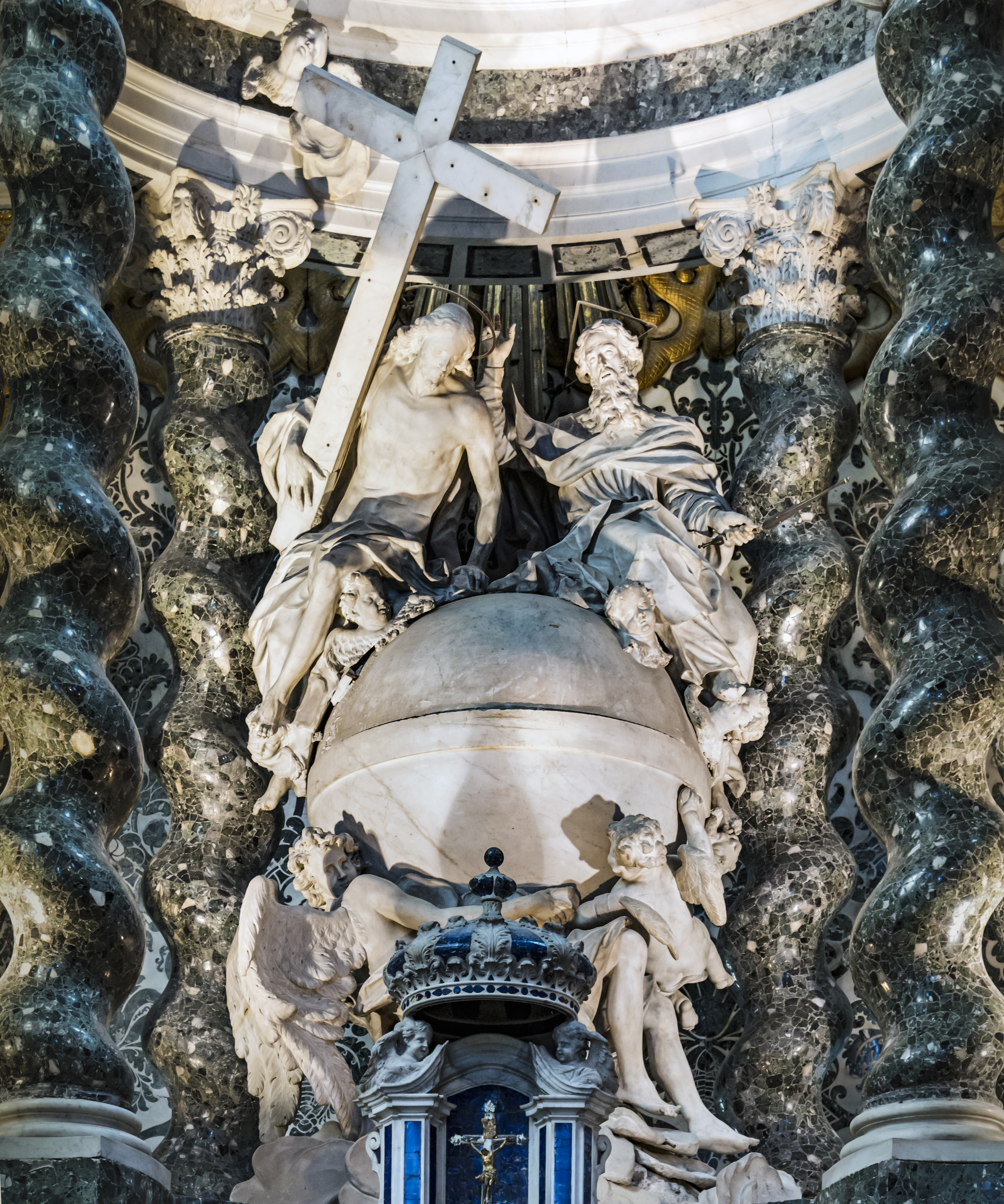
sufficit sola fide by Giuseppe Torretti

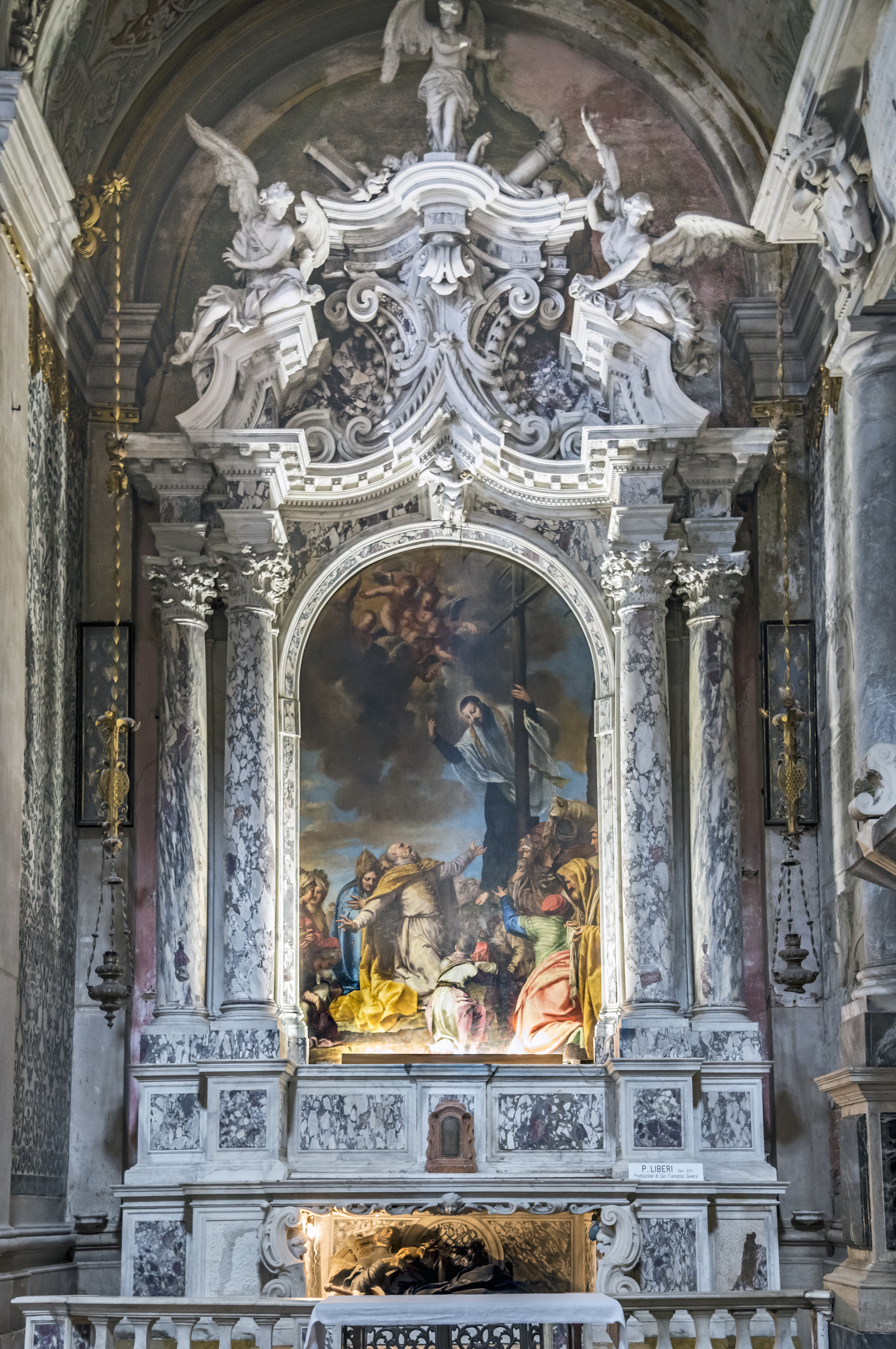
chapel to Saint Francis Xavier

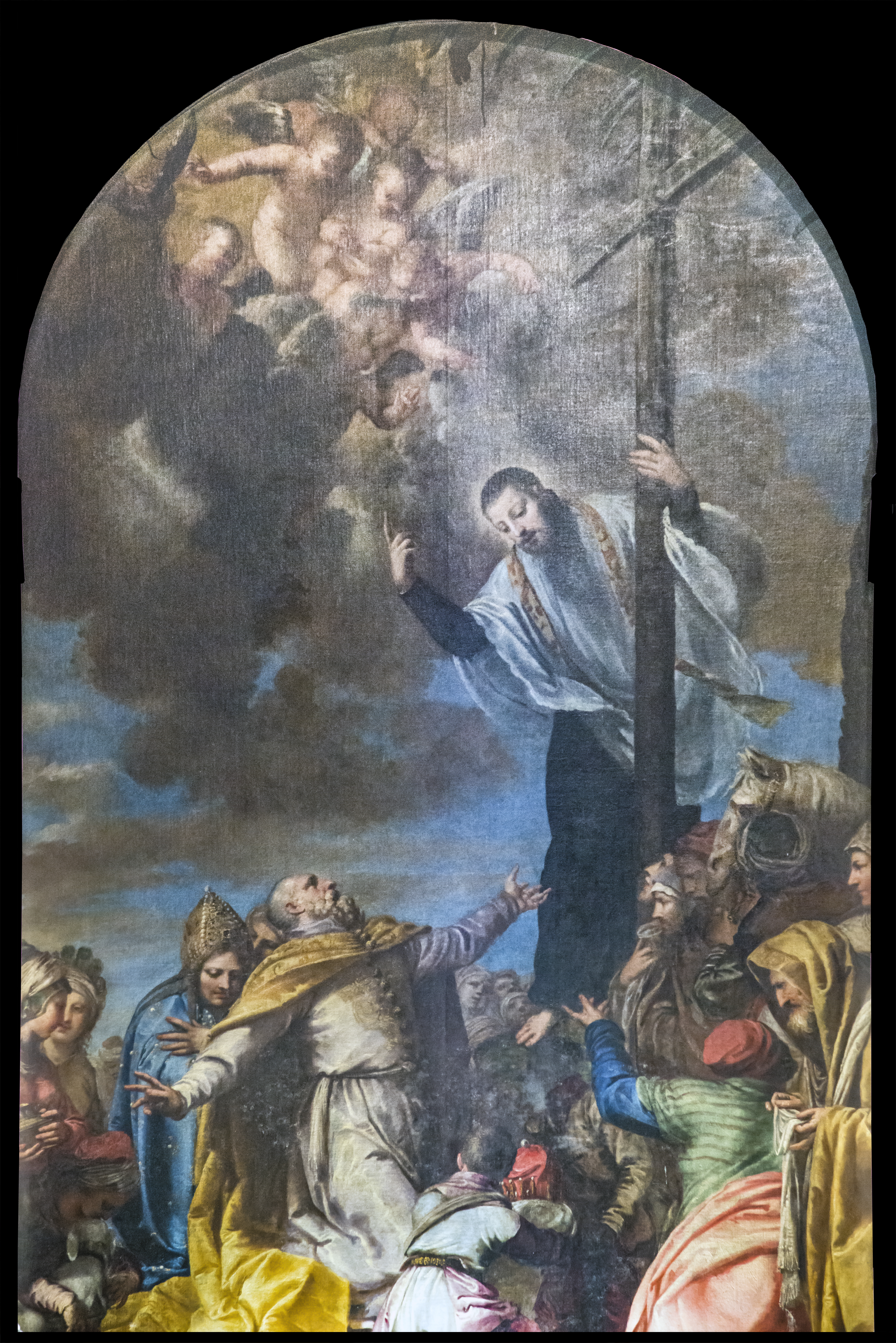
Saint Francis Xavier who preaches in the Orient

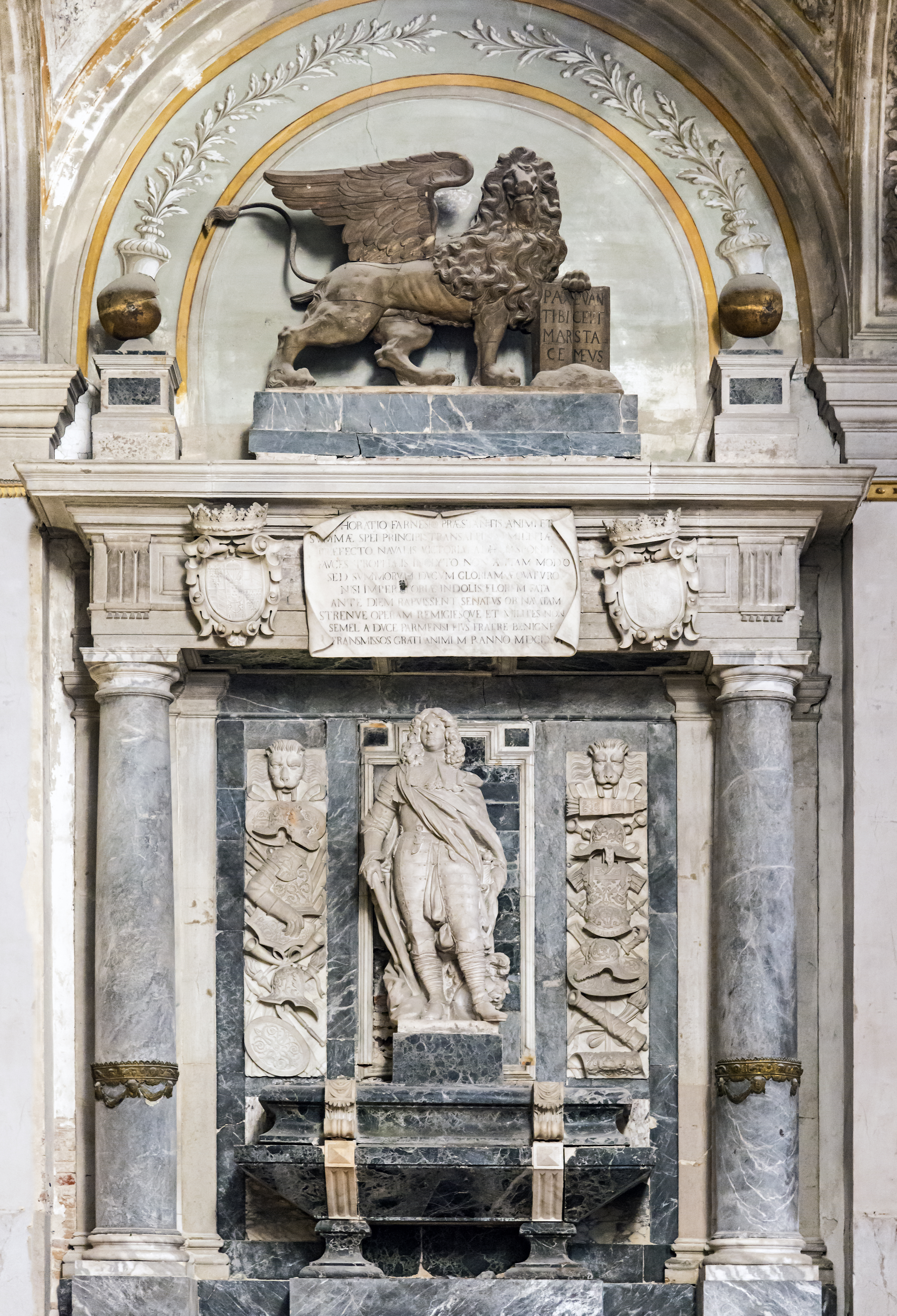
Monument to Orazio Farnses

=== Right side of the nave ===
The chapel of the three Jesuits
The third chapel: The table by Antonio Balestra shows the Holy Spirit, the Virgin, St. Mark and the Jesuits: Saints Stanislas Kostka, Louis of Gonzague and Francis Borgia. The crowns around the three saints symbolize their refusal of the earthly power. The allegories carved above the altar depict humility, sitting with the lamb on his knees; Charity and in the middle of the image of the righteous and blessed soul.
The Chapel of St. Barbara (Second Chapel)
On the altar the statue of St. Barbara by Giovanni Maria Morlaiter. The chapel was that of the schola dei sartori, which already had a chapel in the old church of Crosechieri. The scissors, symbols of the school, are engraved on the balustrade and the return of the lintels.
The Chapel of the Guardian Angel (First Chapel)
Attributed to the schola dei testori de pani de seda ( o samiteri ) (Weavers of heavy and precious decorative fabrics of silk and gold threads). The painting of the altarpiece "Angelo Custode ed angeli che trasportano animates" by Palma il Giovanne (about 1619).

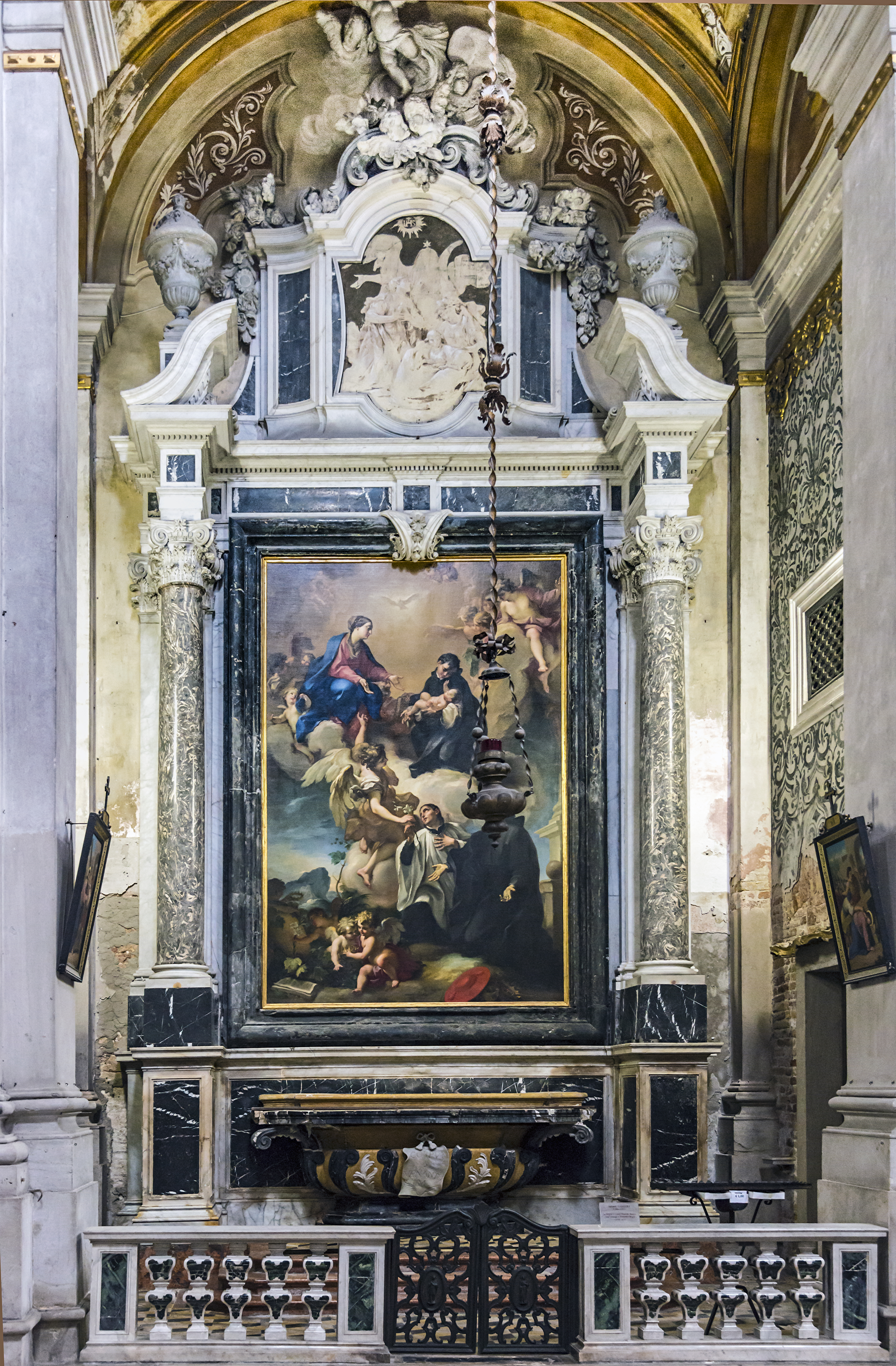
The chapel of the three Jesuits

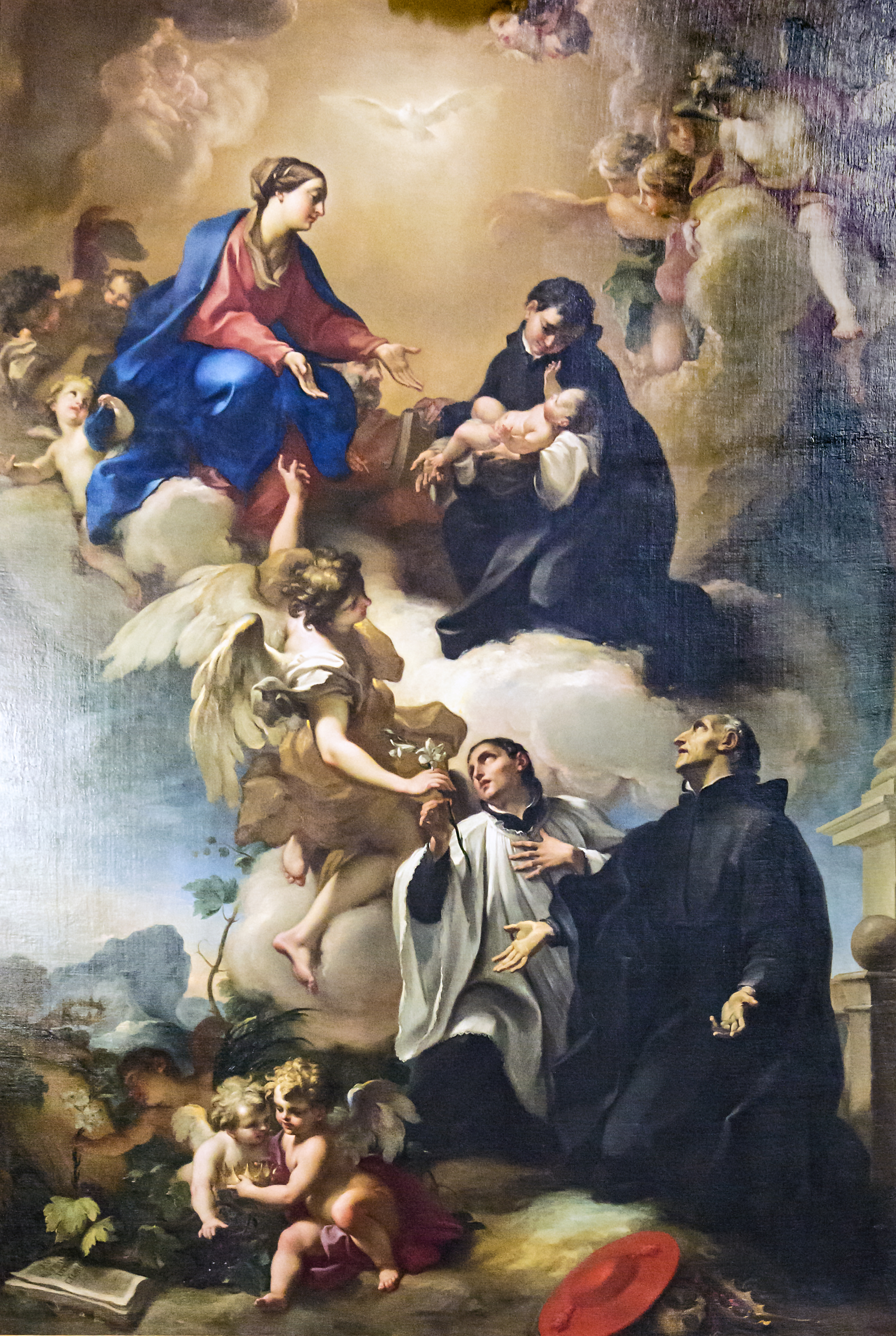
Vergine e i santi Stanislao Kostka, Luigi Gonzaga e Francesco Borgia by Antonio Balestra

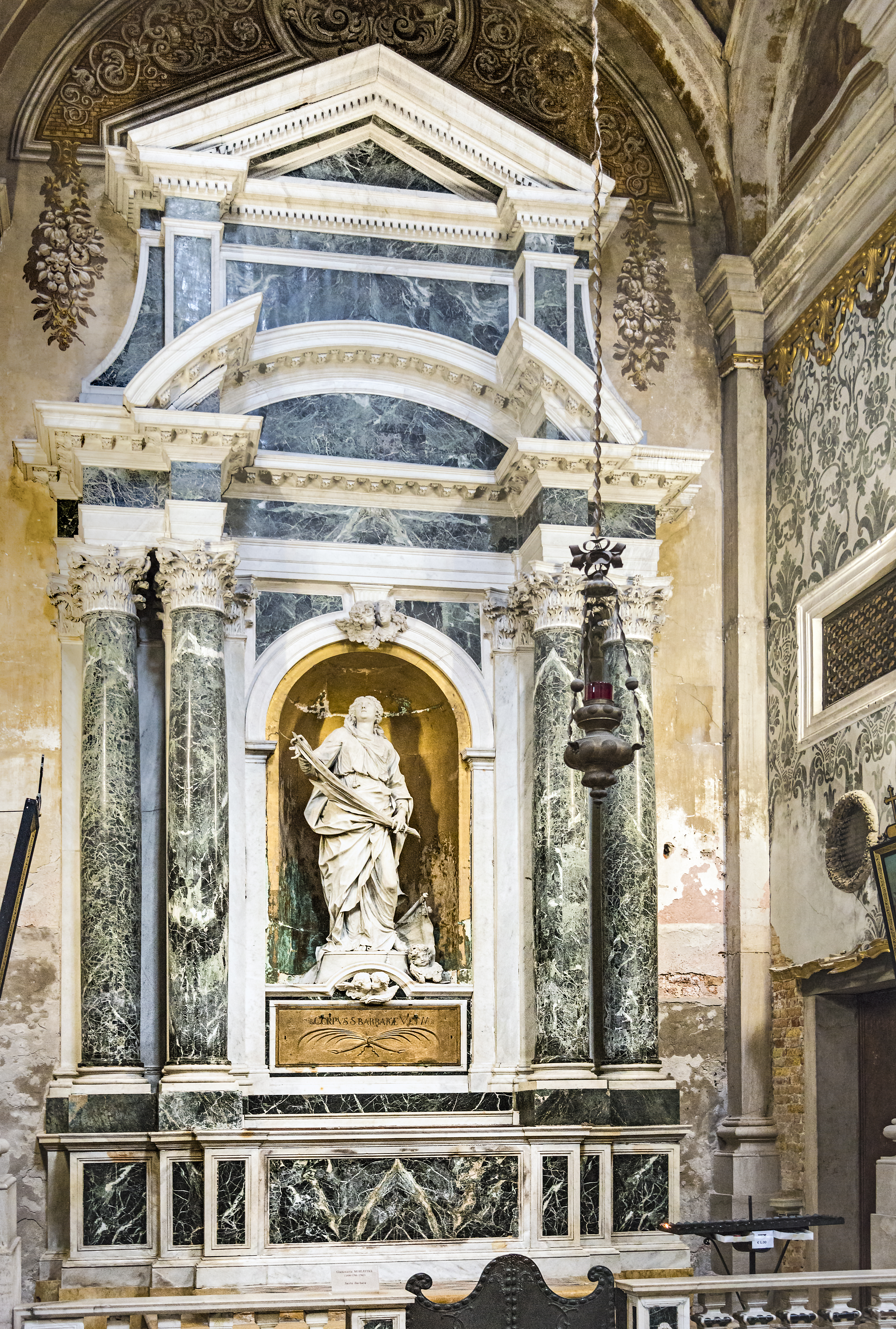
The Chapel of St. Barbara

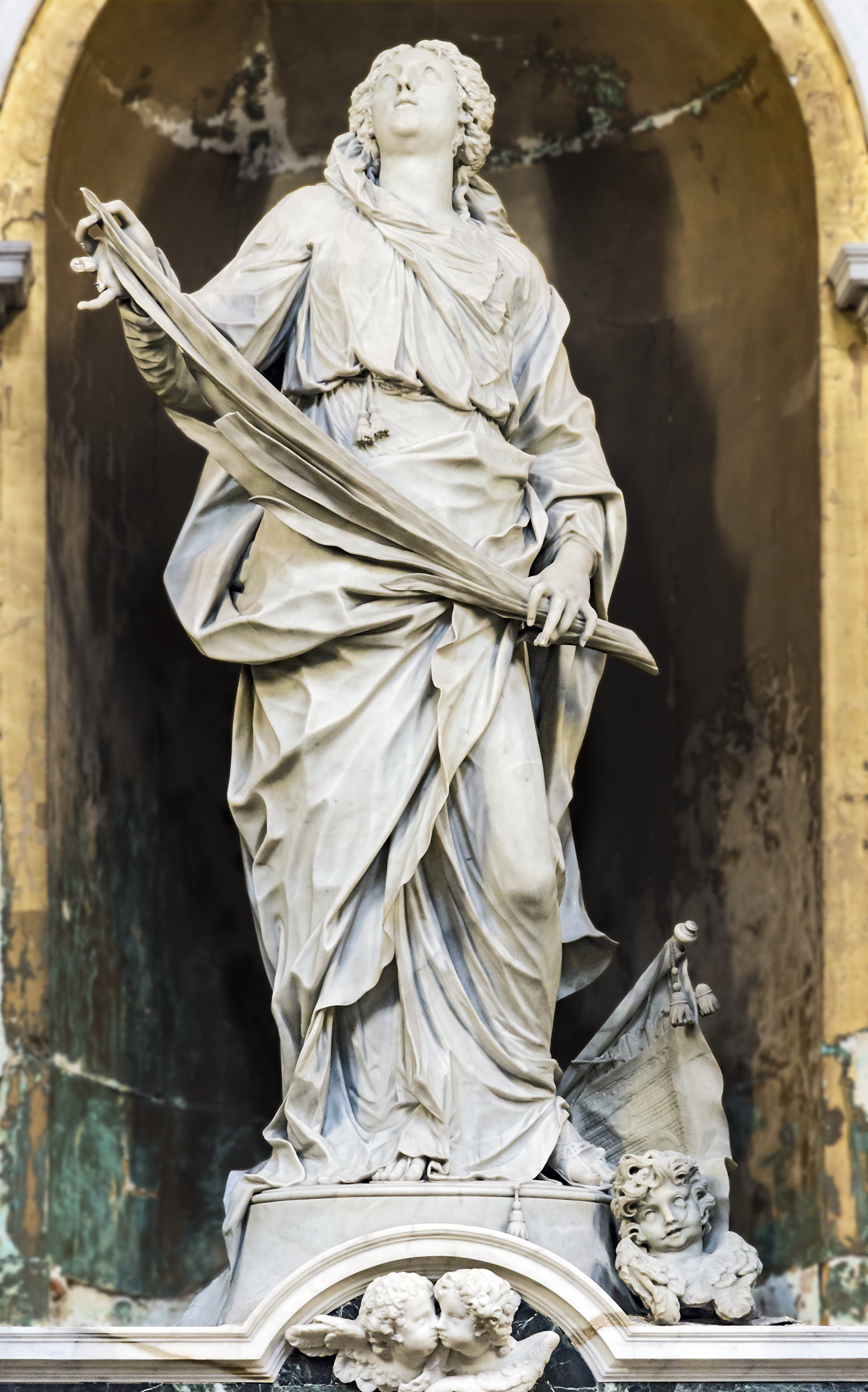
St. Barbara by Giovanni Maria Morlaiter

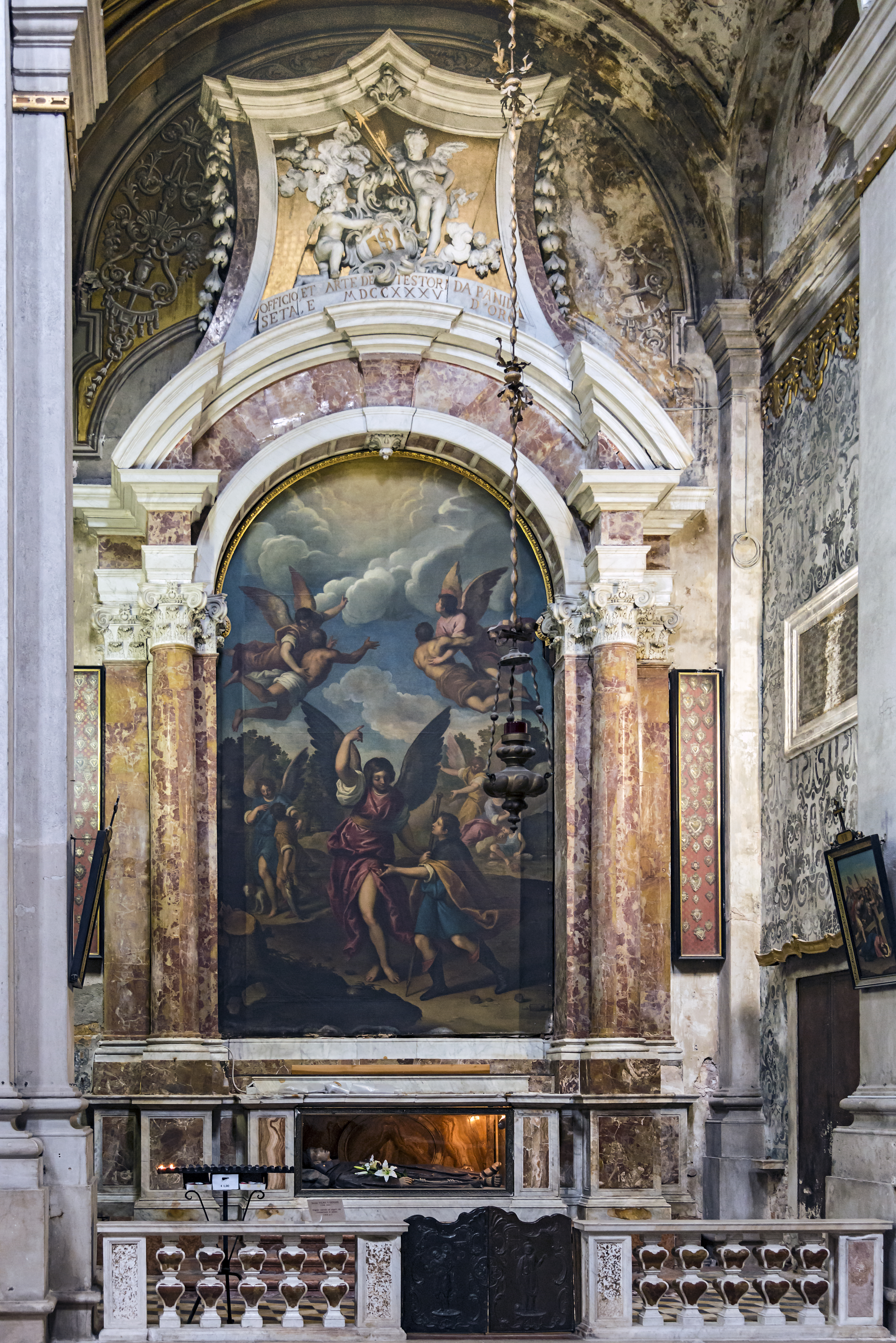
The Chapel of the Guardian Angel

== See also ==
- List of Jesuit sites
