= List of churches in Venice =

Sestieri of Venice: Cannaregio Castello Dorsoduro San Marco San Polo Santa Croce

This is a complete list of churches in Venice classified by "sestiere" in which the city is divided. These are Cannaregio, San Polo, Dorsoduro (including the Giudecca and Isola Sacca Fisola), Santa Croce, San Marco (including San Giorgio Maggiore) and Castello (including San Pietro di Castello and Sant'Elena). It also details the churches on the islands outside Venice.

== San Marco ==
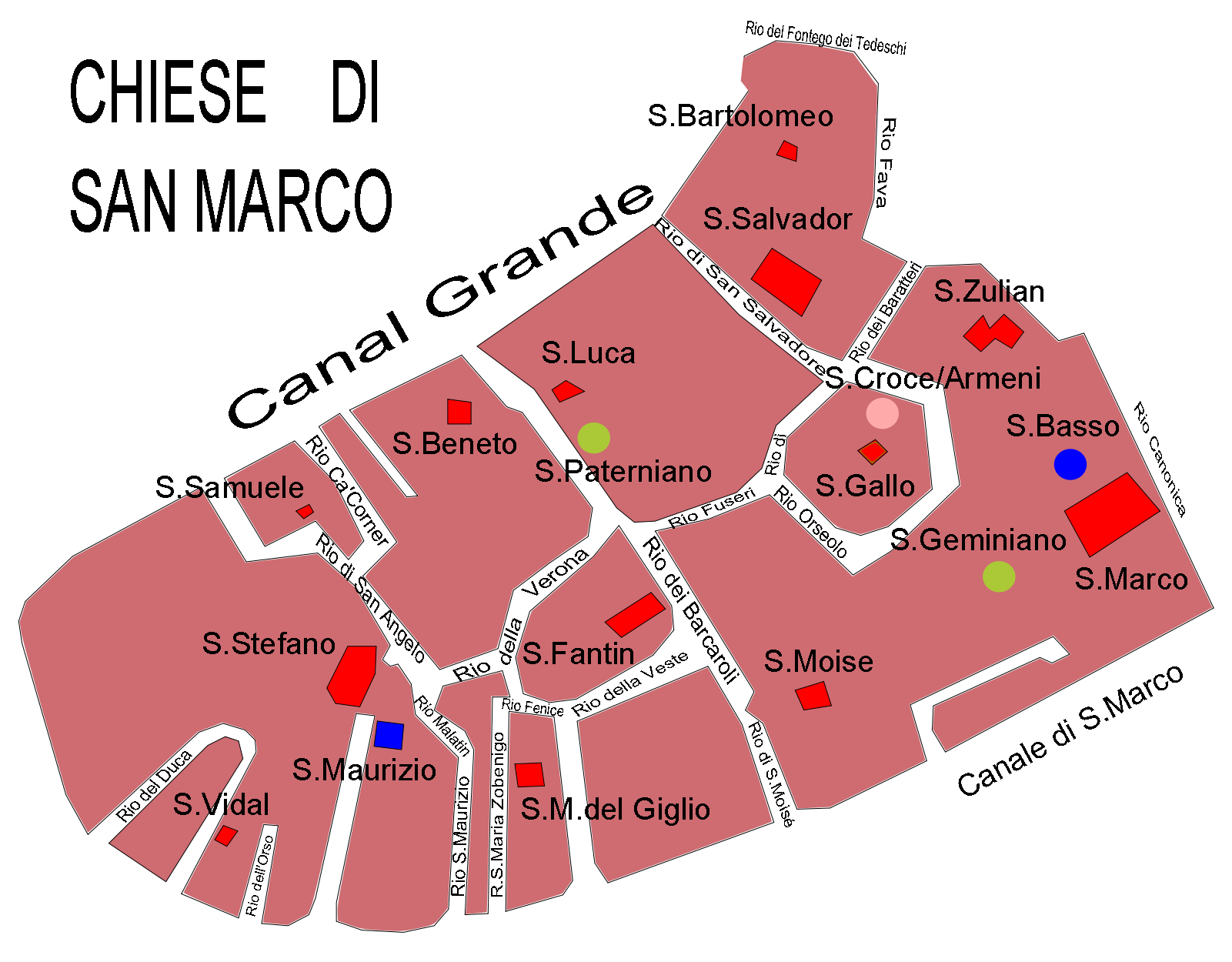

Name	Common name	Affiliation	Significance	Coordinates
Patriarchal Cathedral Basilica of Saint Mark	Saint Mark's Basilica	Roman Catholic	Cathedral church of the Roman Catholic Archdiocese of Venice, situated on Piazza San Marco, example of Byzantine architecture	45°26′4.2″N 12°20′22.56″E
San Bartolomeo		Roman Catholic		45°26′15.25″N 12°20′11.17″E
San Basso		Deconsecrated		45°26′5.9″N 12°20′21.4″E
San Benedetto	San Beneto	Roman Catholic		45°26′8.28″N 12°19′56.58″E
Santa Croce degli Armeni		Armenian Catholic		45°26′7.8″N 12°20′15.8″E
San Fantin		Roman Catholic		45°26′1.9″N 12°20′3.18″E
San Gallo, Venice		Roman Catholic		45°26′3.84″N 12°20′12.84″E
San Giuliano	San Zulian	Roman Catholic		45°26′8.5″N 12°20′19.2″E
San Luca Evangelista	San Luca	Roman Catholic		45°26′8.72″N 12°20′1.49″E
Santa Maria del Giglio	Santa Maria Zobenigo	Roman Catholic		45°25′57″N 12°19′58″E
San Maurizio		Deconsecrated		45°25′58.97″N 12°19′53.65″E
San Moisè		Roman Catholic		45°25′59″N 12°20′10″E
San Salvatore	San Salvador	Roman Catholic		45°26′11.76″N 12°20′11.4″E
San Samuele		Roman Catholic		45°26′01″N 12°19′41″E
Santo Stefano		Roman Catholic		45°25′59.44″N 12°19′48.68″E
San Vidal		Deconsecrated		45°25′56.74″N 12°19′46.24″E
Basilica di San Giorgio Maggiore		Roman Catholic		45°25′45.48″N 12°20′35.16″E

== San Polo ==
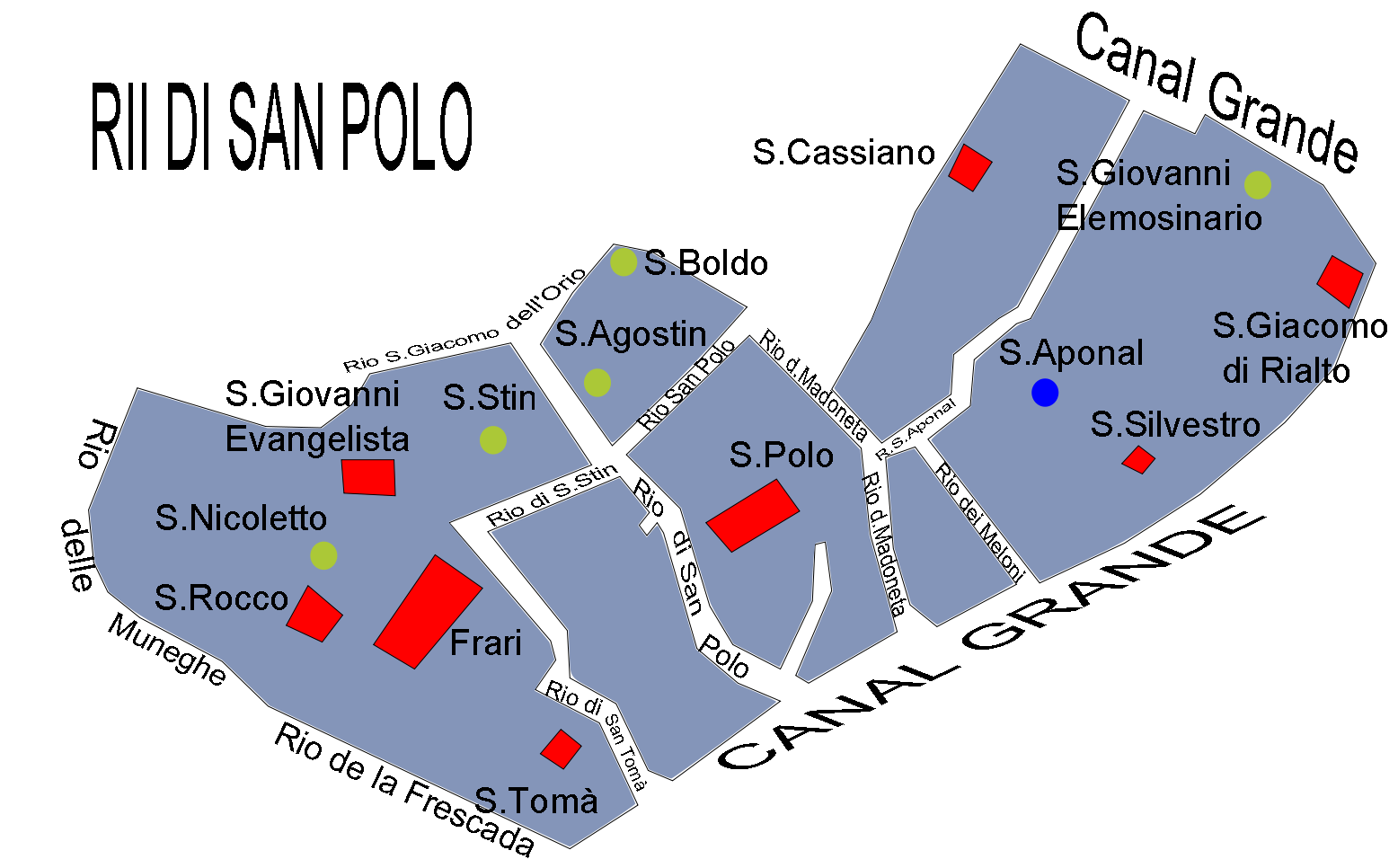

Name	Common name	Affiliation	Significance	Coordinates
Santa Maria Gloriosa dei Frari	The Frari	Roman Catholic		45°26′12″N 12°19′34″E
Sant'Aponal		Deconsecrated		45°26′17″N 12°19′55″E
San Cassiano		Roman Catholic		45°26′22.83″N 12°19′55.52″E
San Giacomo di Rialto	San Giacometto	Roman Catholic	Possibly the oldest church in Venice	45°26′18.5″N 12°20′7.7″E
San Giovanni Elemosinario		Roman Catholic		45°26′19.57″N 12°20′2.09″E
San Giovanni Evangelista		Roman Catholic		45°26′16.8″N 12°19′33.6″E
San Polo		Roman Catholic		45°26′13.4″N 12°19′47.0″E
San Rocco		Roman Catholic		45°26′13.1″N 12°19′30.94″E
San Silvestro		Roman Catholic		45°26′15″N 12°20′0.29″E
San Tomà		Roman Catholic		45°26′10.21″N 12°19′37.84″E

== Santa Croce ==
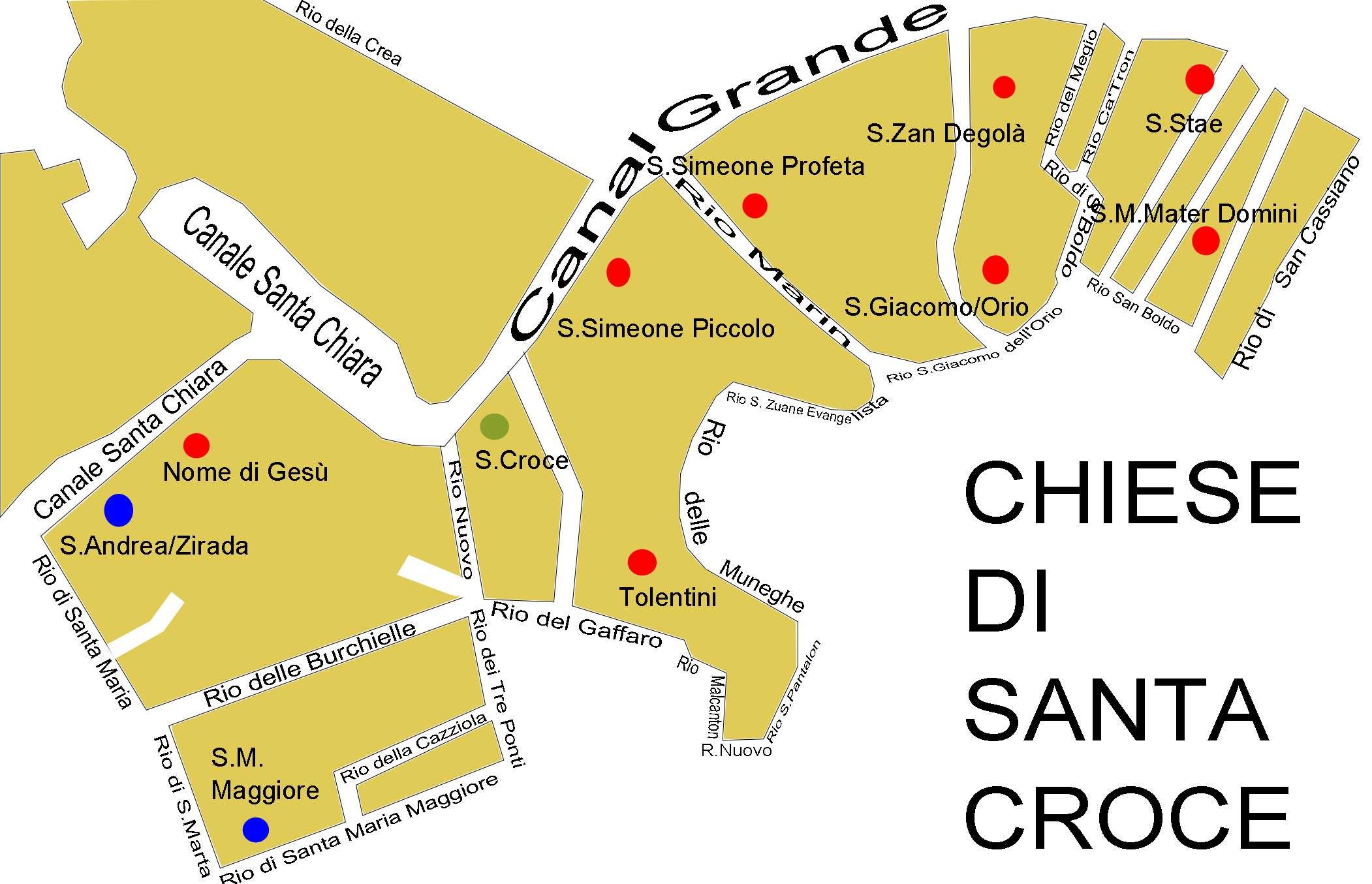

Name	Common name	Affiliation	Significance	Coordinates
Sant'Andrea della Zirada		Roman Catholic		
San Giacomo dall'Orio		Roman Catholic		45°26′24.48″N 12°19′38.65″E
San Giovanni Decollato	San Zan Degolà	Russian Orthodox		45°26′30″N 12°19′40″E
Santa Maria Maggiore, Venice		Deconsecrated		45°26′06.04″N 12°19′0.95″E
Santa Maria Mater Domini		Roman Catholic		45°26′23″N 12°19′49″E
San Nicolò da Tolentino	Tolentini	Roman Catholic		45°26′14.64″N 12°19′19.56″E
Nome di Gesù, Venice		Roman Catholic		
San Simeone Piccolo	San Simeone e Giuda	Roman Catholic	Last church built in Venice;Tridentine Mass celebrated on Sundays.	45°26′24.72″N 12°19′20.64″E
San Simeone Profeta	San Simeone Grande	Roman Catholic		45°26′26.48″N 12°19′28.27″E
San Stae		Roman Catholic		45°26′29″N 12°19′50″E

== Dorsoduro ==
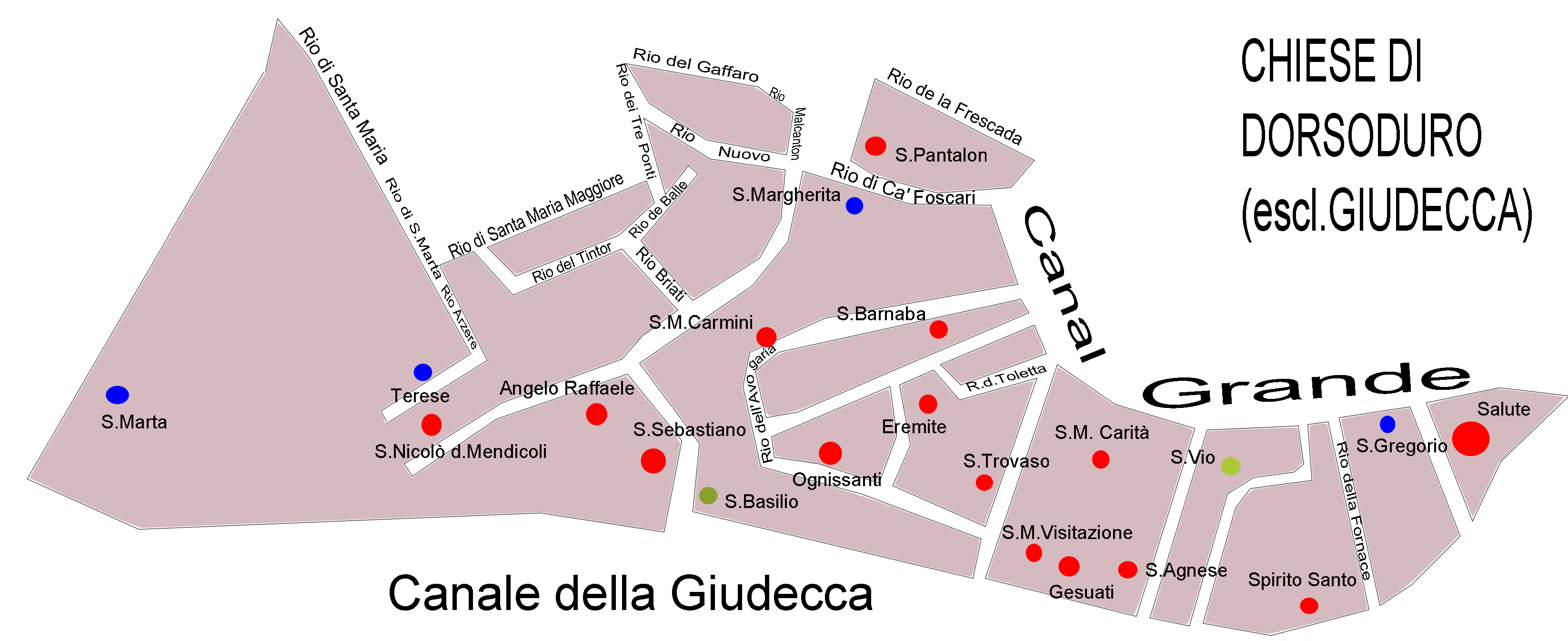

- Basilica di Santa Maria della Salute
- Angelo Raffaele
- Le Eremite
- Gesuati (Santa Maria del Rosario)
- Ognissanti
- Sant'Agnese
- San Barnaba
- St. George's (Anglican)
- San Gregorio (deconsecrated)
- Santa Maria del Carmini
- Santa Maria della Visitazione
- San Nicolò dei Mendicoli
- San Pantalon
- San Sebastiano
- San Trovaso
- Lo Spirito Santo
- Le Terese (deconsecrated)
- Santa Margherita (deconsecrated)
- San Giovanni Battista ai Catecumeni
- Santa Maria della Carità, Venice (deconsecrated)
- Santa Marta, Venice (deconsecrated)
- Santa Maria del Soccorso, Venice (deconsecrated)
- San Vio, Venice (deconsecrated)

=== Giudecca ===
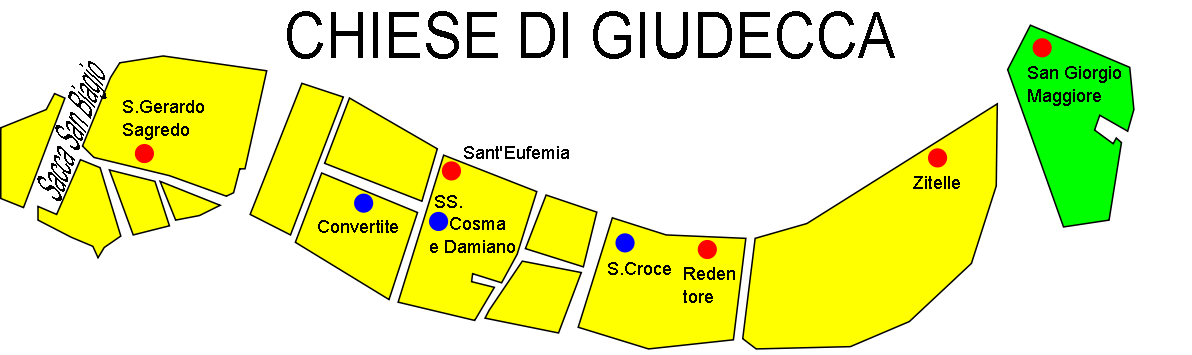

- Il Redentore
- Le Convertite, Venice
- Santi Cosma e Damiano, Venice (deconsecrated)
- Santa Croce (deconsecrated)
- San Gerardo Sagredo
- Sant'Eufemia
- Le Zitelle

== Cannaregio ==
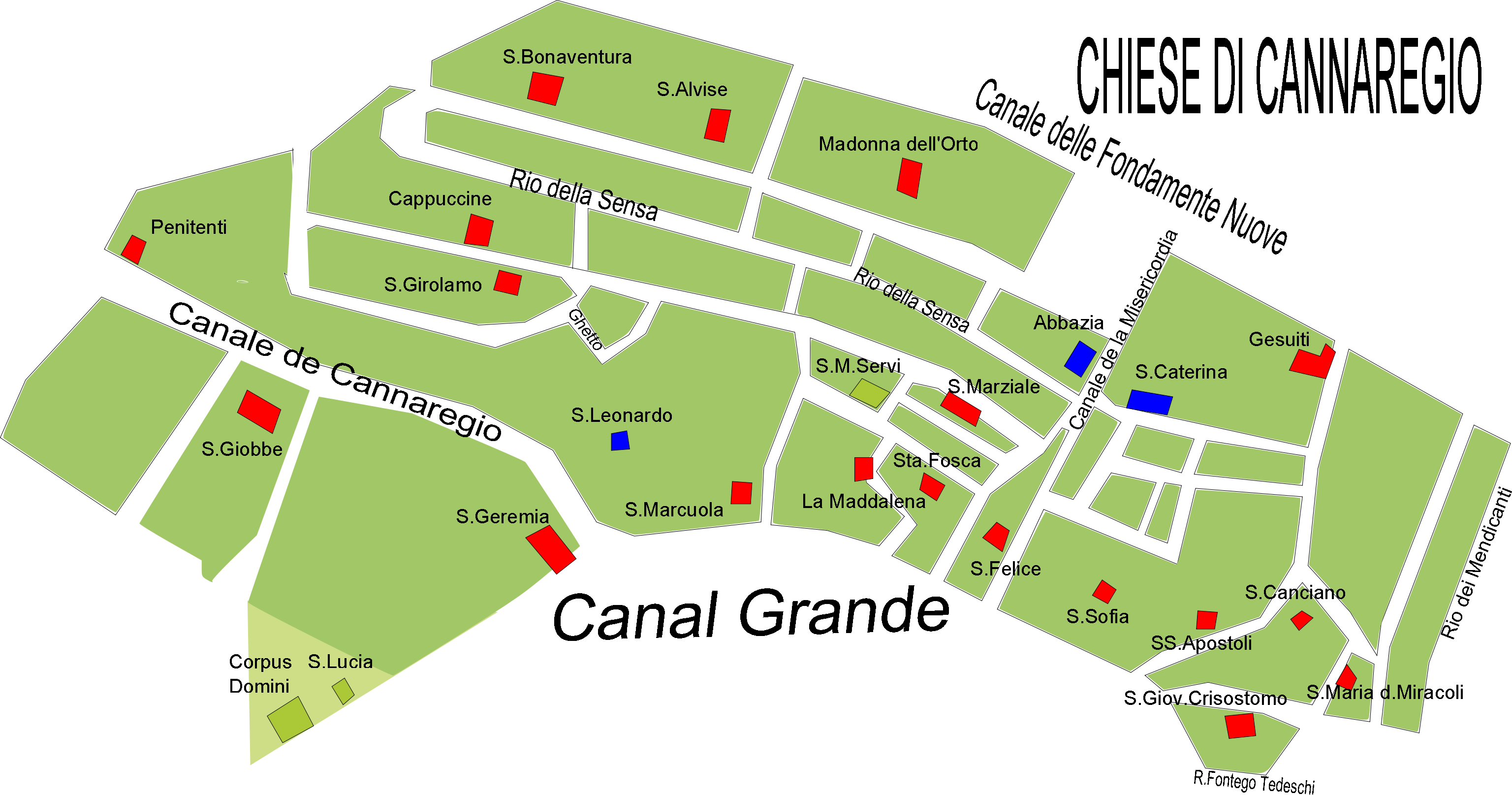

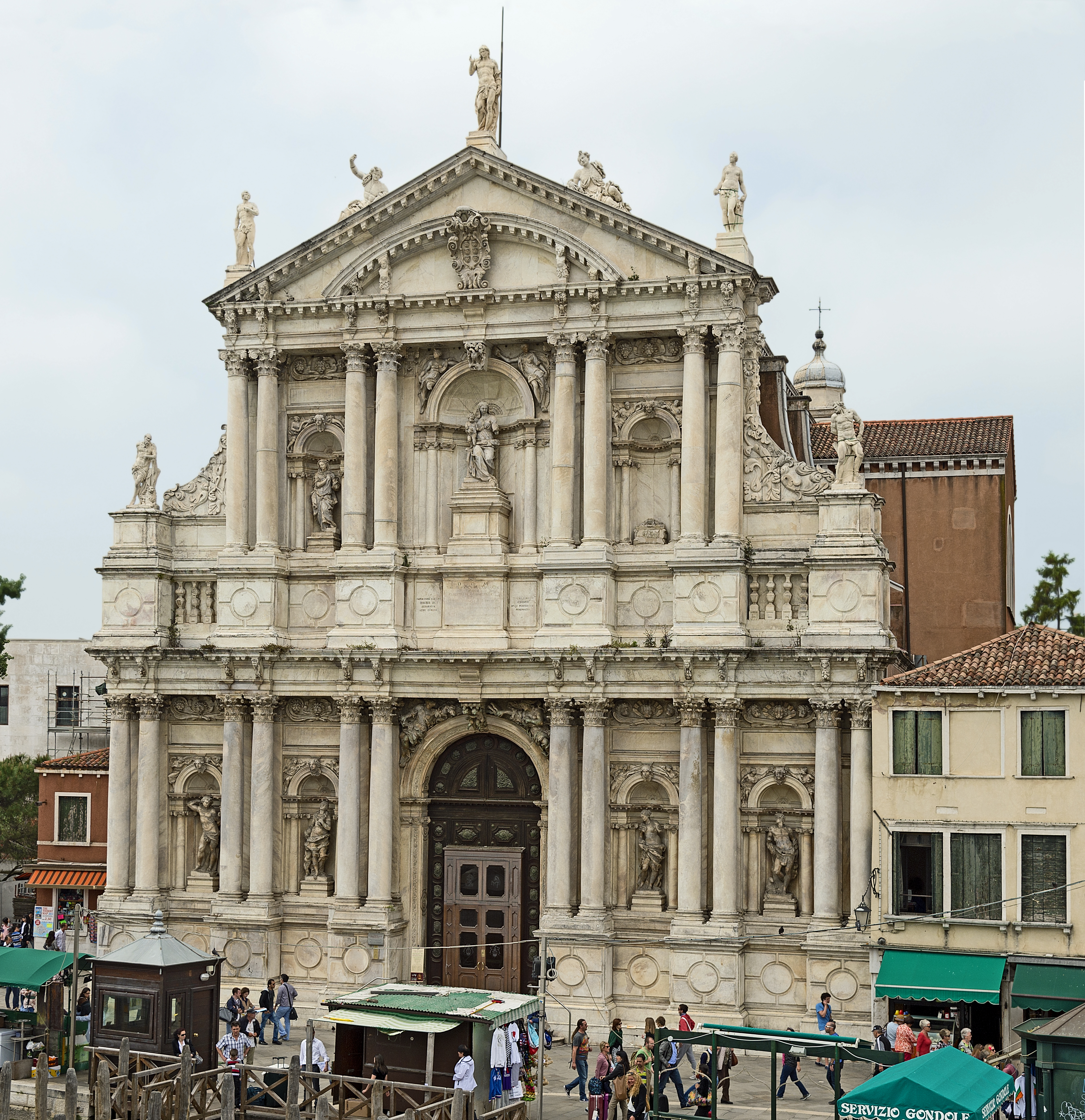
Chiesa degli Scalzi.

- Le Cappuccine
- Corpus Domini (Demolished)
- Gesuiti (Santa Maria Assunta)
- La Maddalena
- Madonna dell'Orto
- Sant'Alvise
- Santi Apostoli
- San Bonaventura, Venice
- San Canciano
- Santa Caterina (deconsecrated)
- San Felice
- Santa Fosca
- San Geremia
- San Giobbe
- San Giovanni Crisostomo
- San Girolamo, Cannaregio
- San Leonardo
- Chiesa Luterana (Lutheran)
- San Marcuola
- Santa Maria dei Miracoli
- Santa Maria dei Servi (destroyed)
- Santa Maria della Misericordia (deconsecrated)
- Santa Maria delle Penitenti
- San Marziale
- Santa Sofia
- Scalzi (Santa Maria di Nazareth)

== Castello ==
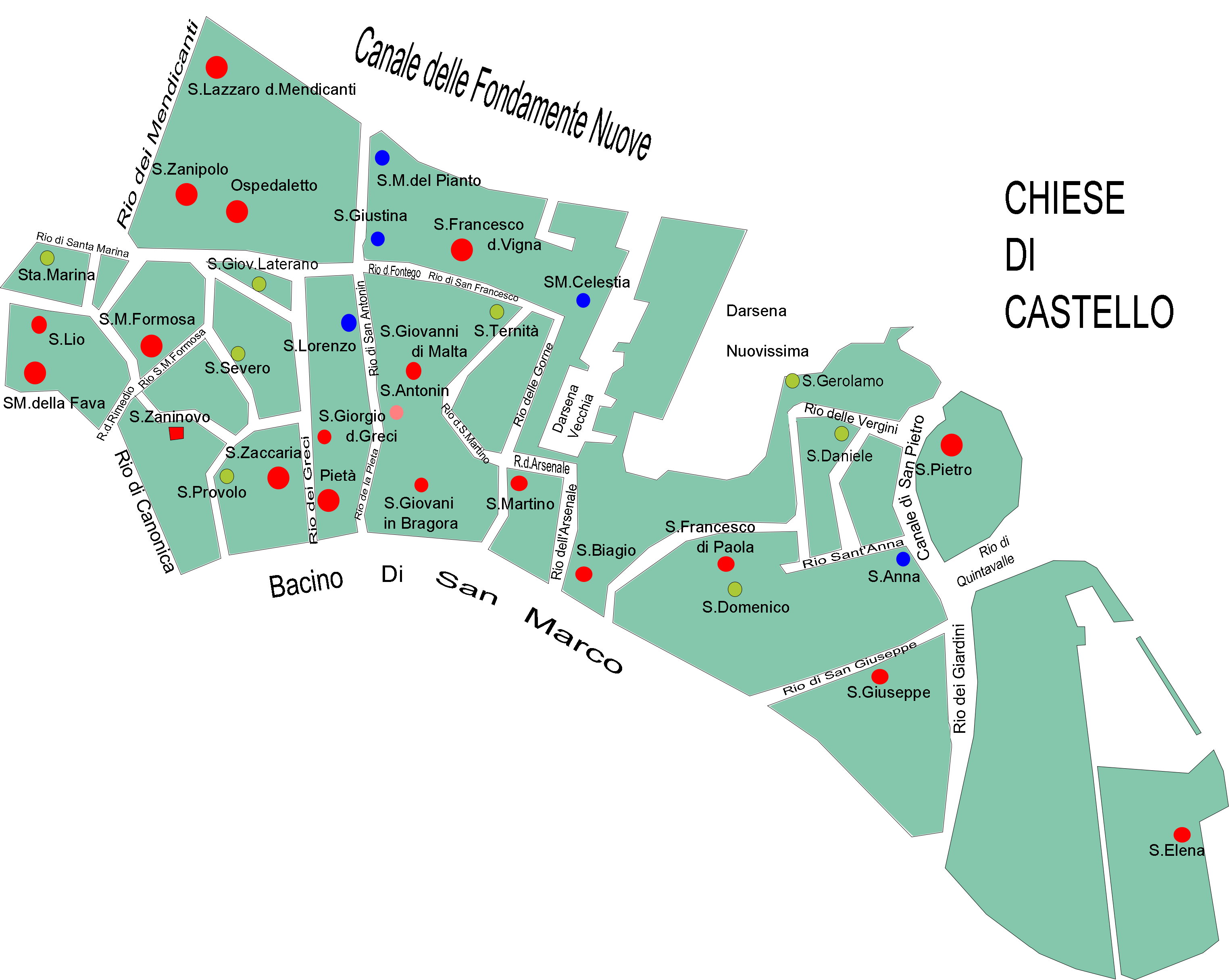

- Basilica di San Zanipolo
- Ospedaletto
- Sant'Anna (deconsecrated)
- Sant'Antonin
- San Biagio
- Cristo Re, Venice
- San Domenico di Castello (destroyed)
- Sant'Elena
- San Francesco di Paola
- San Francesco della Vigna
- San Giorgio dei Greci (Greek Orthodox)
- San Giovanni di Malta
- San Giovanni in Bragora
- San Giovanni Nuovo
- San Giuseppe di Castello
- Santa Giustina (deconsecrated)
- San Lazzaro dei Mendicanti
- San Lio
- San Lorenzo (deconsecrated)
- Santa Maria Ausiliatrice, Venice (deconsecrated)
- Santa Maria della Fava
- Santa Maria Formosa
- Santa Maria del Pianto (closed)
- Santa Maria della Pietà
- San Martino
- San Niccolo di Bari (destroyed)
- San Pietro di Castello
- San Zaccaria

== Islands ==
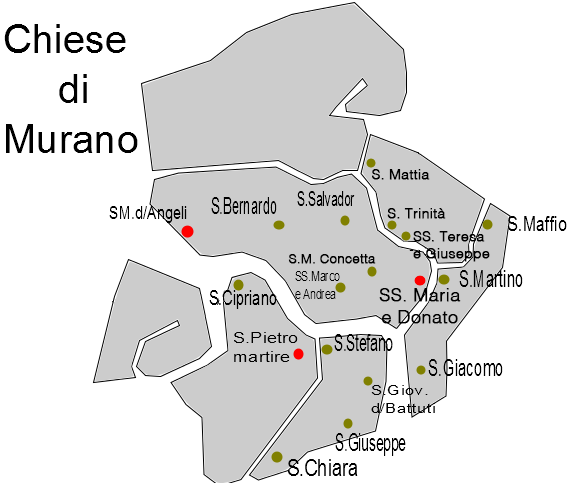

Santa Fosca di Torcello.

San Martino Church in Burano.

=== San Michele ===
- San Cristoforo
- San Michele in Isola

=== Murano ===
- Basilica di Santi Maria e Donato
- Santa Maria degli Angeli
- San Pietro Martire

=== Burano ===
- San Martino

=== Mazzorbo ===
- Santa Caterina
- Santa Maria Valverde (destroyed)

=== Torcello ===
- Basilica di Santa Maria Assunta
- Santa Fosca

=== San Francesco del Deserto ===
- San Francesco del Deserto

=== Lido ===
- Santa Maria Elisabetta
- San Nicolò al Lido

=== San Lazzaro degli Armeni ===
- San Lazzaro degli Armeni (Armenian Catholic)
