= Ignazio Agliaudo =

Italian painter (active c. 1723 - 1737)

Ignazio Agliaudo (1701 - 1769, active 1723 - 1737) was an Italian architect and veduta painter. The Treccani lists his year of birth as 1701 and year of death as 1769.

Very little is known of Agliaudo's life. He was a Spaniard by birth, and was living in Turin in 1737. He is primarily known from surviving works documenting that he collaborated with other architects to produce decorations in celebration of the marriage between Charles Emmanuel III of Sardinia and Elisabeth Therese of Lorraine. For this project, he collaborated with fr:Georg Caspar Prenner, Bernardo Antonio Vittone, Giovanni Battista Borra, Giuseppe Bernardi, fr:Antoine Hérisset, it:Filippo Giovanni Battista Nicolis di Robilant among other artists.

He has also been titled Ignazio Agliaudo di Tavigliano, a reference to his family being the hereditary counts of Tavigliano. Using this name, Ignazio was credited for building the Oratory adjoining the it:Chiesa di San Filippo Neri in Turin in 1723, based on designs by Filippo Juvarra. He is also credited for building the it:Chiesa della Madonna del Carmine, also in Turin and based on designs by Filippo Juvarra. For this enedeavor, he collaborated with Francesco Benedetto Ferrogio and it:Ignazio Renato Birago di Borgaro from 1732 to 1736.
