= Torretti =

Torretti is an Italian surname. Notable people with the surname include:

- Giuseppe Torretti (1661–1743), Italian sculptor
- Roberto Torretti (1930–2022), Chilean author, philosopher, and academic
- Talisa Torretti (born 2003), Italian rhythmic gymnast
