= Santi Biagio e Cataldo =

Church in Venice, Italy

Coordinates: 45.4279°N 12.3194°E

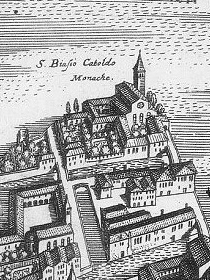
The church on Matthaeus Merian's 1635 map of the city.

Santi Biagio e Cataldo or San Biagio e Cataldo was a church on the western corner of the Giudecca island in Venice, Italy. It was dedicated to saint Blaise and saint Catald.

== History ==
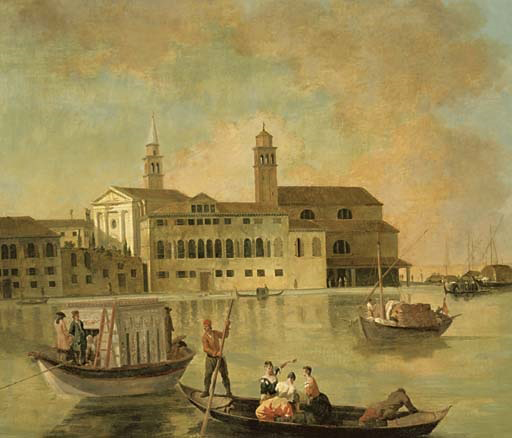
Johan Richter's view of the church, 1725, after the second restoration.

The original building dates back to the end of the 10th century and was consecrated in 1188. In 1222 a monastery was built adjoining it. The church has been restored twice. The first time was a radical restructuring in 1593 by Michele Sanmicheli, demolished the roof of the choir and sending its columns to the nearby church of Sant'Eufemia. Merian's plan of 1635 probably shows the original church prior to that restoration, on a Romanesque three-nave basilica plan with a frontage directly onto the lagoon and a Romanesque belltower with a pyramidal spire.

A second restoration early in the 18th century by Domenico Rossi and Giorgio Massari concentrated on the interior, altars and paintings. Johan Richter's view of the church of 1725 shows it still as a three nave basilica church, with a covered portico along one side - it shows the church from the lagoon and thus gives no evidence for the façade on the landward side. The square belltower with a polygonal spire above the belfry is shown further back than it is in the de Barbari plan, after Sanmicheli's radical restructuring.

The church and its monastery remained active until 1810, when it was suppressed by Napoleonic decree. It was bought by a private owner and initially converted into a hospital complex before being demolished in the second half of the 19th century to make way for the Molino Stucky industrial complex.

== Bibliography ==
- Archivio di Stato di Venezia, ed. (2006). "SS. Biagio e Cataldo della Giudecca (Venezia)". Archived from the original on 18 May 2015.
