= Giovanni Ferrari (sculptor) =

Italian sculptor

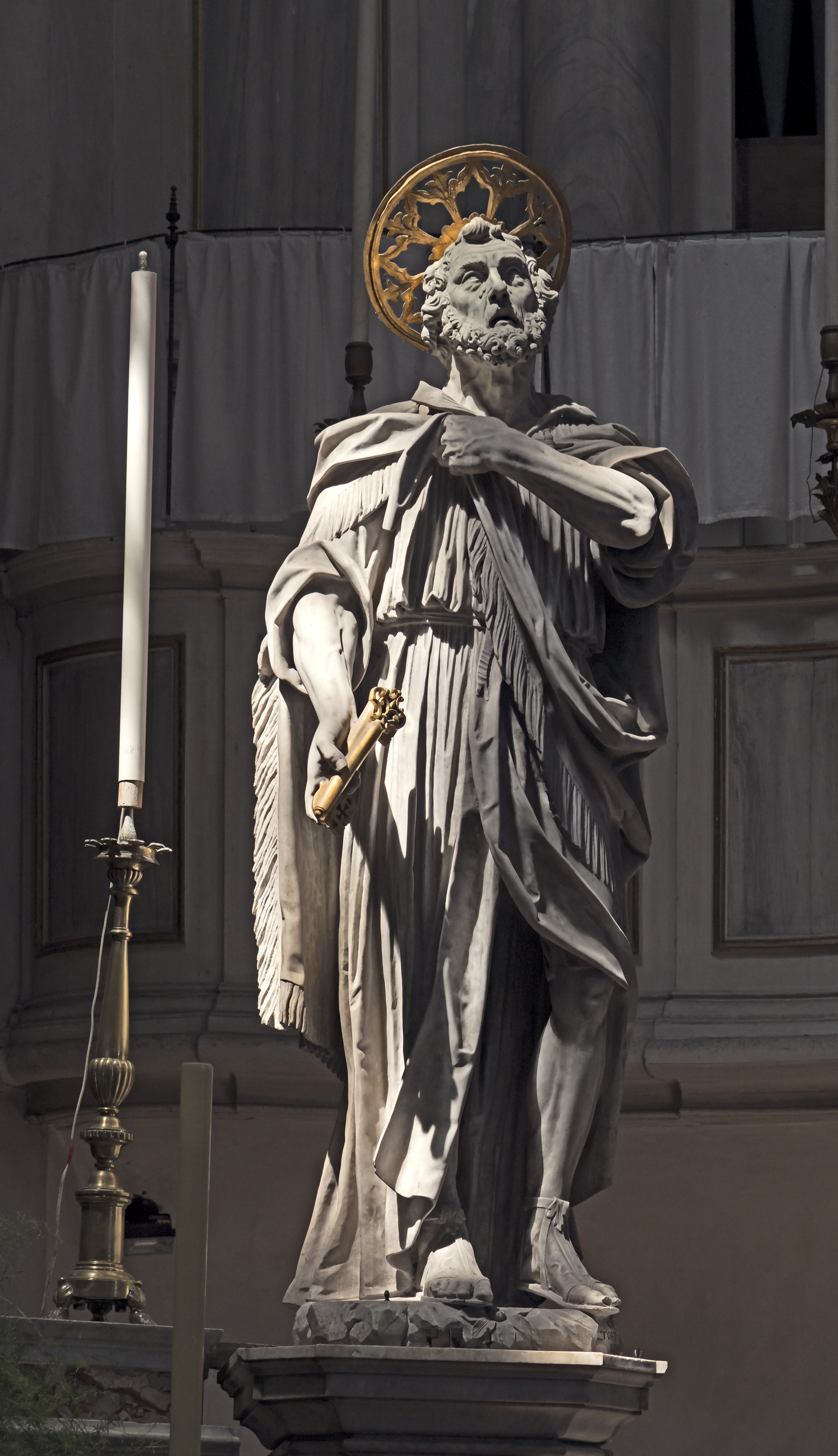
Saint Peter San Geremia in Venice

Giovanni Ferrari detto Torretto (5 June 1744 – 2 November 1826) was an Italian sculptor.

== Biography ==
Giovanni Ferrari was born 5 June 1744, in Crespano del Grappa. His father, Gaetano, was a stonemason by trade. His mother was Domenica Tedesca. He is the last of well-known artist from the Torretti dynasty of sculptors, which including his great-uncle Giuseppe Torretto and Uncle Giuseppe Bernardi. In 1755 he moved to Venice to join the studio of the latter, and at Bernardi's death in 1773, he inherited his studio. He died 2 November 1826 in Venice.

== As sculptor ==
Ferrari was concerned initially to complete some works of his predecessor, helped, among others, by Antonio Canova, who had been working in the shop since 1744. But by 1777, Ferrari closed the studio, and moved to Mantua, then to Modena, then to Bologna. From 1779 he was in Rome where he worked at the studio of Lorenzo Cardelli, and later under Francesco Antonio Franzoni. He then returned to Venice, where he worked till 1796 on 22 of the statues of Prato della Valle in Padua .

For the La Fenice theater (opened in 1792), Ferrari made two statues (Melpomene and Terpsichore) for the facade and helped Giovanni Antonio Moschini complete the bas-reliefs of the interior (only two after the fire of 1837). Shortly afterwards built the monument to Angelo Emo (now preserved in the church of San Biagio), which many consider his masterpiece.

In 1804 he was appointed deputy to the Accademia di Belle Arti in Venice.

Late in his career, he began working for the family Savorgnan (Count Giulio was called "my patron" by the sculptor). Afterwards, the relationship became strained due to missed payments that led Ferrari to go to court.

== Family ==
His son Gaetano (died 1847) also became a sculptor; he trained with Rinaldo Rinaldi and worked with Canova.

== Sources ==
- Treccani encyclopedia entry
