= Museo di Palazzo Mocenigo =

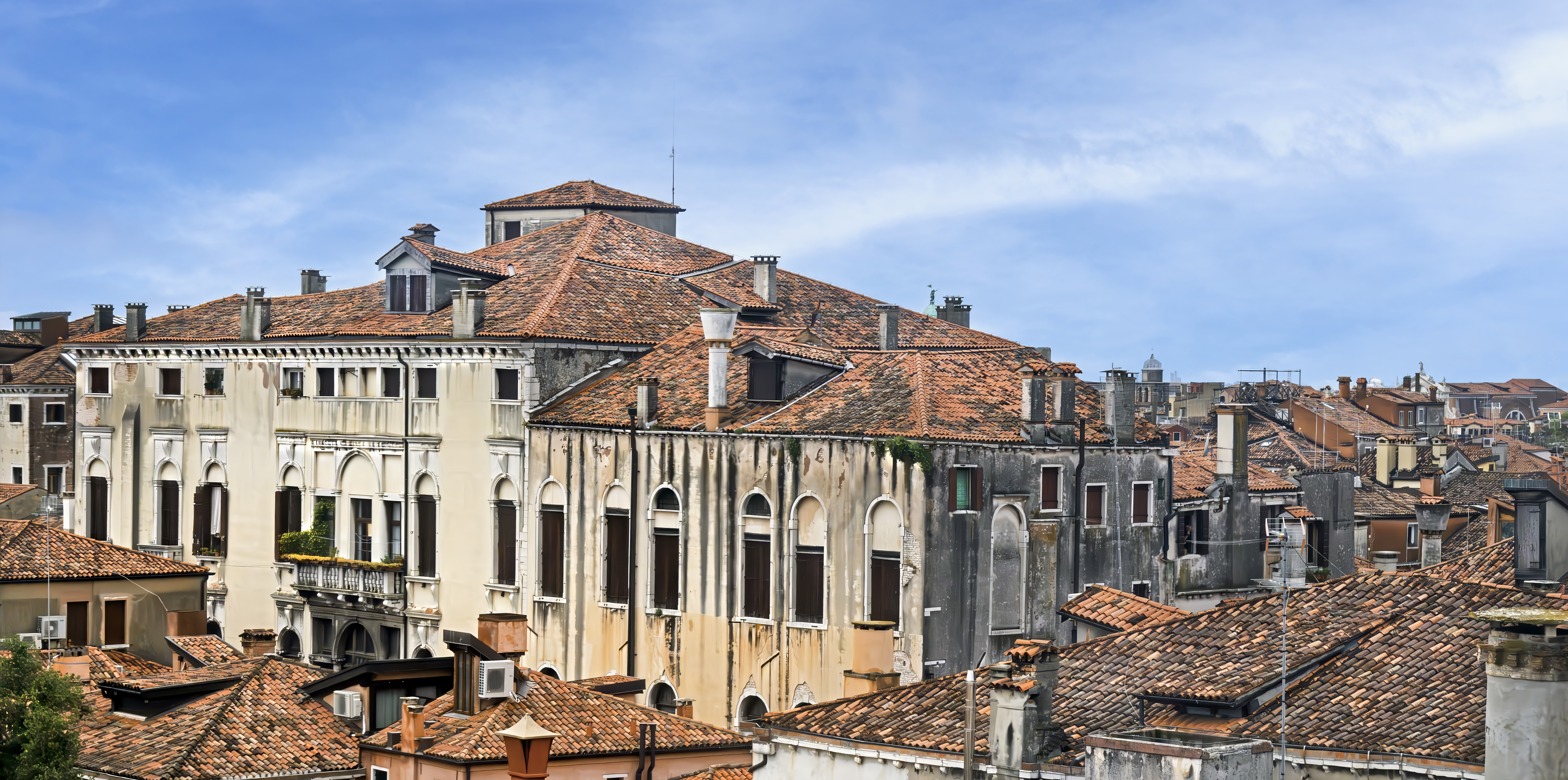
- Mocenigo Palace-Museum seen from Ca' Pesaro

- Location in Italy

General information
- Coordinates: 45°26′05″N 12°19′43″E

The Museo di Palazzo Mocenigo (aka Palazzo Mocenigo di San Stae) is a palazzo near the Church of San Stae, south of the Grand Canal in the sestiere of Santa Croce in Venice, Italy. It is now a museum of fabrics and costumes, run by the Fondazione Musei Civici di Venezia.

== Building ==
The palazzo is a large building in the gothic style. It was rebuilt extensively at the start of the 17th century. From this time, the palazzo was the residence of the San Stae branch of the Mocenigo family, one of the most important Venetian families. Seven members of the family were Doges of Venice.

== Museum ==
The Palazzo Mocenigo was bequeathed to the city of Venice by Alvise Nicolò Mocenigo in 1945. He was the last descendant of the family and intended the palazzo to be used "as a Gallery of Art, to supplement Museo Correr". In 1985, the palazzo was designated as the Museum and Study Centre of the History of Fabrics and Costumes. The museum contains collections of textiles and costumes, mainly from the Correr, Guggenheim, and Cini collections, as well as the Palazzo Grassi. Palazzo Mocenigo also has a library on the first floor covering the history of costumes, fabrics, and fashion, especially from the 18th century.

The palace was frescoed by 18th-century artists including Giambattista Canal, Giovanni Scajaro, and Jacopo Guarana.

The museum was restored and reopened in 2013.

== See also ==
- Palazzi Mocenigo on the Grand Canal
