= Giovanni Scajario =

Italian painter

Giovanni Scajario, also known as Scajaro, Scagliaro, Scaggiaro (1726–1792) was an Italian painter of the Rococo period, active mainly in Venice.

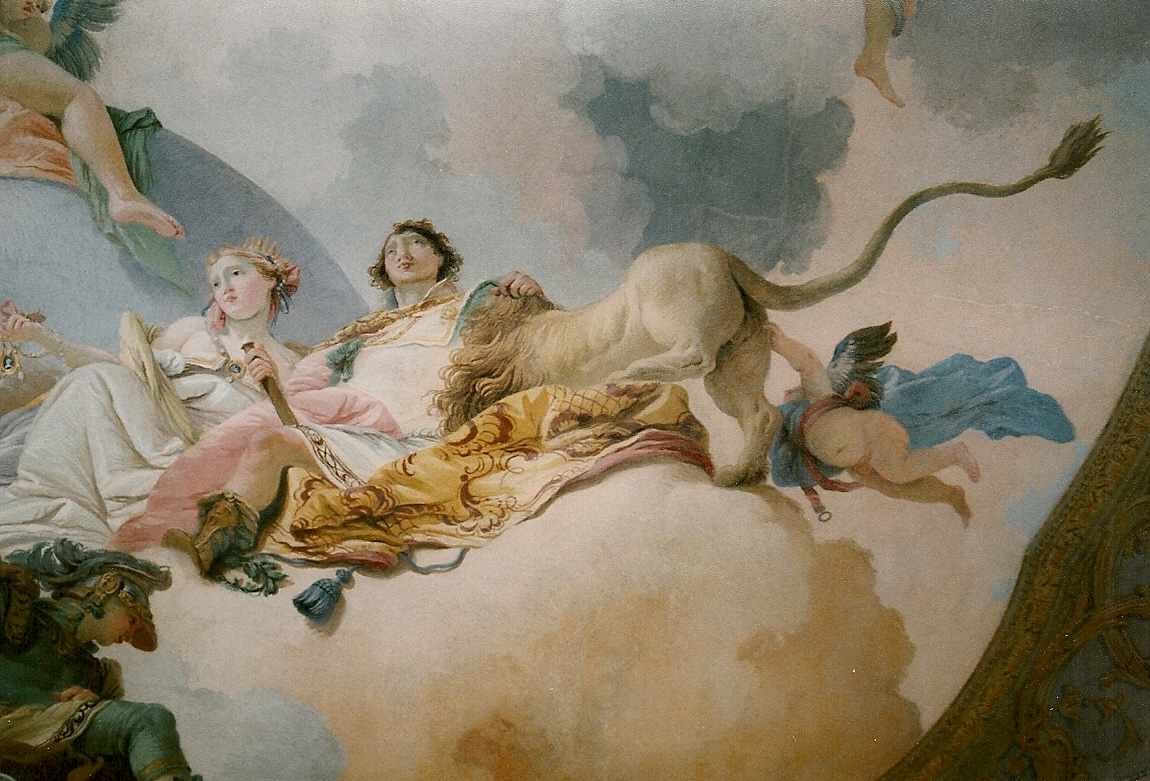
Frescoes Palazzo Pisani in Venice.

== Biography ==
He was born in Asiago, son of Antonio Sajario, a painter. Giovanni was a follower, if not a pupil, of Giovanni Battista Tiepolo. He has frescoes in various palaces and churches in Veneto, including Palazzi Roberti in Bassano del Grappa, Mocenigo di San Stae, and Marin. He also painted for the churches of San Biagio in Venice, Sant'Anna in Valsugana, and a St Anthony of Padua for the parish church of Rotzo in the Province of Vicenza.
