= Giovanni Battista Canal =

Italian painter (1745–1825)

Giovanni Battista Canal or Canale (1745 – 5 December 1825) was an Italian painter of the late Baroque and early Neoclassical era, active mainly depicting history and sacred subjects in his native Venice.

== Biography ==
His father, Fabio Canal, was a fresco painter that was a follower of Tiepolo. Giovanni Battista was criticized for his celeritude in fresco painting, which led to a nickname of fa presto. He too was strongly echoed by the light colors of Tiepolo, but lacked the skill in design of the great master.

Giovanni Battista was initially trained by his father and then at the Academy of Fine Arts, Venice, where he would also teach from 1783 to 1807. He was made an academic in 1776. He was active throughout the Veneto, and also in Ferrara and Udine.

Among his works were the ceiling of the church of Sant'Eufemia in the Giudecca. In 1776, he painted for the church of Fonte in Asolo. He painted Storia d'amore in villa Viola of Treviso; frescoes (1790) for the Palazzo Mocenigo a San Stae in Venice; frescoes (1804) for the Palazzo Filodrammatici of Treviso; and a Martyrdom of Santi Gervasio e Protasio (1822) for the church of San Trovaso in Treviso. In later years, he collaborated with the neoclassical quadratura painter Giuseppe Borsato. He also lost his sight in later years, but his impoverishment forced him to continue to paint.
