= Santa Maria delle Penitenti =

Church in Venice, Italy

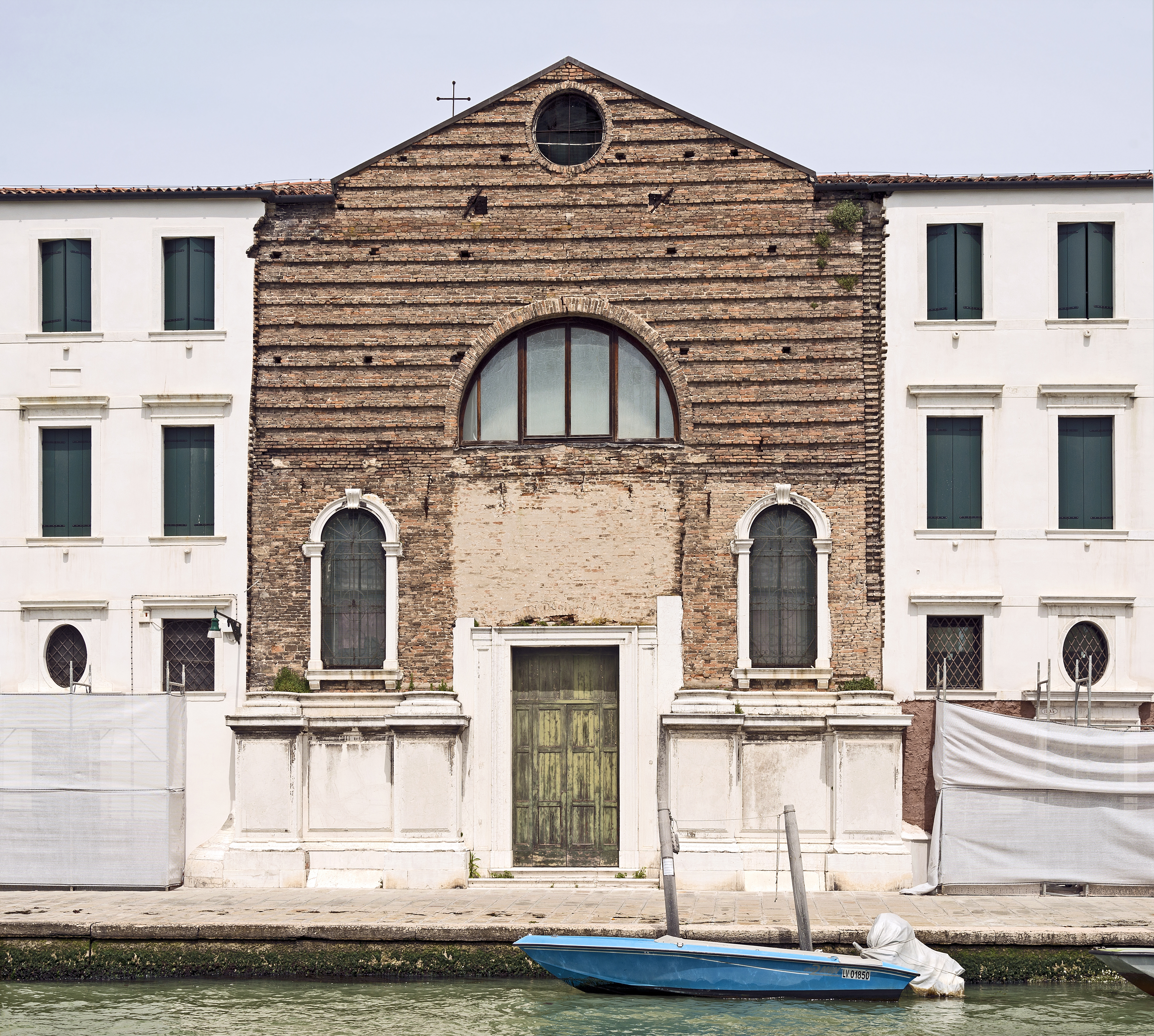
- Church facade.

- Location within Venice Location within Italy

Religion
- Affiliation: Roman Catholic
- Province: Venice

Location
- Location: Venice, Italy
- Interactive map of Santa Maria delle Penitenti
- Coordinates: 45°26′48″N 12°19′09″E

The church of Santa Maria delle Penitenti, is part of a large complex: Pio Loco delle Penitenti, located on the canal Cannaregio, near its exit to the lagoon facing Mestre, in the Northwest edge of Venice, Italy. It gained its name as a charitable institution providing an alternative life to former prostitutes, akin to a Magdalene asylum.

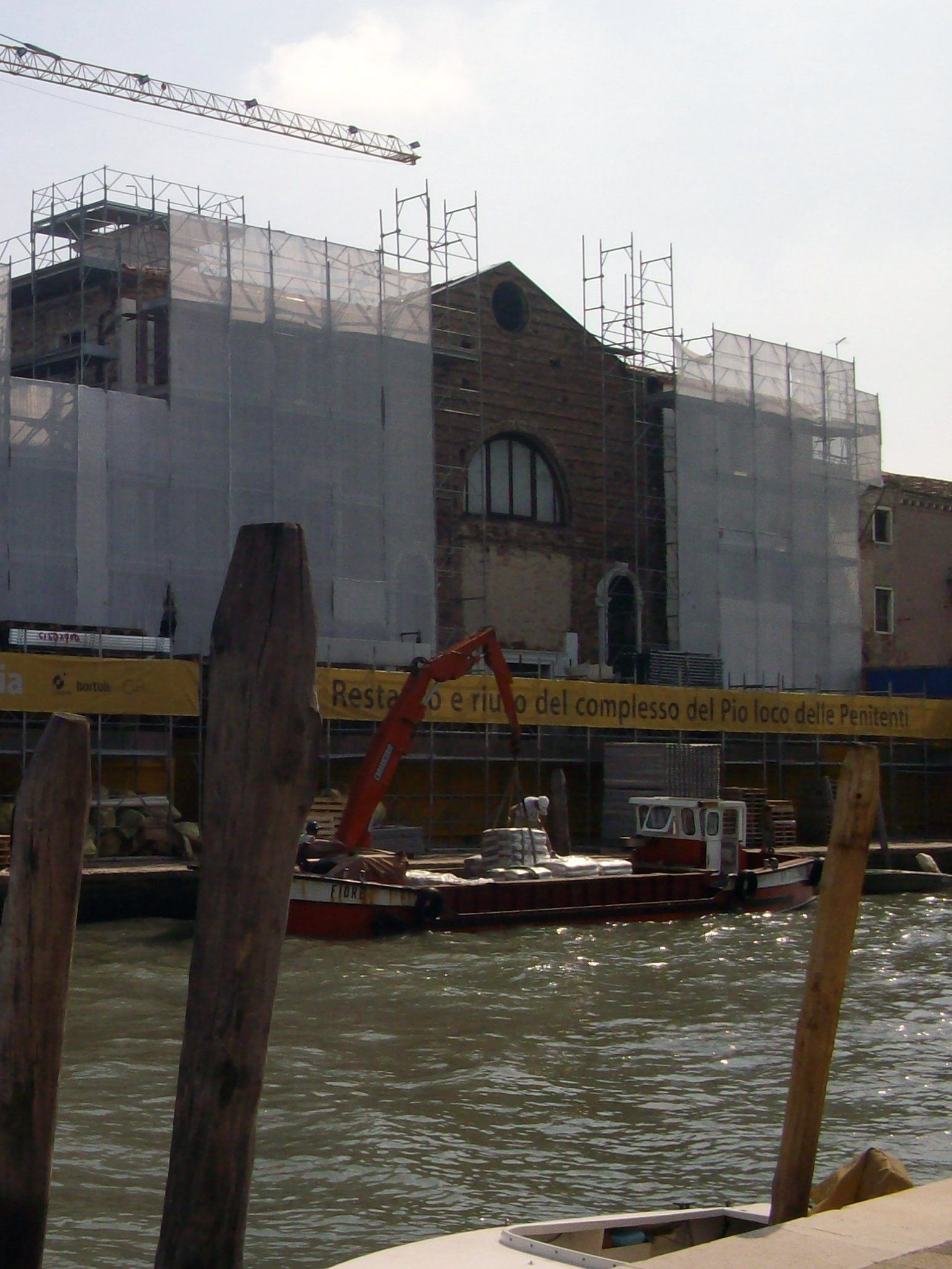
Site under restoration.

== History ==
Venice, like many large and well-traveled cities in Europe, had a substantial population of women engaged in prostitution. Because reversion to the typical family life was improbable, most of the institutions created to minister these women created a retreat from the outside world. The Pio Loco delle Penitenti in 1745 stated that its goal was to:

support poor penitent women, instituted under the invocation of the Blessed Virgin, and with the patronage of the Patriarch San Lorenzo Giustinian, for their redemption from the clutches of the devil.

In 1357, an institution was established in the somewhat isolated island of Santi Cristoforo e Onorio; but the outfit closed a few years later.

By the 16th-century, the monastery of Santa Maria Maddalena had been erected in the island of Giudecca, but this convent was under the strict Order of St Augustine, and many women were not amenable to that cloistered lifestyle, which included vows of silence.

In 1703, the Venetian patriarch, later cardinal, Giovanni Alberto Badoer gained approval of the Council of Ten to create this charitable institution. In this regard, he was helped by the funding of aristocrat Elisabetta Rossi and the drive of priest Rinaldo Bellini, member of the Oratorian Order of St Phillip Neri. The creation of more secular institutions of the faithful was also more aligned with the Oratorian aims.

For a few years, the charity was housed in Castello, but by 1705 had moved to this site, on the bank across from the church of San Giobbe. A donation in 1725 by the noblewoman Marina Priuli da Lezze, allowed construction to expand. Among further donors over the next century are the Patriarch Piero Barbarigo, noblewoman Marina Nani Donado, Gaetano De Menego, and Gaspare Caffre.

The rules of the institution required the entrants to be between 12 and 30 years, living in Venice at least a year, healthy in mind and body, not pregnant, and have withdrawn from prostitution for at least three months. With Napoleonic rule, this institution was suppressed and the inhabitants moved to the Ospissio del Socorso in Dorsoduro. The building served after the war to house women fleeing from areas formerly under Italian occupation in Africa and Yugoslavia.

The complex consists of a church, located on the canal, and two lengthy wings housing the women with two interior courtyards. The original design was completed by Giorgio Massari by 1725. The wings were completed in three stories from 1730 to 1738, but the church facade was never completed and superior portions remain in brick. The buildings are presently under restoration, with plans to create a hospice for the elderly.
