= Le Eremite =

17th-century Italian Catholic church

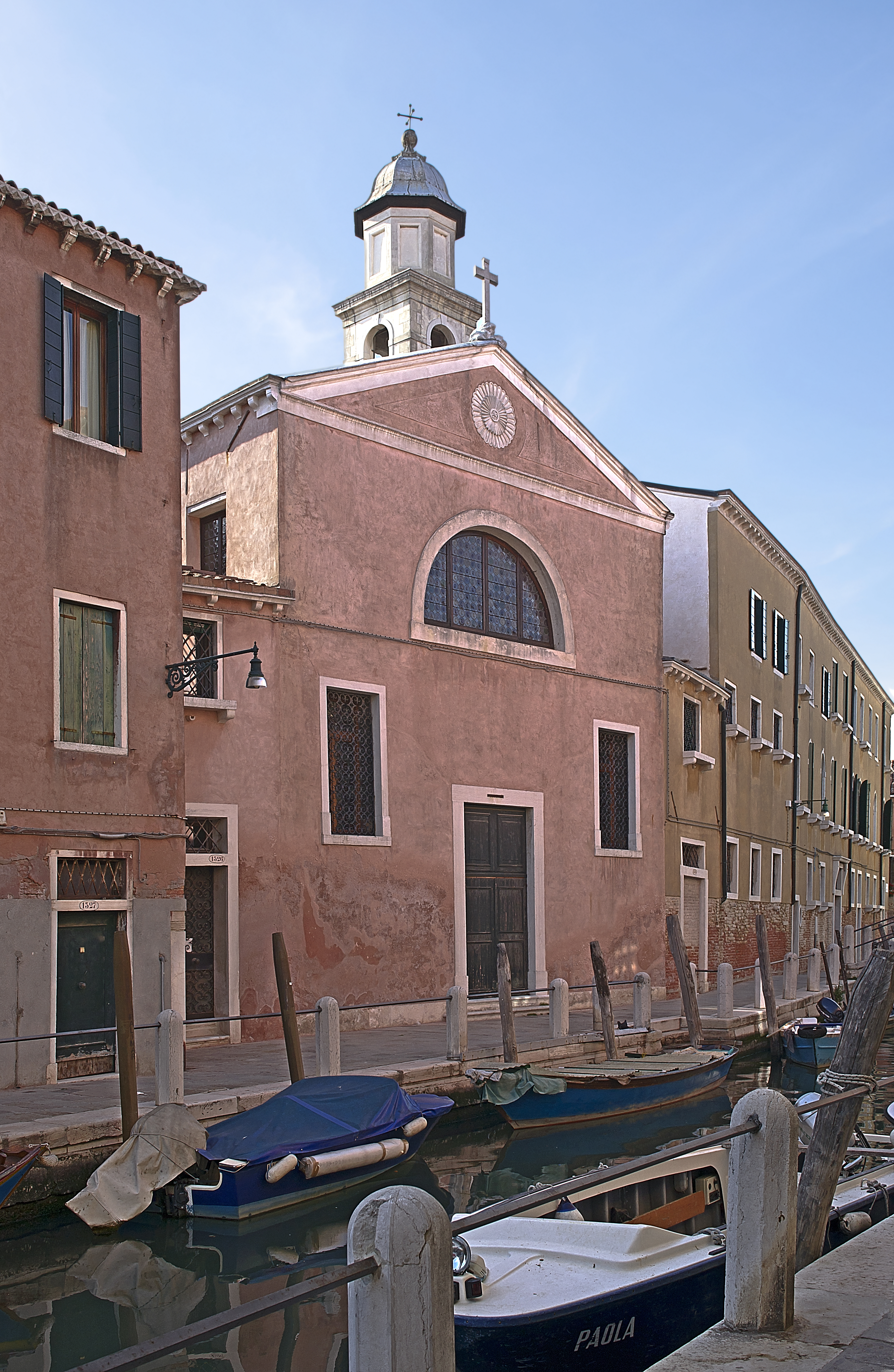
- Le Eremite Church - Venice

- Location within Venice Location within Italy

Religion
- Affiliation: Catholic
- Province: Venice

Location
- Location: Venice, Italy
- Interactive map of Le Eremite
- Coordinates: 45.4319°N 12.3245°E

Architecture
- Completed: 17th century

Le Eremite is a small Catholic church in the Dorsoduro area of Venice, Italy. It was built at the end of the 17th century for Augustinian nuns. It formed part of a larger complex which included a convent and schools run by the nuns. The schools ran until the middle of the last century and taught children of all ages - from infants to high school. The church is dedicated to Jesus, Mary and Joseph. Construction was completed in 1694.

== Description ==
The church has a single nave. Artworks include a 15th-century gilded woodwork of the Madonna della Misericordia and a statue of the Virgin and Child by Antonio Corradini.

== Restoration ==
The church was restored in the late 1990s by Venice in Peril. Venice in Peril did work on the altars to stabilise them. Four wall paintings by Francesco Pittoni showing the miracles of St Augustine were restored in 2002.
