= San Stae =

Church in central Venice, Italy

Coordinates: 45°26′29″N 12°19′50″E

Church of San Stae
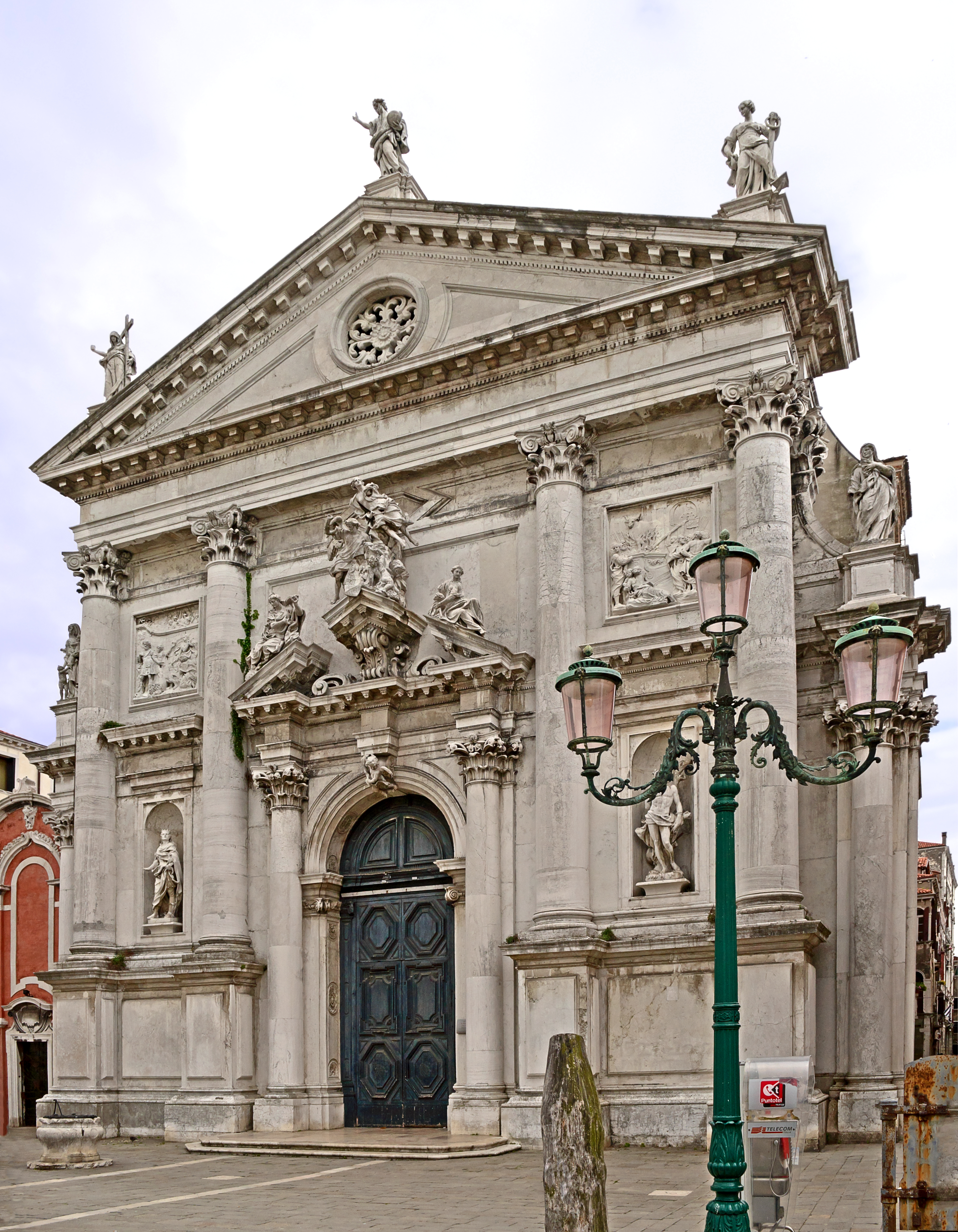

- Location within Venice Location within Italy

Religion
- Affiliation: Roman Catholic
- Province: Venice

Location
- Location: Venice, Italy

Architecture
- Architect: Domenico Rossi
- Type: Church
- Style: Baroque
- Completed: 17th century

San Stae is a church in central Venice, in the sestiere of Santa Croce.

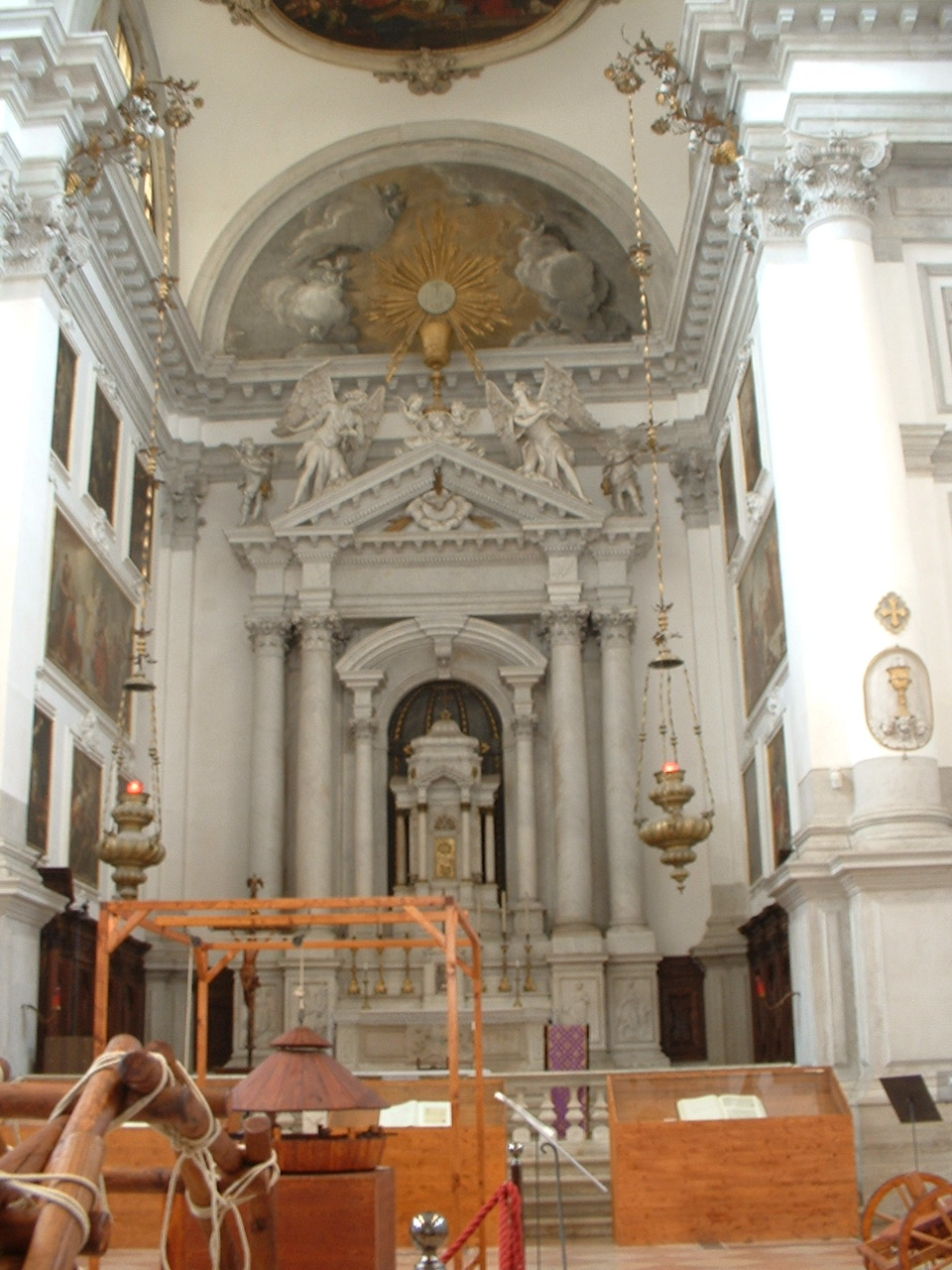
Interior of San Stae

San Stae, an abbreviation for Saint Eustachius, was founded at the beginning of the 11th century and reconstructed in the 17th century, and has a main facade (1709) on the Grand Canal of Venice, constructed by Domenico Rossi, and richly decorated with statuary by Giuseppe Torretto, Antonio Tarsia, Pietro Baratta, and Antonio Corradini.

The interior has a tomb for the Mocenigo family. The right wall contains altars with works by Niccolò Bambini, Giuseppe Camerata, and Antonio Balestra. The three chapels on the left house works by Giuseppe Torretto, Pietro Baratta, Francesco Migliori, and Jacopo Amigoni. The roof of the presbytery has a ceiling decorated with a large canvas by Bartolomeo Letterini, while the walls have canvases by Giuseppe Angeli and small canvases dedicated to the Apostles, including a Martyrdom of St. Bartholemew (1721) (right lower) by a young Giambattista Tiepolo; The Martyrdom of Saint Thomas by Giambattista Pittoni, a Martyrdom of St. James the Greater by Giambattista Piazzetta; and a Liberation of St. Peter by Sebastiano Ricci (left lower). The sacristy contains a Death of Christ by Pietro della Vecchia and a Trajan orders Sant'Eustachio to pray to the idols by Giambattista Pittoni.

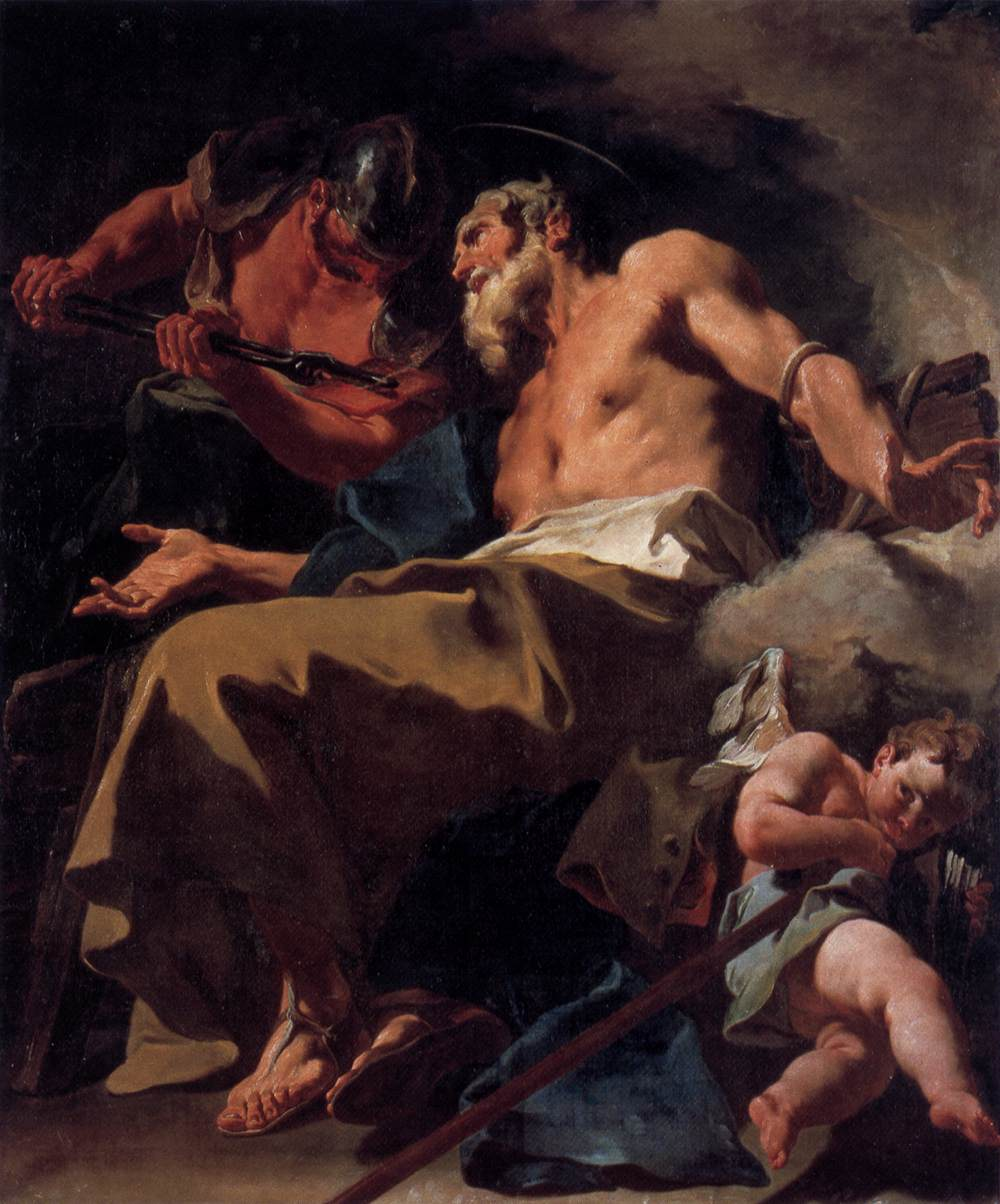
Giambattista Pittoni, Torture of St Thomas

== See also ==
- Museo di Palazzo Mocenigo

== Sources ==
- Chorus Venezia entry
