= Giuseppe Torretto =

Italian sculptor

Giuseppe Torretto or Torretti (1661 in Pagnano – 1743 in Venice) was an Italian sculptor of statues and intaglios.

Mainly working in Venice, statues by him can be found in the churches of Santa Maria Formosa, I Gesuiti, Santa Maria di Nazareth and San Stae among others. The side walls of the Manin Chapel at Udine have stone high-reliefs by him showing scenes from the life of the Blessed Virgin Mary. He also founded a notable studio, which was kept going after his death by his grandchildren Giuseppe Bernardi and Giovanni Ferrari, whose students included Antonio Canova.

Saint Sebastian on the front of San Stae church in Venice

Saint Oswald on the front of San Stae church in Venice

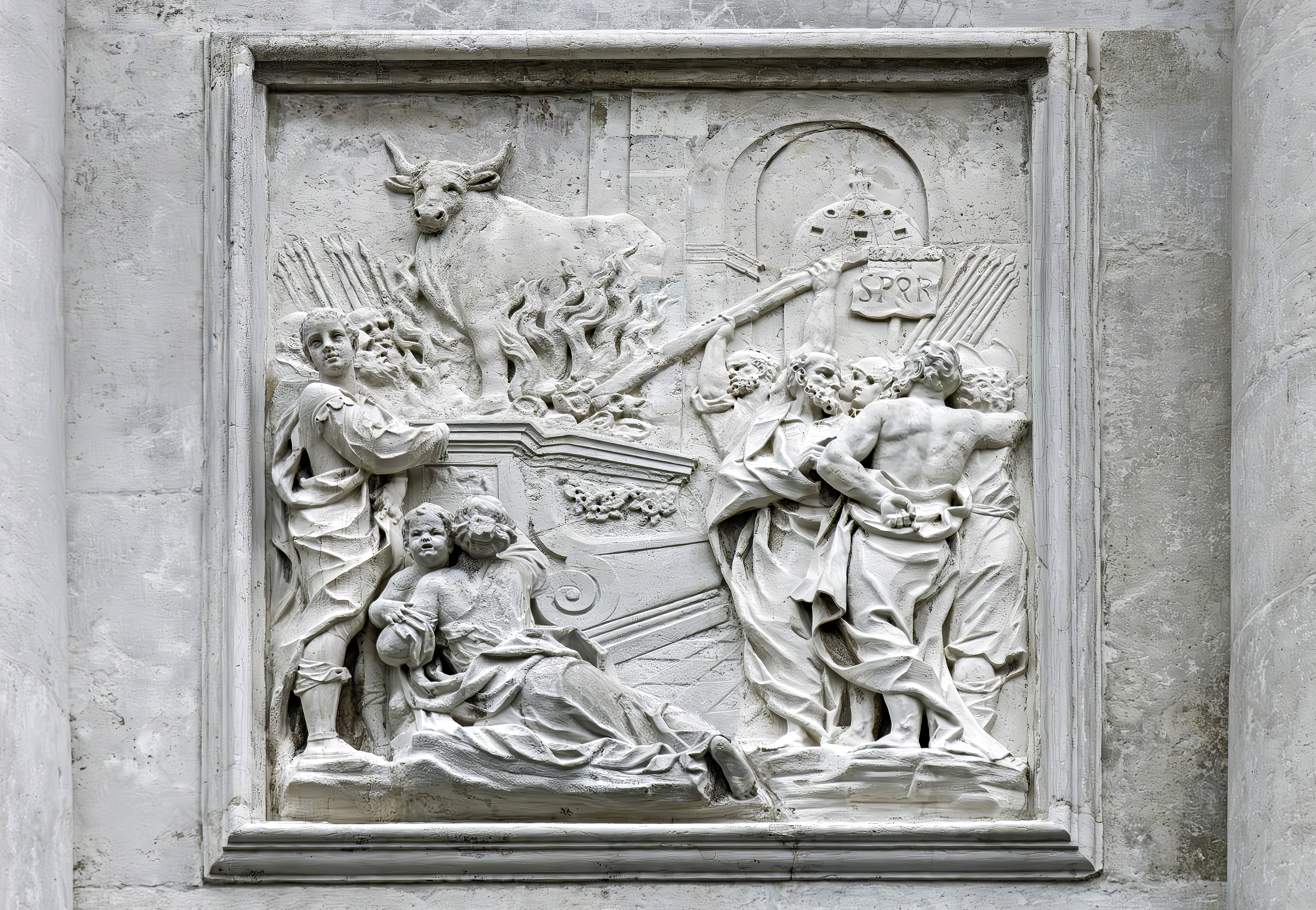
Martyrdom of Saint Eustace and his family San Stae church in Venice

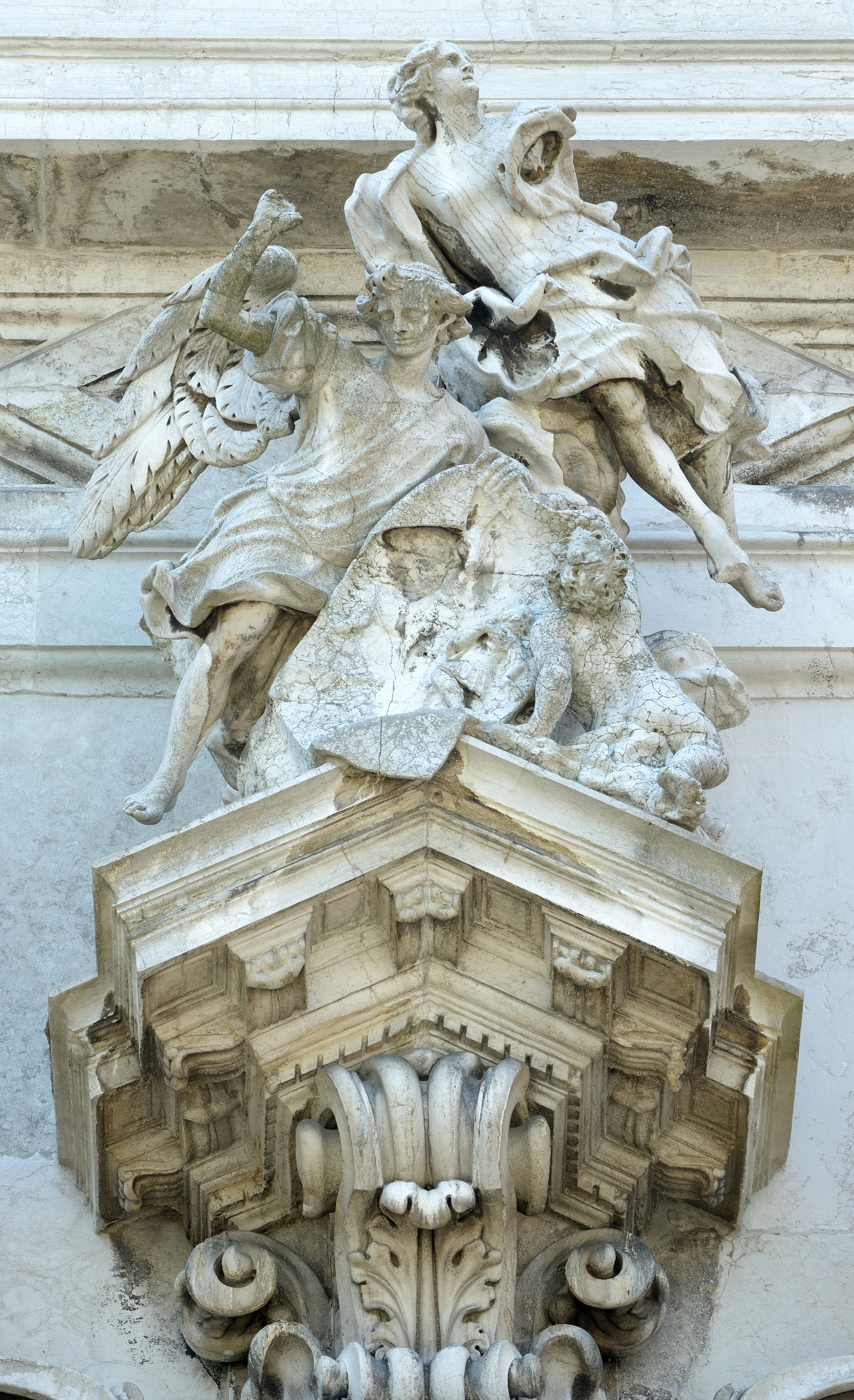
Angels by Giuseppe Torretti on the facade of San Stae church in Venice

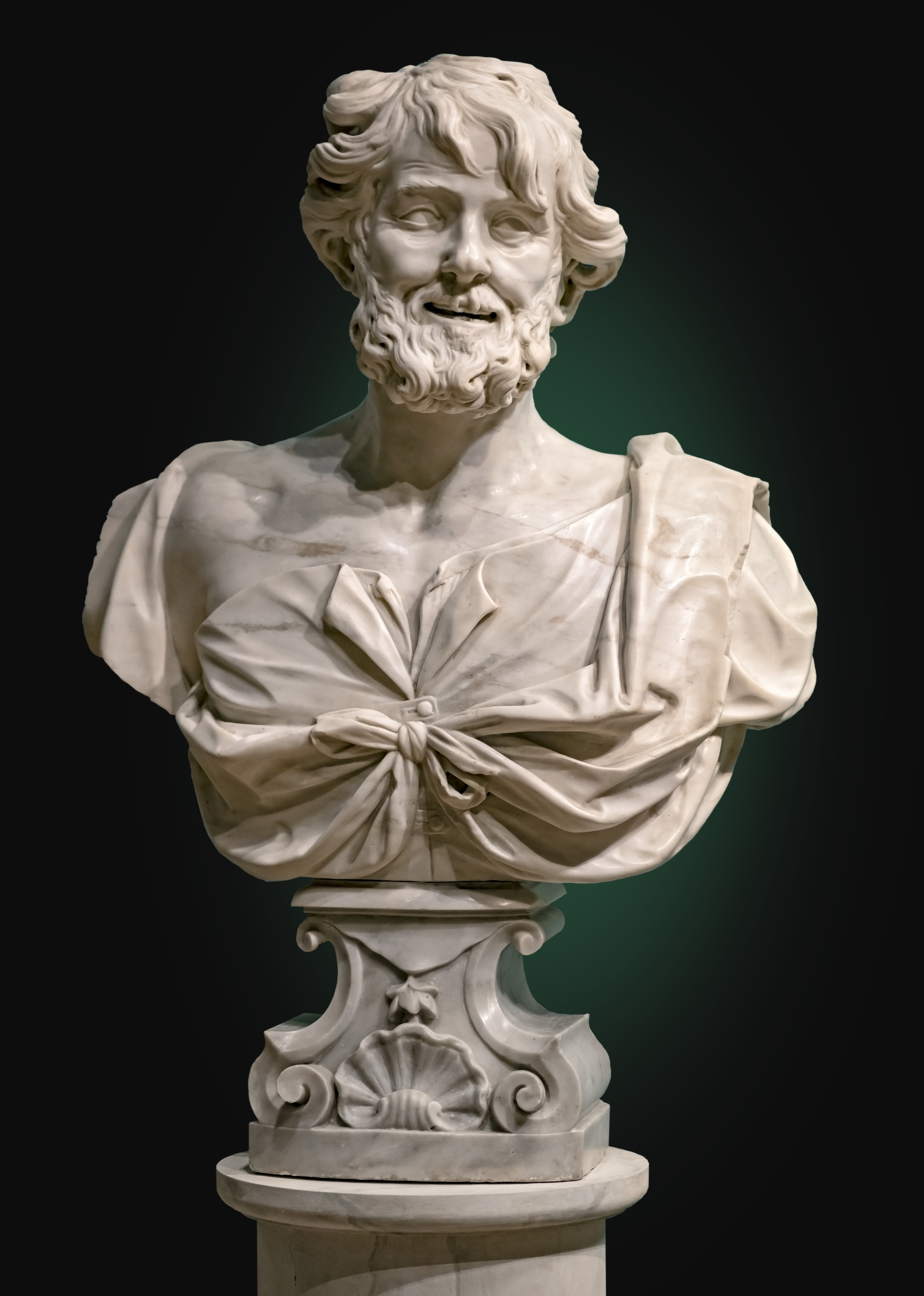
Democritus in Ca' Rezzonico

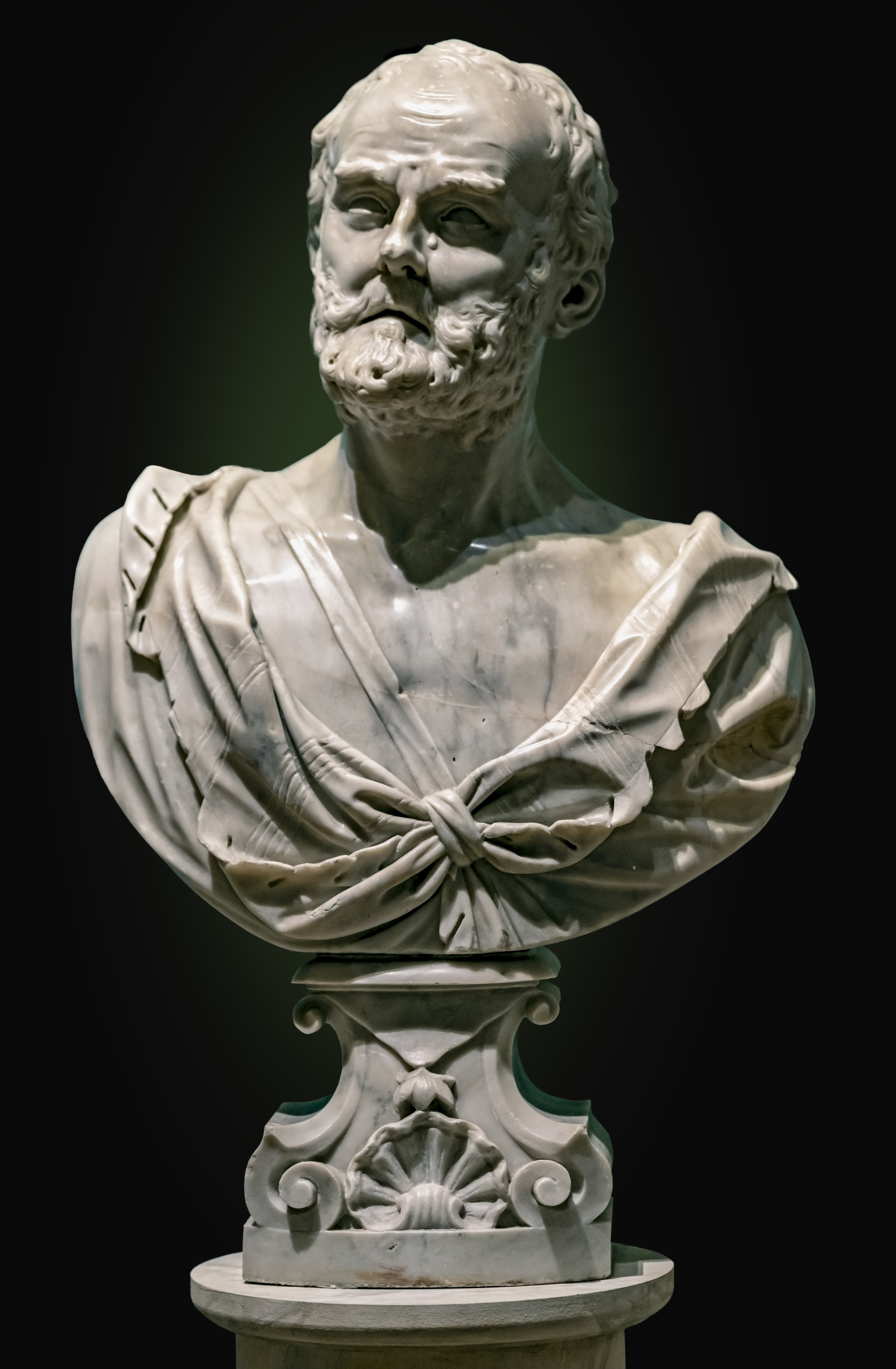
Heraclitus in Ca' Rezzonico

Boy Carrying a Nest - Palazzo Zuckermann Padua
