= Sant'Andrea della Zirada =

Church building in Venice, Italy

Church of Sant'Andrea della Zirada
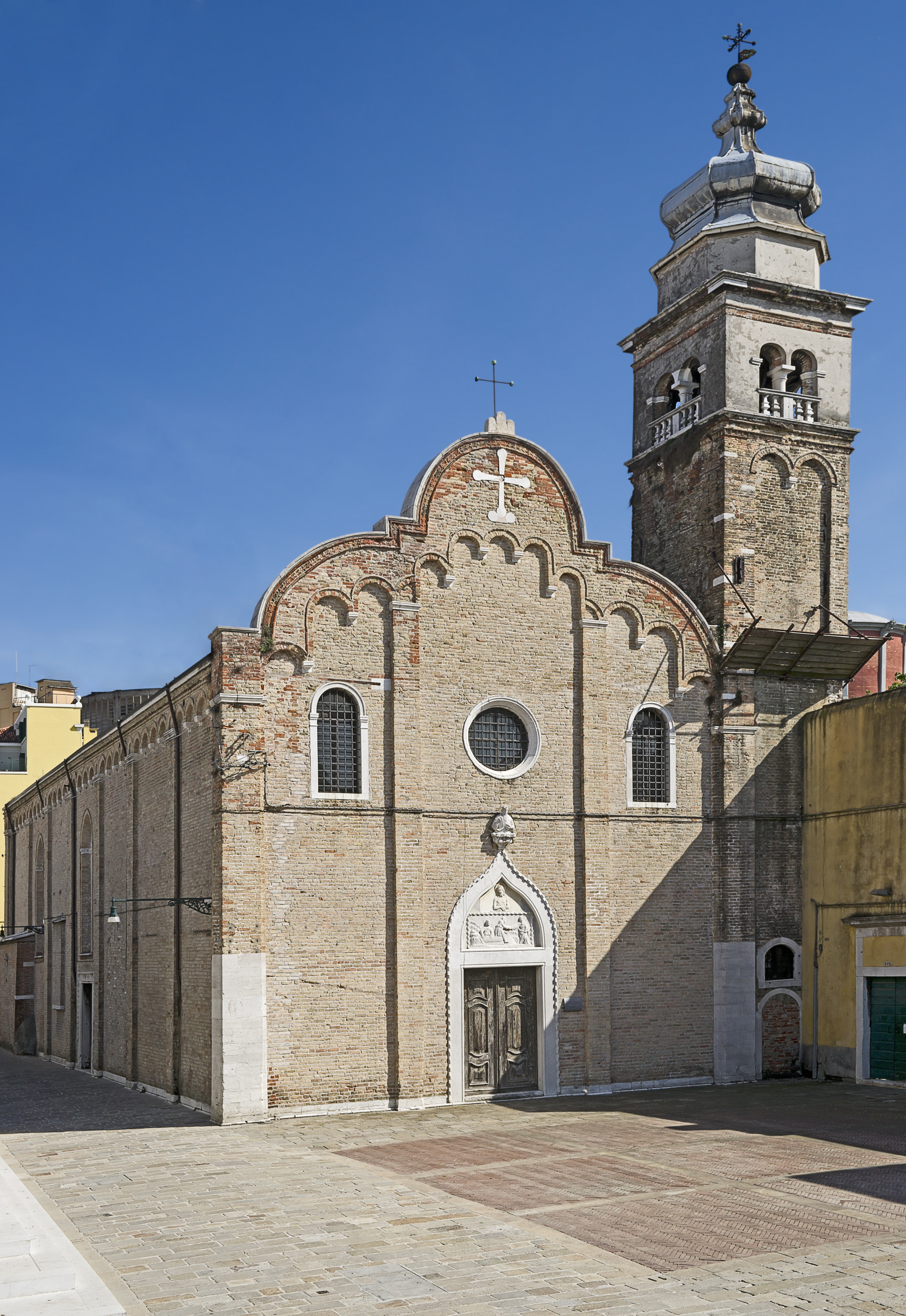
- Church of Sant'Andrea della Zirada

- Location within Venice

Religion
- Affiliation: Roman Catholic

Location
- Municipality: Venice
- Country: Italy
- Coordinates: 45°26′18″N 12°18′58″E

Architecture
- Type: Church
- Style: Gothic
- Completed: 1329

Sant'Andrea della Zirada is a church and a monastery in Venice, northern Italy.

The church and the monastery, both dedicated to Saint Andrew, were founded in 1329 by four noblewomen on a place called "cao de zirada". The church was largely rebuilt in 1475, the most important part remaining of the original Gothic edifice being the façade. Noteworthy is the main portal in Istrian white stone with two 14th-century bas-reliefs of Christ as Man of Sorrows and The Calling of the Apostles Saints Peter and Andrew from the fishing boat.

The interior has a single nave with a plain ceiling, with a Gothic choir with stucco part from the 17th century. The main artworks are the Dead Christ between St. Charles Borromeo and Angels by Domenico Tintoretto, the St. Augustine with Two Angels by Paris Bordon and a St. Jerome by Paolo Veronese, the last now in the Accademia.
