= Giuseppe Bernardi =

Italian sculptor (1694-1773)

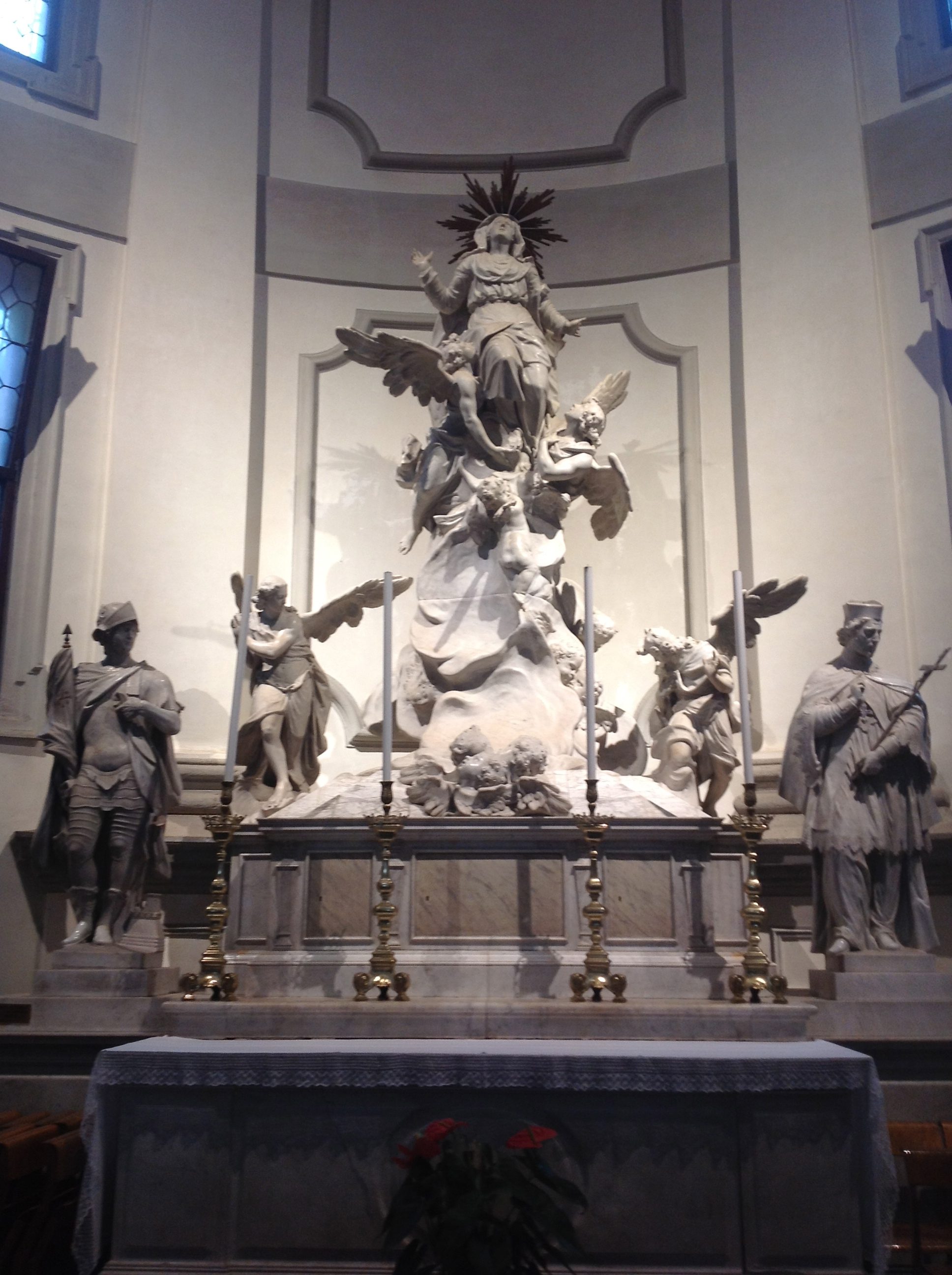
Assunta Cathedral of Castelfranco

Giuseppe Bernardi (24 March 1694 in Pagnano – 22 February 1773 in Venice), also called Torretto, was a prominent mid-18th-century Italian sculptor. He is also known as a carver of intaglios and as the first teacher of Neoclassical sculptor Antonio Canova. His father was Sebastiano Bernardi whose works include the statues of the park of the Villa Manin di Passariano (Udine) and of the Prato della Valle in Padua. His mother, Cecilia Torretto, was sister to the sculptor Giuseppe Torretto and Bernardi took the nickname "il Torretto" as a child in honor of his uncle.

== Career ==
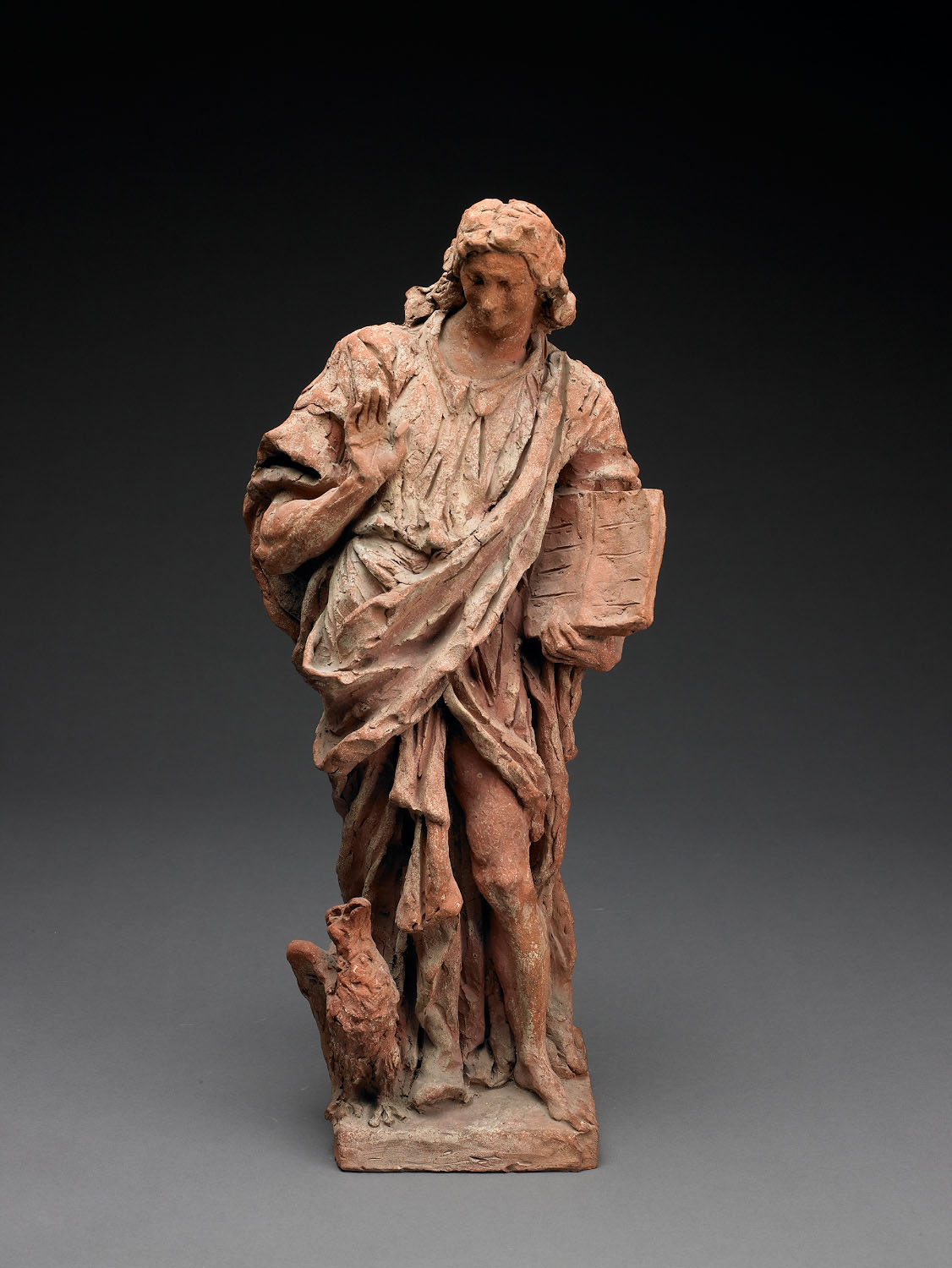
Terracota model of John the Evangelist, 18th century, Birmingham Museum of Art

Bernardi learned his craft from his maternal uncle whose workshop he later inherited. He worked on both small and large projects, and documents from his workshop indicate that he was quite prolific, taking on numerous projects at a time. Beginning in the 1730s, he was involved with the Santa Maria della Fava sculptural project which took him several decades to complete. He was commissioned to sculpt eight, over-lifesized marble statues of the four Evangelists and the four Western Fathers of the Church.

Among Bernardi's students was Antonio Canova. Recognising Canova's talent, Bernardi consented to Canova moving to another studio, in Venice. The latter was inherited by his grandchild Giovanni Ferrari.
