= Domenico Rossi (architect) =

Swiss-Italian architect

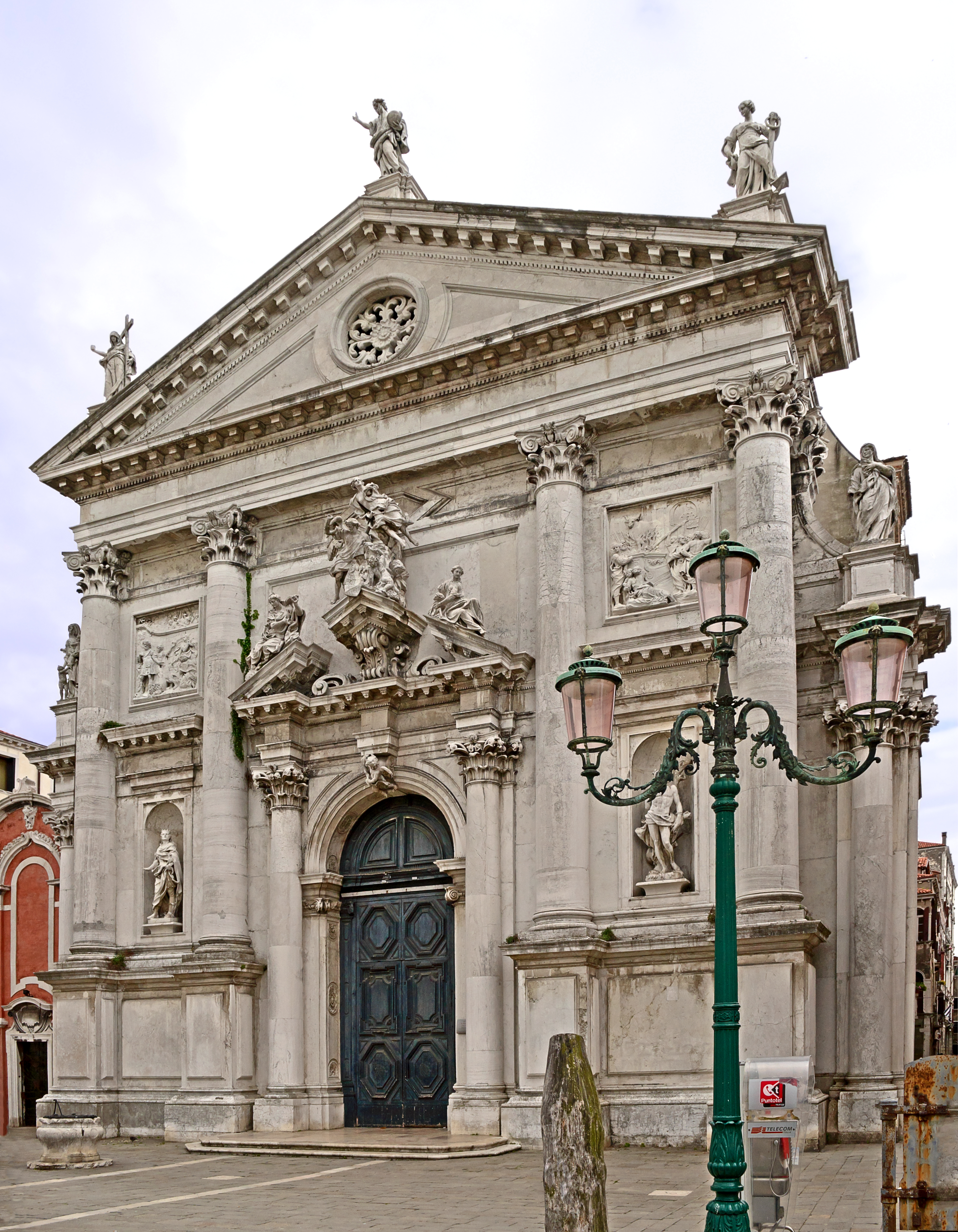
The facade of the Church of San Stae designed by Domenico Rossi

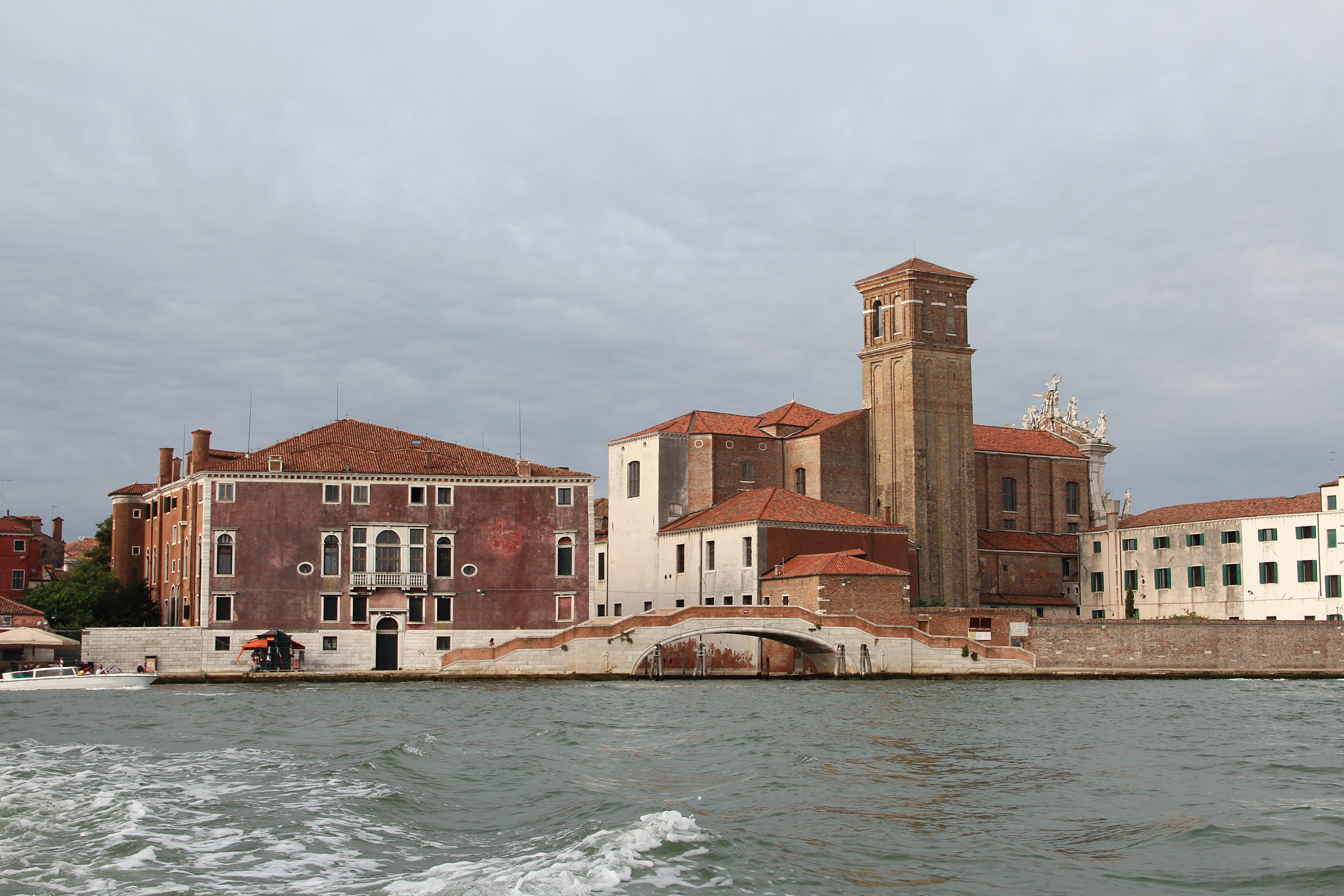
The northeast side of Santa Maria Assunta known as "I Gesuiti" and its campanile (Domenico Rossi - 1715–1728)

Domenico Rossi (28 December 1657 – 8 March 1737) was a Swiss-Italian architect.

== Biography ==
He was born in Morcote, Ticino, and was a pupil of Baldassarre Longhena. Later he became the family architect of the noble Venetian houses of Dolfin, Savorgnan and Manin. In 1701 he directed the restoration of Palazzo Dolfin and in 1709 he was commissioned the renovation of the façade of San Stae church.

In 1713 he designed the Baroque church of the Gesuiti, also in Venice, while in 1714-1715 he worked at the church of Ljubljana's Križanke, in the shape of a Greek cross. In 1724 he built the Ca' Corner della Regina. One of his last works was the renovation of the Cathedral of Udine.

Rossi died in 1737 in Venice.
