= San Biagio, Venice =

Church in Venice, Italy

Church of San Biagio
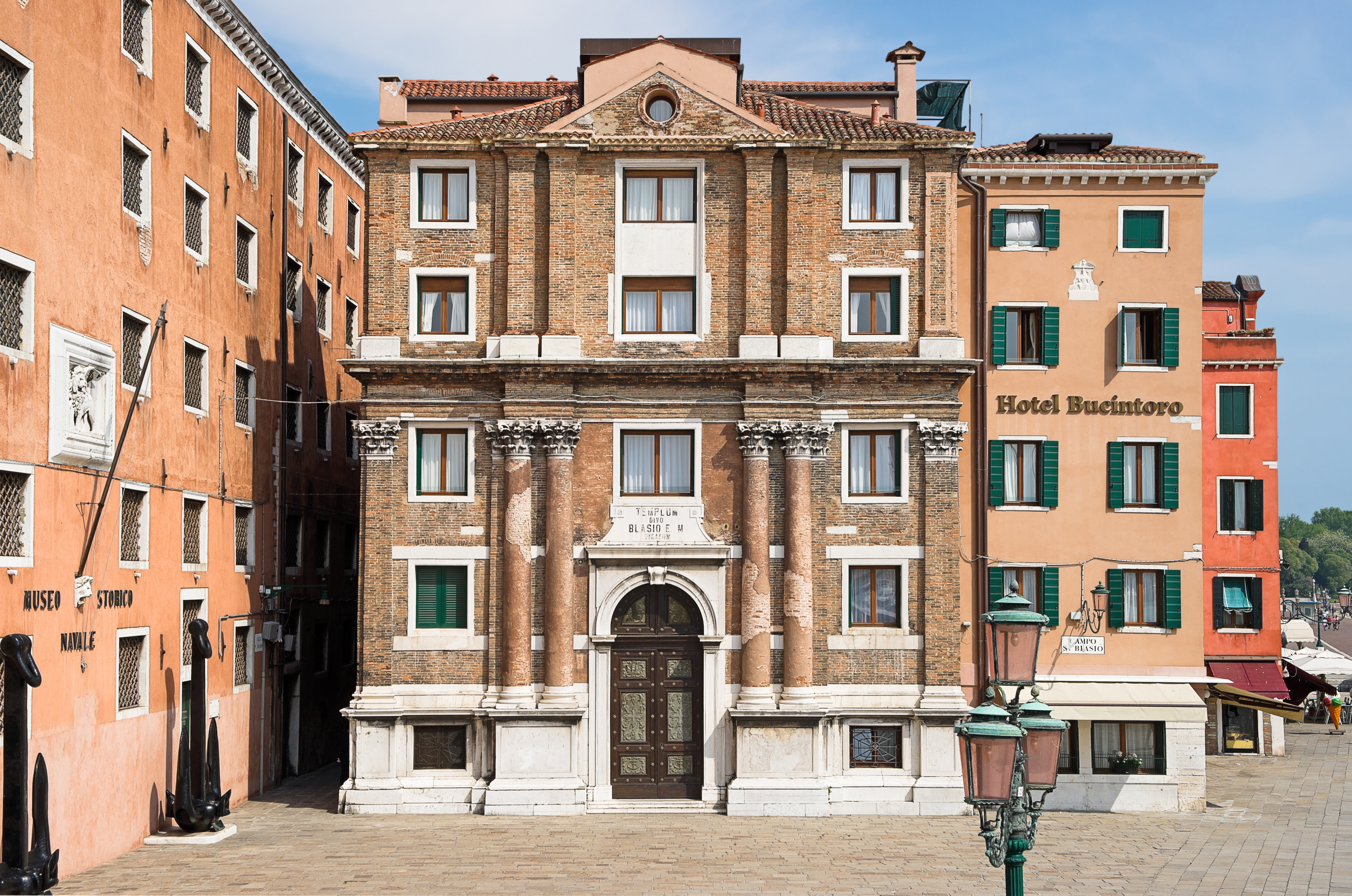

- Location within Venice Location within Italy

Religion
- Affiliation: Roman Catholic
- Province: Venice

Location
- Location: Venice, Italy
- Coordinates: 45.4325°N 12.3501°E

Architecture
- Architect: Filippo Rossi
- Type: Church
- Style: Baroque
- Completed: 1752

San Biagio is a church dedicated to Saint Blaise, in the sestiere of Castello in Venice, northern Italy.

== Description and history ==
The church now stands adjacent to the Museo Storico Navale, and is officiated by a military chaplain. Till 1511, this served as the church for the Greek community which had emigrated to Venice after the Fall of Constantinople. It was rebuilt in 1745-1752, likely to plans of Filippo Rossi. The vault was frescoed by Giovanni Scajaro with Saint Blaise in Glory. The altars were transferred here from the church of Sant'Anna. On the left hand wall is a funerary monument with the heart of Archduke Friedrich of Austria (1821–1847). The tomb of Admiral Angelo Emo (died 1792) has a statue (1818) by Giovanni Ferrari.
