= Santa Maria della Fava =

Church building in Venice, Italy

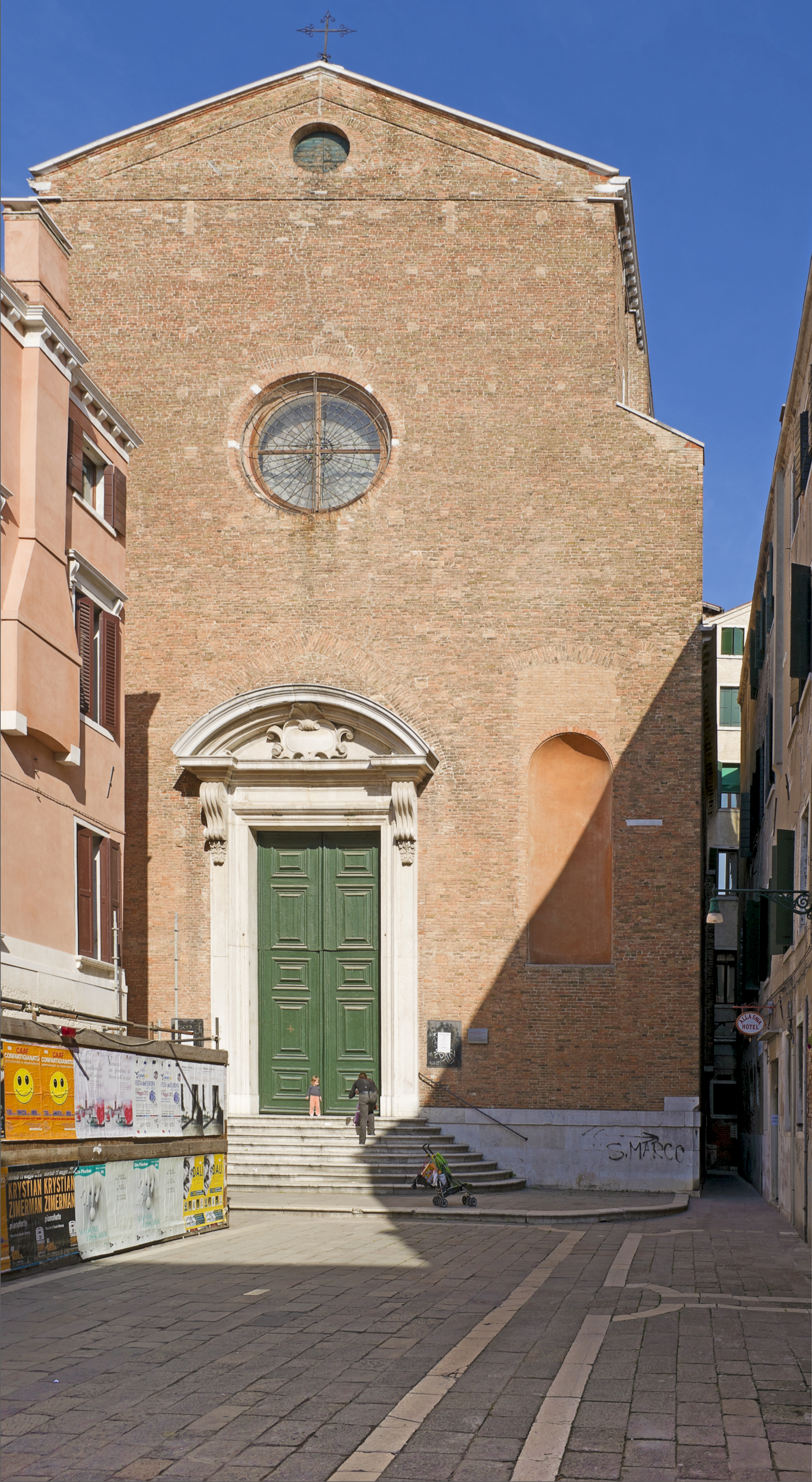

- Location within Venice Location within Italy

Religion
- Affiliation: Roman Catholic
- Province: Venice

Location
- Location: Venice, Italy
- Interactive map of Santa Maria della Fava
- Coordinates: 45°26′13″N 12°20′18″E

Santa Maria della Fava, also originally known as Santa Maria della Consolazione, is an ancient Roman Catholic church in the sestiere of Castello in Venice, Italy.

The suffix of della Fava (of the bean) attributed to the church, bridge and piazza has a number of attributed derivations. One explanation is that this area in Venice was used for the commerce of beans or the home of pastry shops for bean cake. A more colorful legend, perhaps for consumption of tourists, is that a man smuggling salt and beans was apprehended at the site, but when he kneeled before a local icon of the Madonna painted on a wall of Ca' Dolce, the salt from his bag disappeared, and thus he escaped imprisonment. The church then was built to house the miraculous icon. Finally, the church may have been endowed by the Fava family from Ferrara.

The original church at the site was completed by 1500. While by 1662, it was under the jurisdiction of the Procuratoria of St Mark, it later was under the order of Saint Phillip Neri. The reconstructed, but unfinished, church we see today was designed by Antonio Gaspari in 1711, while the apse and presbytery (1750) were completed by Giorgio Massari. The interior of the church has a famous altarpiece of Saint Anne, Young Mary, and Saint Gioacchino, (1732) by Tiepolo. It also houses a Virgin with St Phillip Neri by Piazzetta. A series of statues of Saints and Evangelists were carved by Giuseppe Bernardi. Flanking the altar, which was designed by Massari are two angels by Giovanni Maria Morlaiter.

== Sources ==
- G.Lorenzetti, Venezia e il suo estuario, Edizioni Lint, Trieste, 1974
- Marcello Brusegan, Le chiese di Venezia, Ed. Newton-Compton, 2008
- Notizie storiche delle chiese e monasteri di Venezia, e di Torcello, tratte dalle chiese veneziane, Torecellane..., Stamperia del Seminario, Appresso Giovanni Manfrè, Padua. By Flaminio Cornaro (1758) page 89–92.
