= Sant'Eufemia, Venice =

Sant'Eufemia
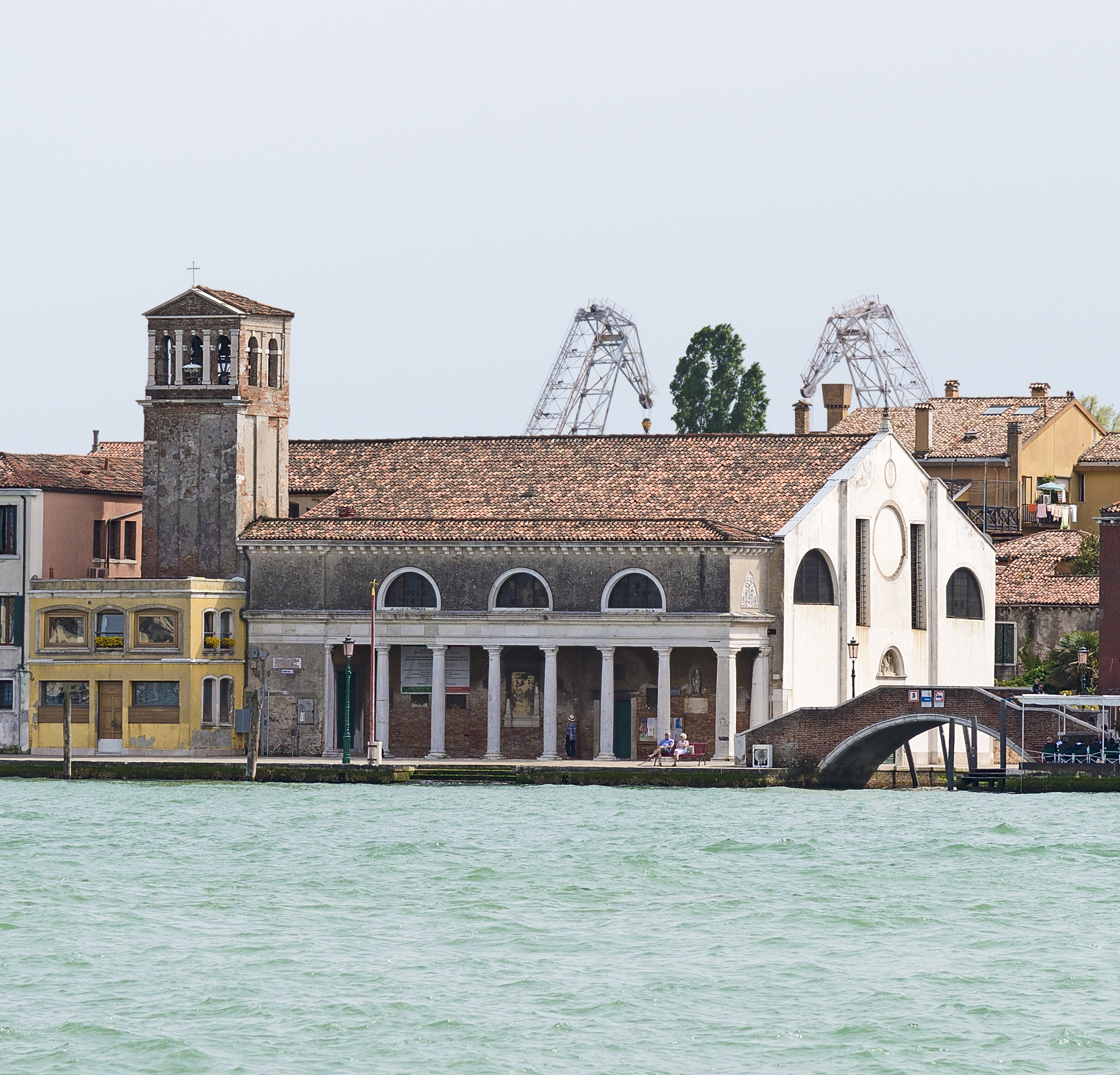
- Sant'Eufemia

- Location within Venice Location within Italy

Religion
- Affiliation: Roman Catholic
- Province: Venice

Location
- Location: Venice, Italy
- Interactive map of Sant'Eufemia
- Coordinates: 45.4269°N 12.3236°E

Sant'Eufemia (Italian: Chiesa di Sant'Eufemia) is a Roman Catholic church located in the island of Giudecca in Venice, Veneto, Italy and dedicated to saint Euphemia.

It was initially built in the 9th century in the Venetian-Byzantine style. It was restored and rebuilt several times, finally in the 18th century, when the façade was altered, stucco applied to the central nave and the ceiling vaults of the interior and three altarpieces added - 'Jesus among the Doctors' in the Chapel of St Francis, a 1771 'Visitation of the Virgin' by Giambattista Canal and 'The Adoration of the Magi' by Jacopo Marieschi (the third of these has now been moved elsewhere). The ceiling painting is also by Canal in the style of Tiepolo and shows scenes relating to the church's patron saint - her baptism in the left aisle, the saint in glory in the central nave and episodes from her life in the right aisle.

Its right side overlooks the Giudecca canal and has a portico with Doric style columns, taken from the nearby church and monastery of Santi Biagio e Cataldo during the latter's 1593 restoration. In a niche inside the porch is a Gothic-style image of the 'Holy Bishop' below a 14th-century crucifixion with donors in the Byzantine style, set in a three-faceted bezel. Its interior is a three-nave basilica, whose original columns and capitals survive. A chapel now houses the remains of Blessed Giuliana of Collalto, translated there in 1822, again from santi Biagio e Cataldo. The left aisle also houses an 18th-century marble sculpture of the Virgin Mary and Christ by Gianmaria Morlaiter in the left, whilst the firsts altarpiece in the right aisle houses the central part of a triptych of saint Roch and the angel under a lunette of the Virgin and Child, both by Bartolomeo Vivarini and dating to 1480. The presbytery also houses a painting of the Last Supper by Benfatto Alvise Dal Friso, from the Veronese school.

== Gallery ==
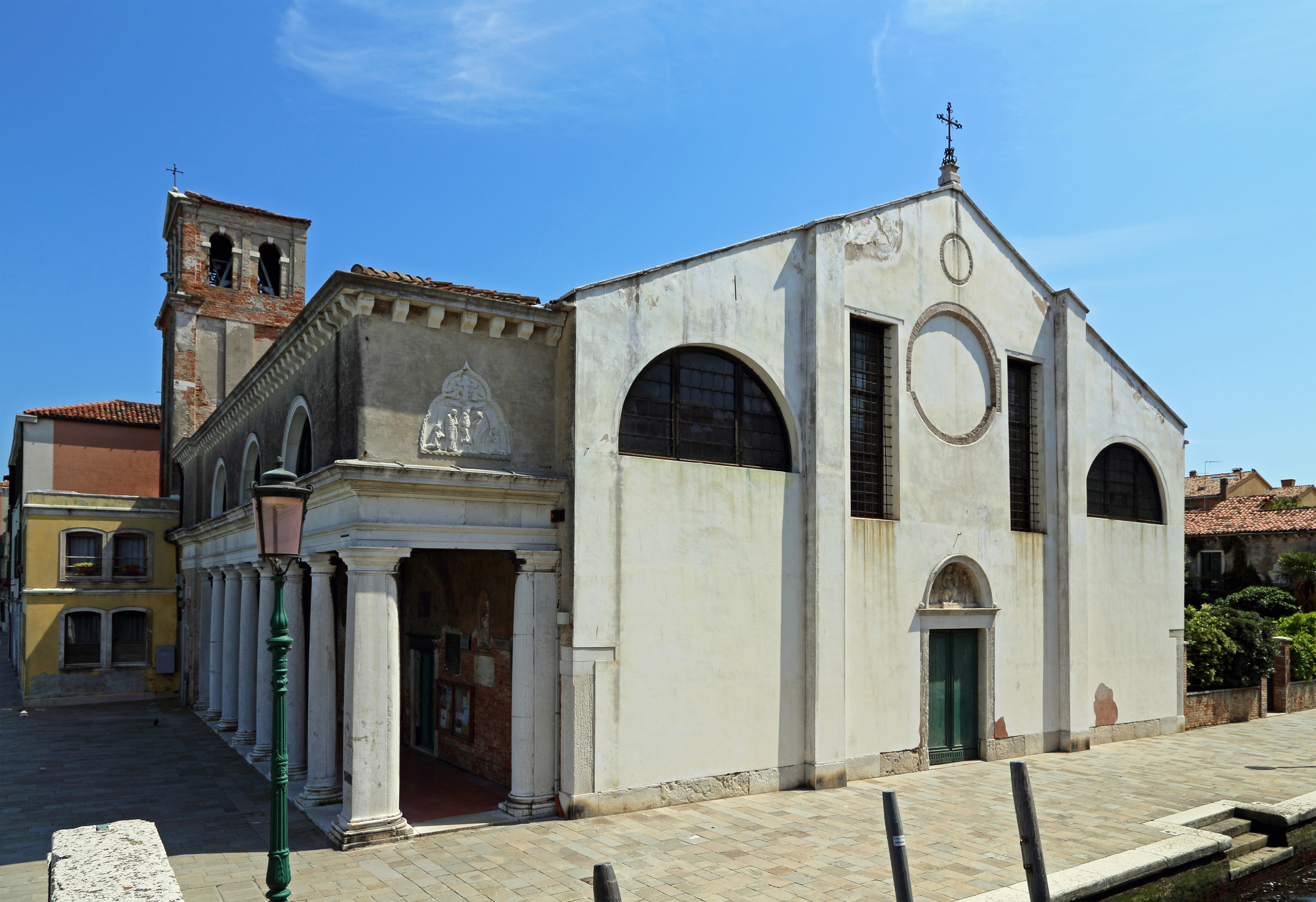
Church of Sant'Eufemia

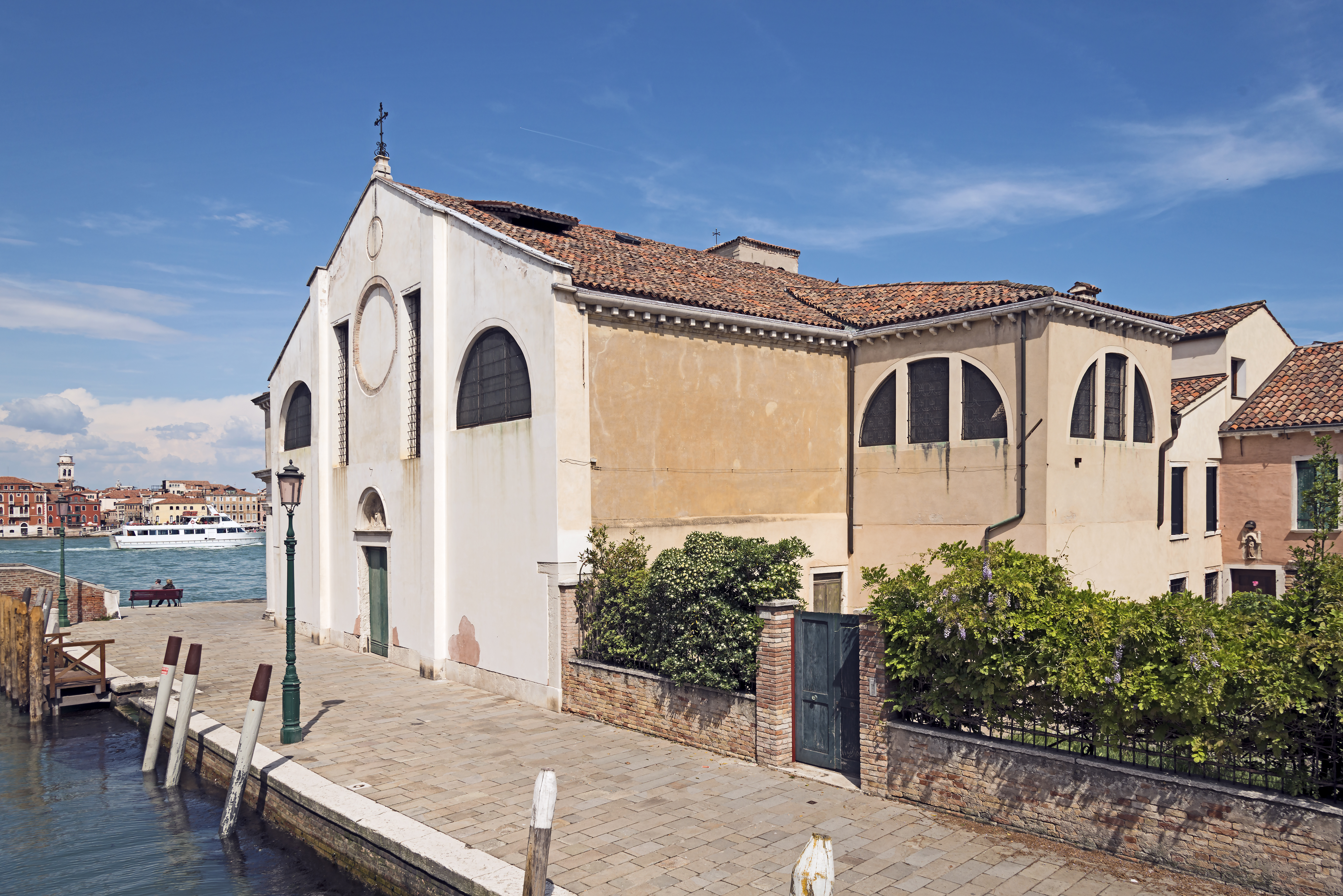
Facade

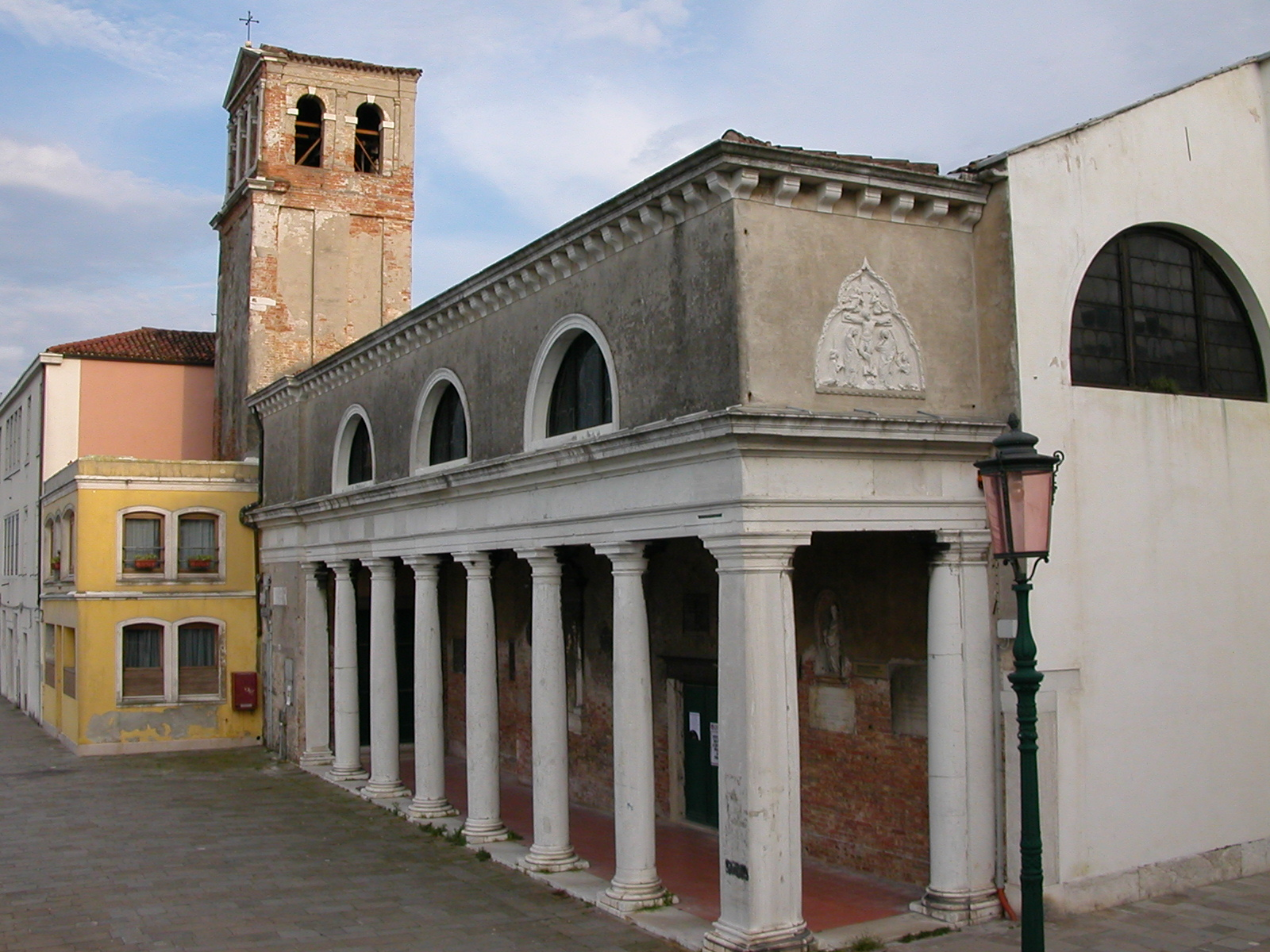
Portico and bell-tower

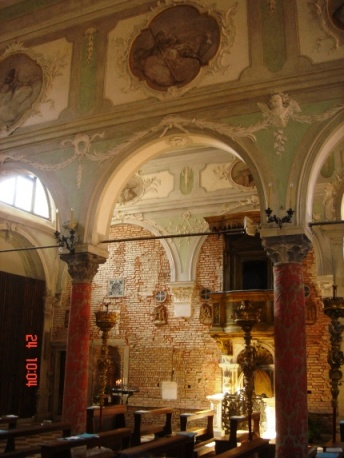
Interior

== Bibliography ==
- Giulio Lorenzetti, Venezia e il suo estuario, 1974, Ed. Lint, Trieste
