= Niccolò Bambini =

Italian painter

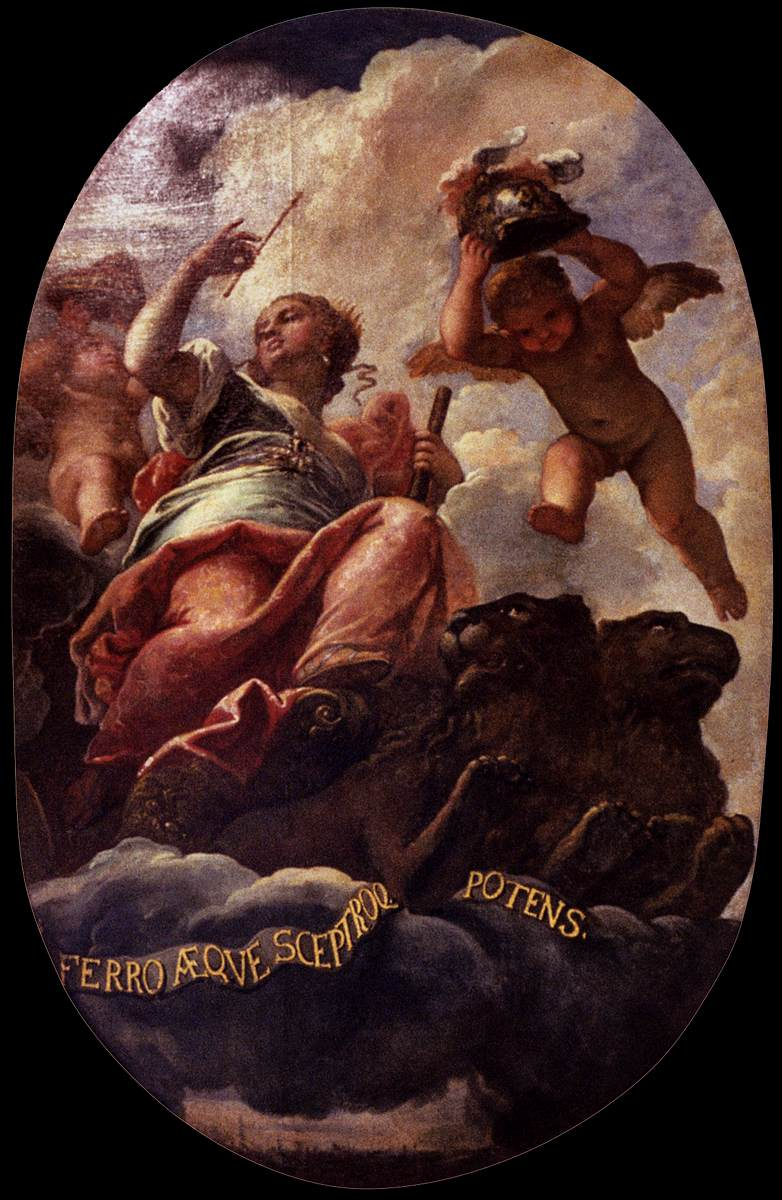
Triumph of Venice, 1682.

Niccolò Bambini (1651–1736) was an Italian painter of the late-Renaissance and early-Baroque periods.

== Biography ==
He was born in Venice in 1651, and first studied under Giulio Mazzoni at Venice. To this period belong the ceiling of the church of S. Moisè, in a poor state of preservation, and an Allegory of Venice in the hall of the Four Doors of the ducal Palace. Later went to Rome, where he became a pupil of Carlo Maratti. On his return to his homeland, seeing that the whole world was running after the paintings of Liberi, he also followed that beautiful way of painting.

An example of his imitations from Liberi is the allegorical ceiling of Ca 'Pesaro (1682). While The Nativity of the Virgin in the church of San Stefano, according to Zanetti, was "conducted following the style of the art school of Rome". However, this painting of porcelain colors and pungent design, however, represented an isolated case. Usually Roman memories are reduced in his paintings to some generic motifs typical of the Maratta's followers. Among his best works are The Adoration of the Magi in St.Zaccaria in Venice, painted in competition with A. Balestra, as well as the decoration of the library hall of the bishop's palace in Udine (1709). In his last period, he approached Sebastiano Ricci so much to be almost confused with him, as in the allegorical compartment with Minerva who Crowns Titus Livius in the ceiling of the library of the patriarchal seminary of Venice. For this reason it cannot be excluded that some works that considered of Ricci's youthful period belong to Nicolo Bambini, especially from the Parma group.

He died in Venice. He had two sons who were painters, Giovanni and Stefano.

== Works ==
Works of Bambini that are found in Venice:

- The Crowning of the Virgin, ceiling in the church of the Hermits;
- Deposition, in St. Marcuola;
- Immaculate, in St. Pantaleone;
- St. Joseph Appears to St. Teresa and The Consecrated Host Flies to St. Teresa, in the church of the Scalzi;
- Four Evangelists, in St. Spirit;
- Our Lady and Three Saints, in St. Stae;
- The Virtue that Drives Away Vices and The Time That Discovers the Truth, in the patriarchal palace;
- Agar in the Desert, at Palazzo Barbaro-Curtis;
- Stories of St. Romualdo, at the Museo Correr.

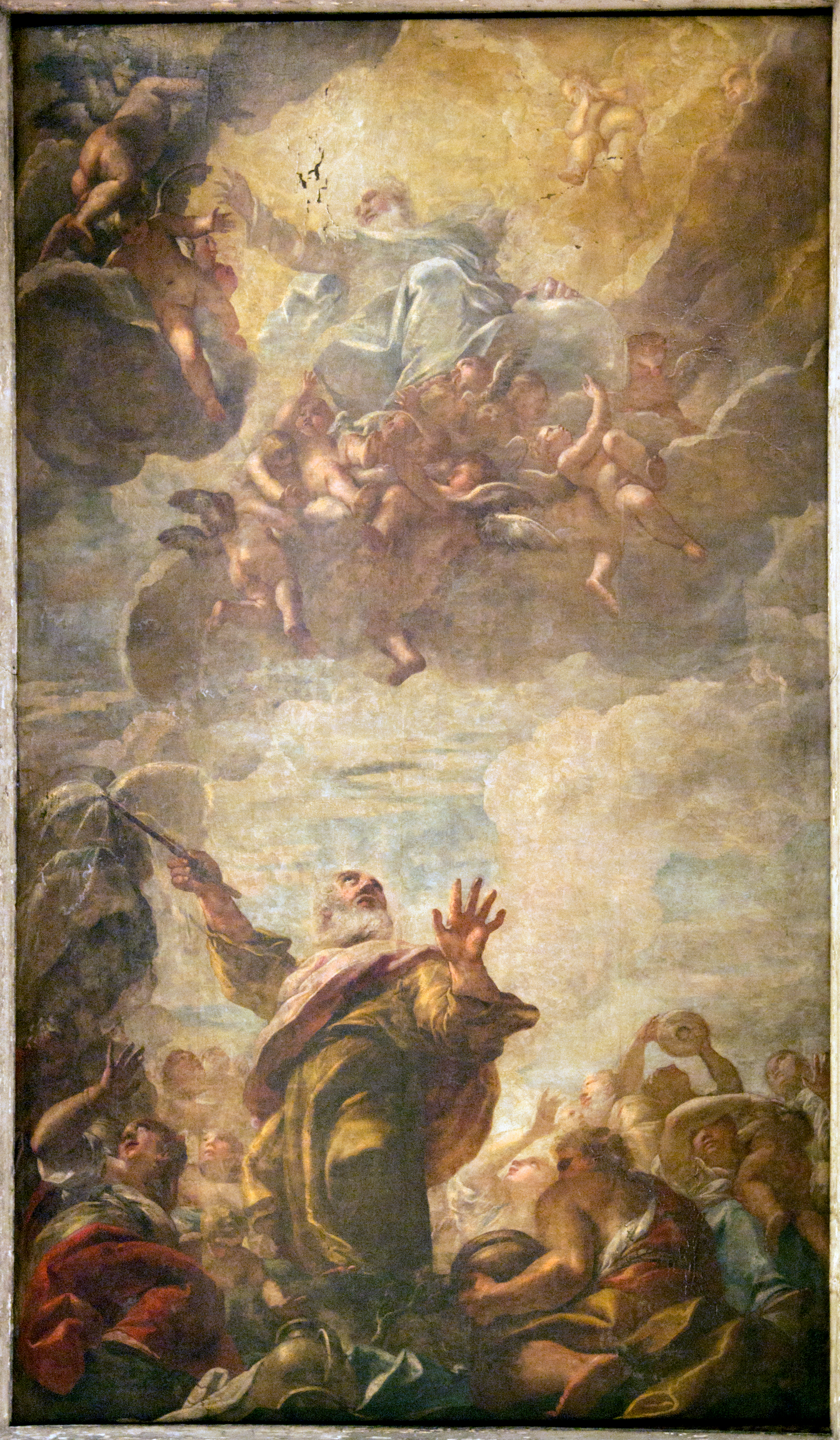
Moses striking the rock San Moisè

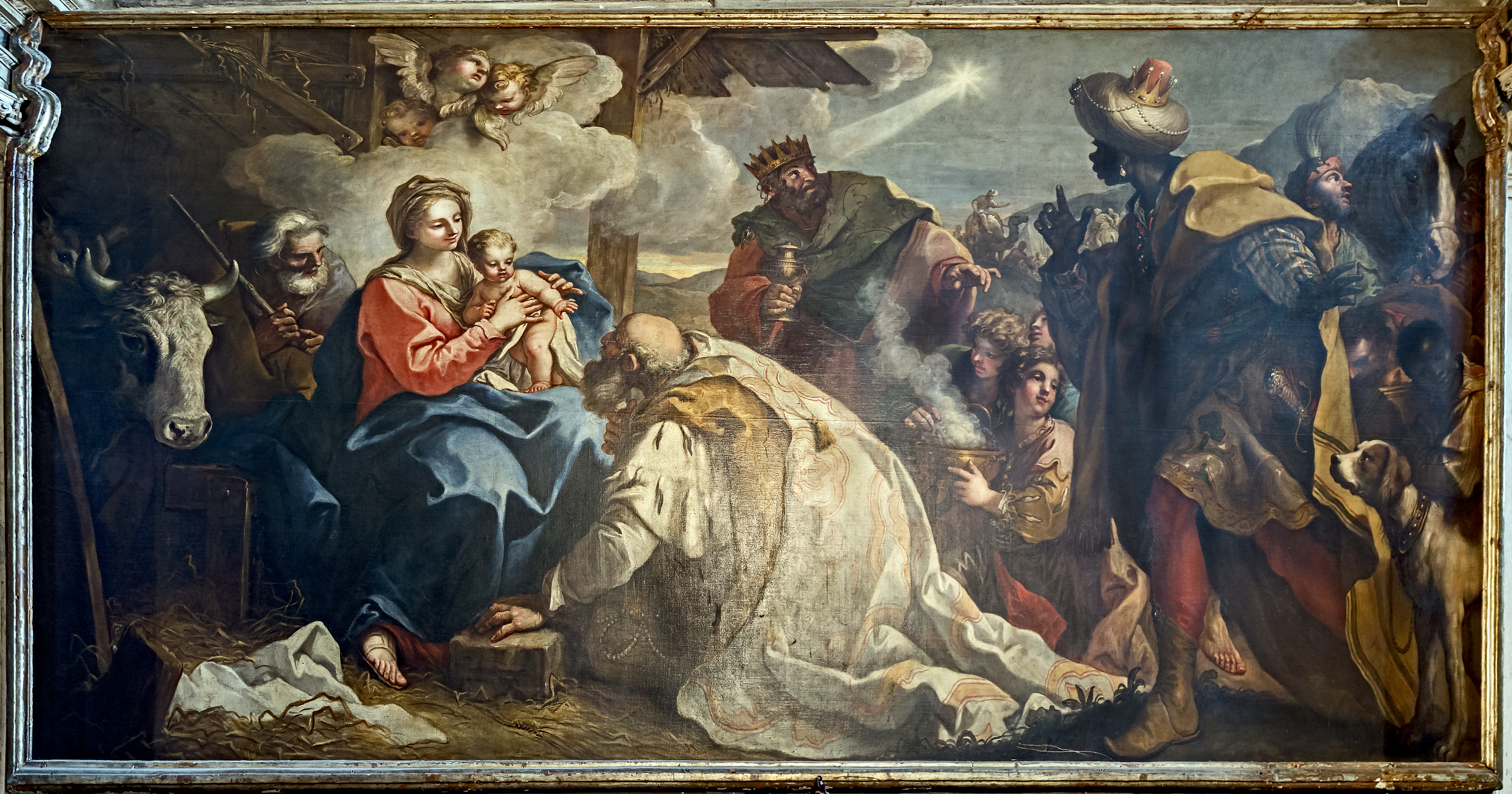
Adoration of the Magi San Zaccaria, Venice 1717

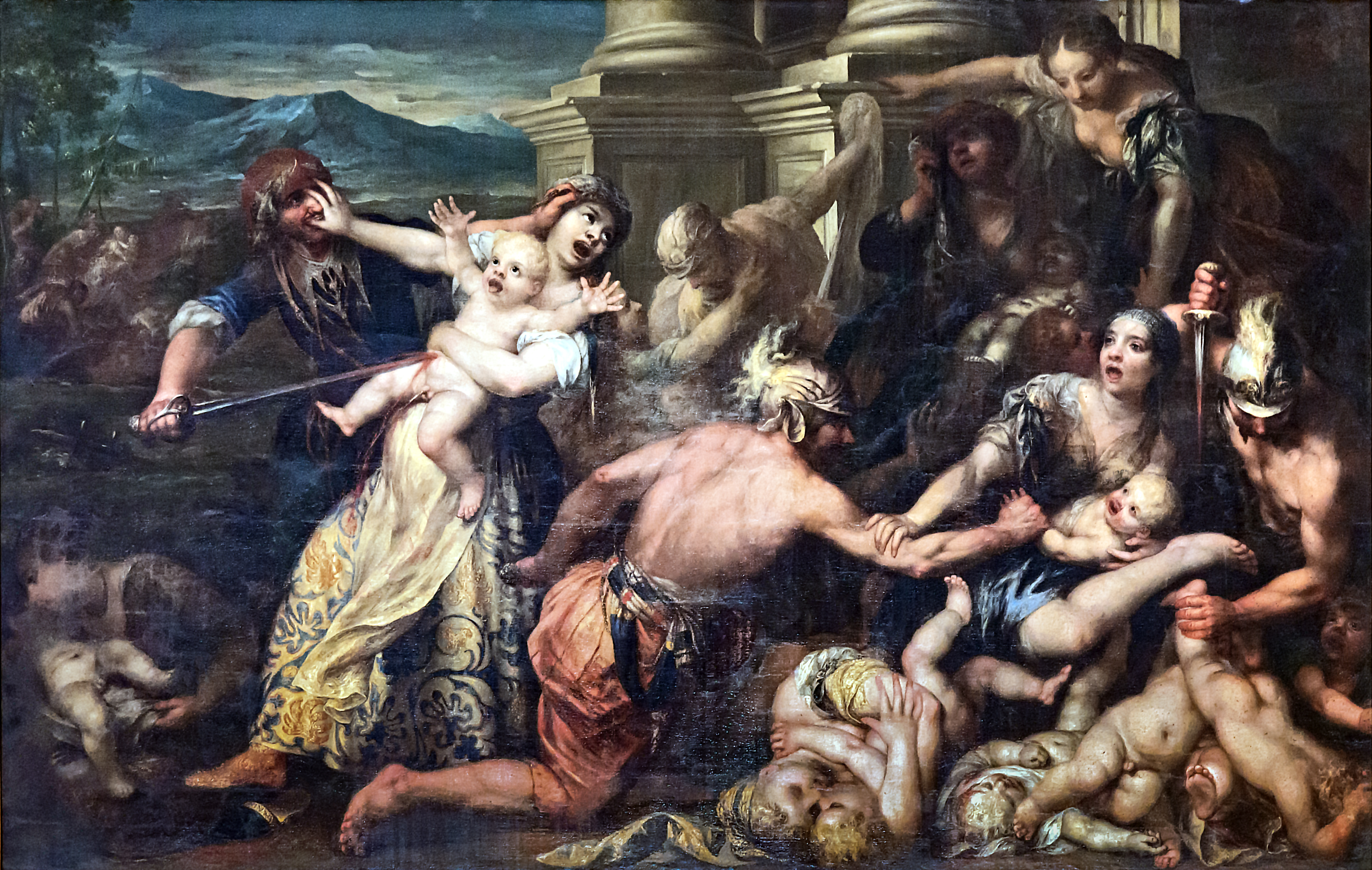
Santa Maria Gloriosa dei Frari

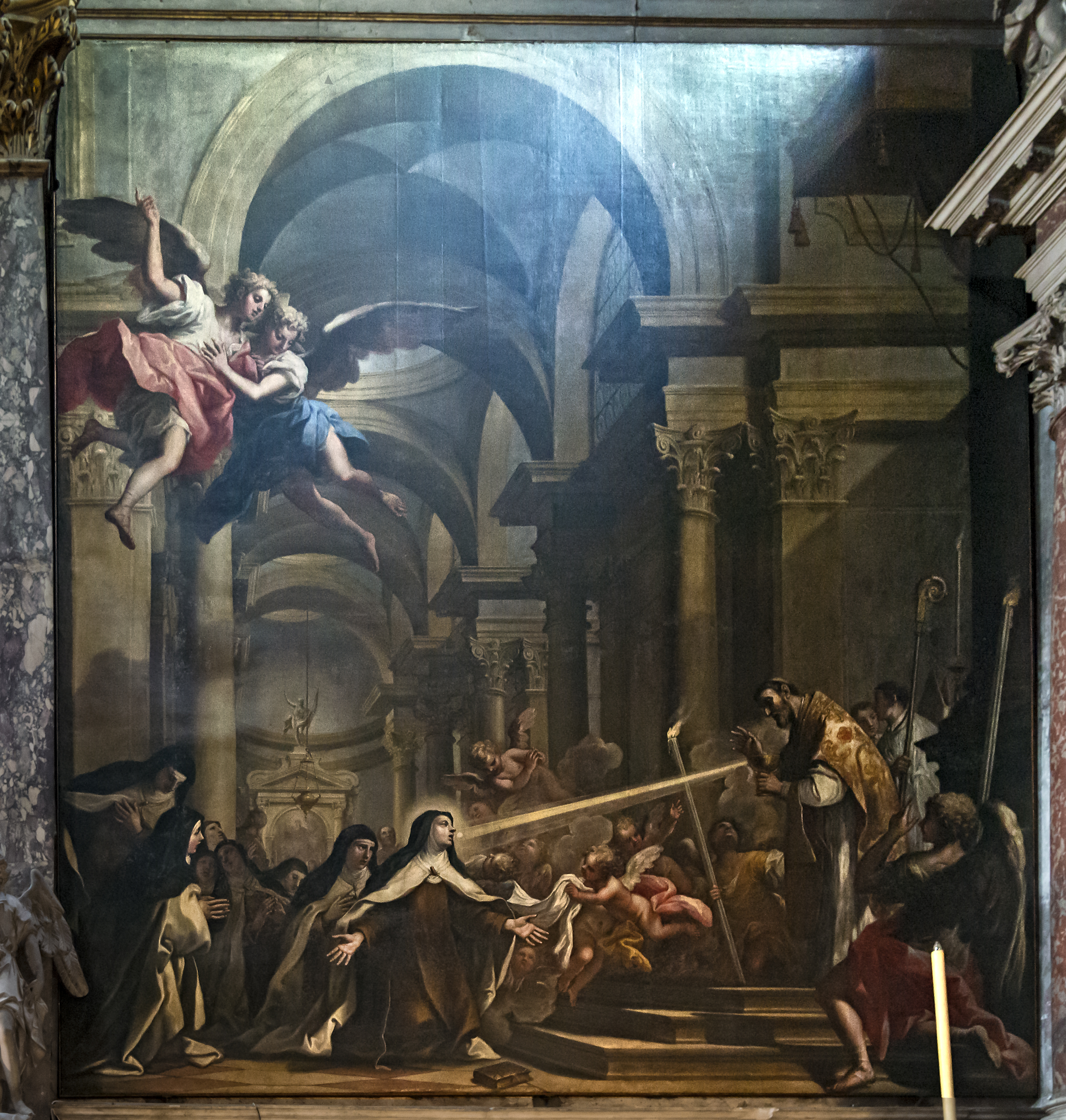
Miraculous communion of Saint Teresa Scalzi, Venice

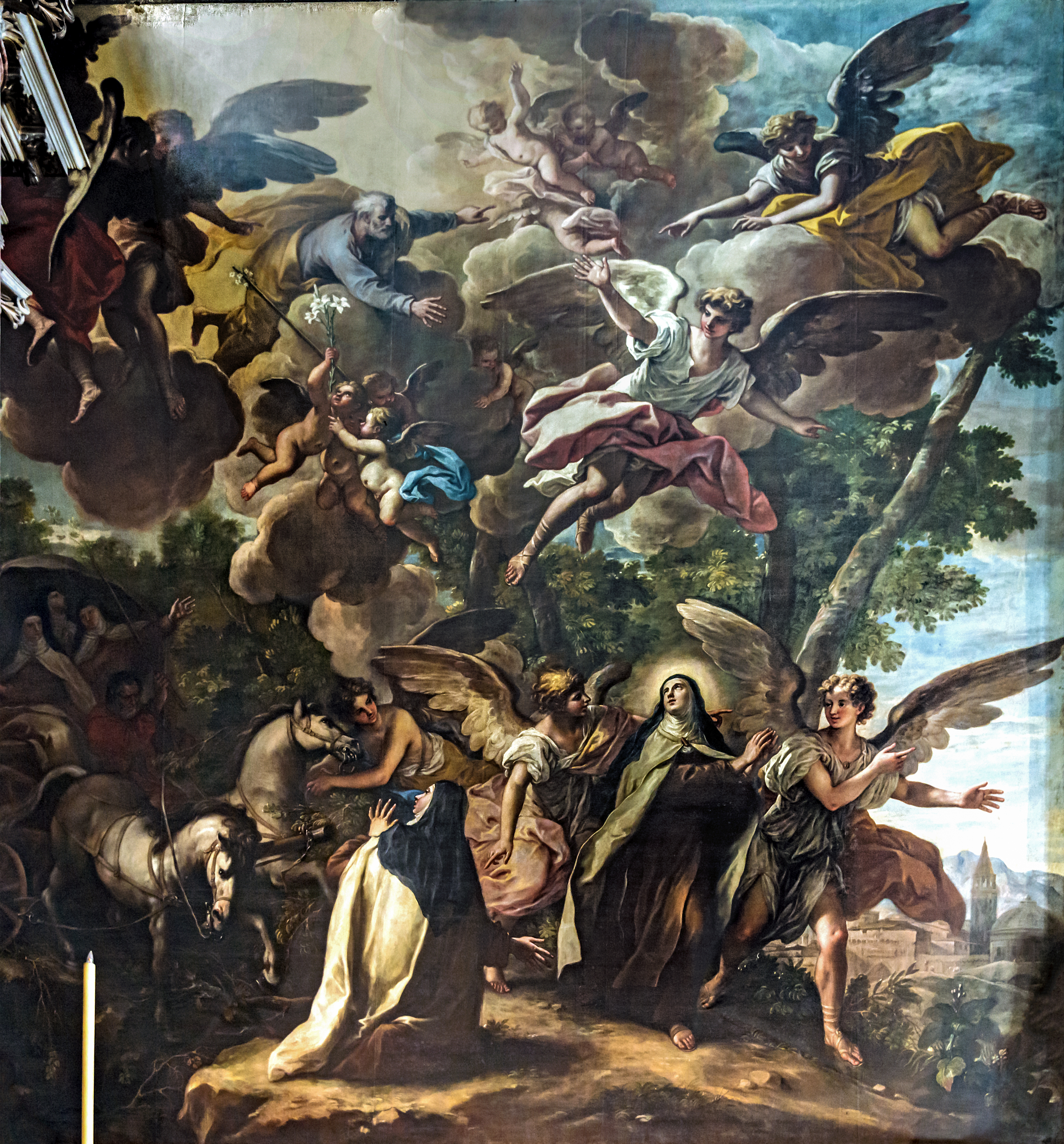
St. Joseph appears in Santa Teresa Scalzi, Venice

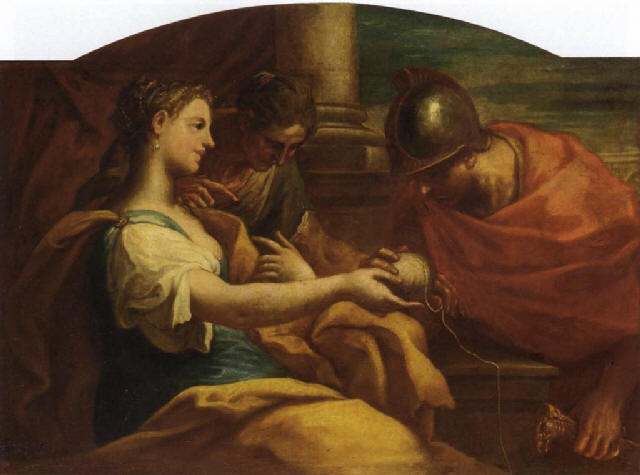
Ariadne and Theseus

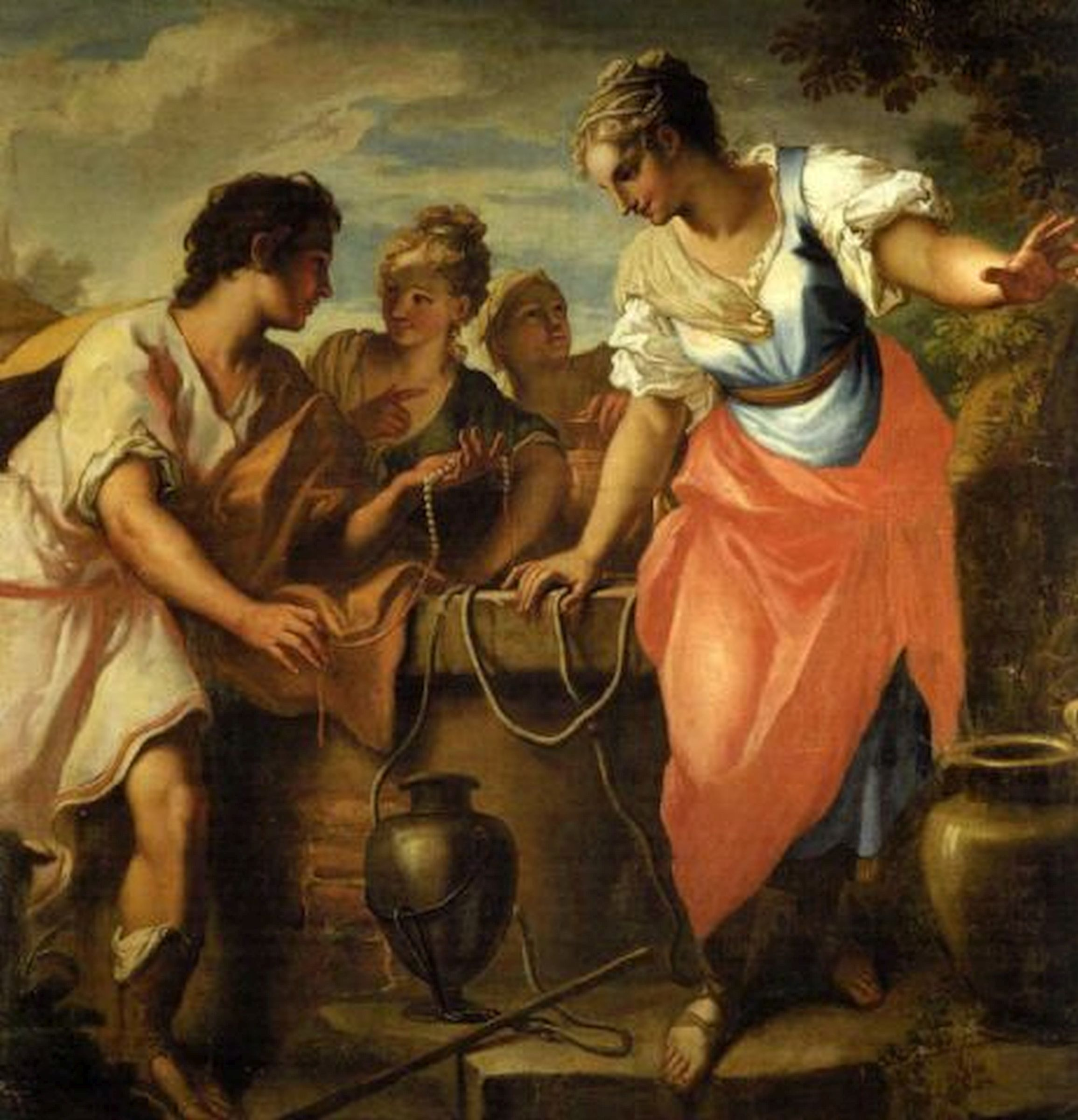
Rebecca at the well

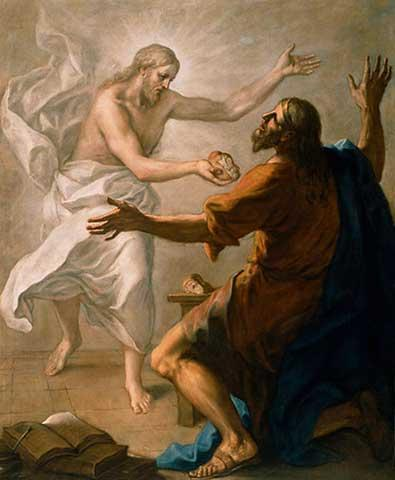
Communion of the Apostle Jacob

Achilles at Skyros

Abduction of the Sabine Women

== Sources ==
- Bryan, Michael (1886). Robert Edmund Graves (ed.). Dictionary of Painters and Engravers, Biographical and Critical. Vol. I: A-K. London: George Bell and Sons. p. 74.
