= Scalzi, Venice =

Church in Venice

Chiesa degli Scalzi
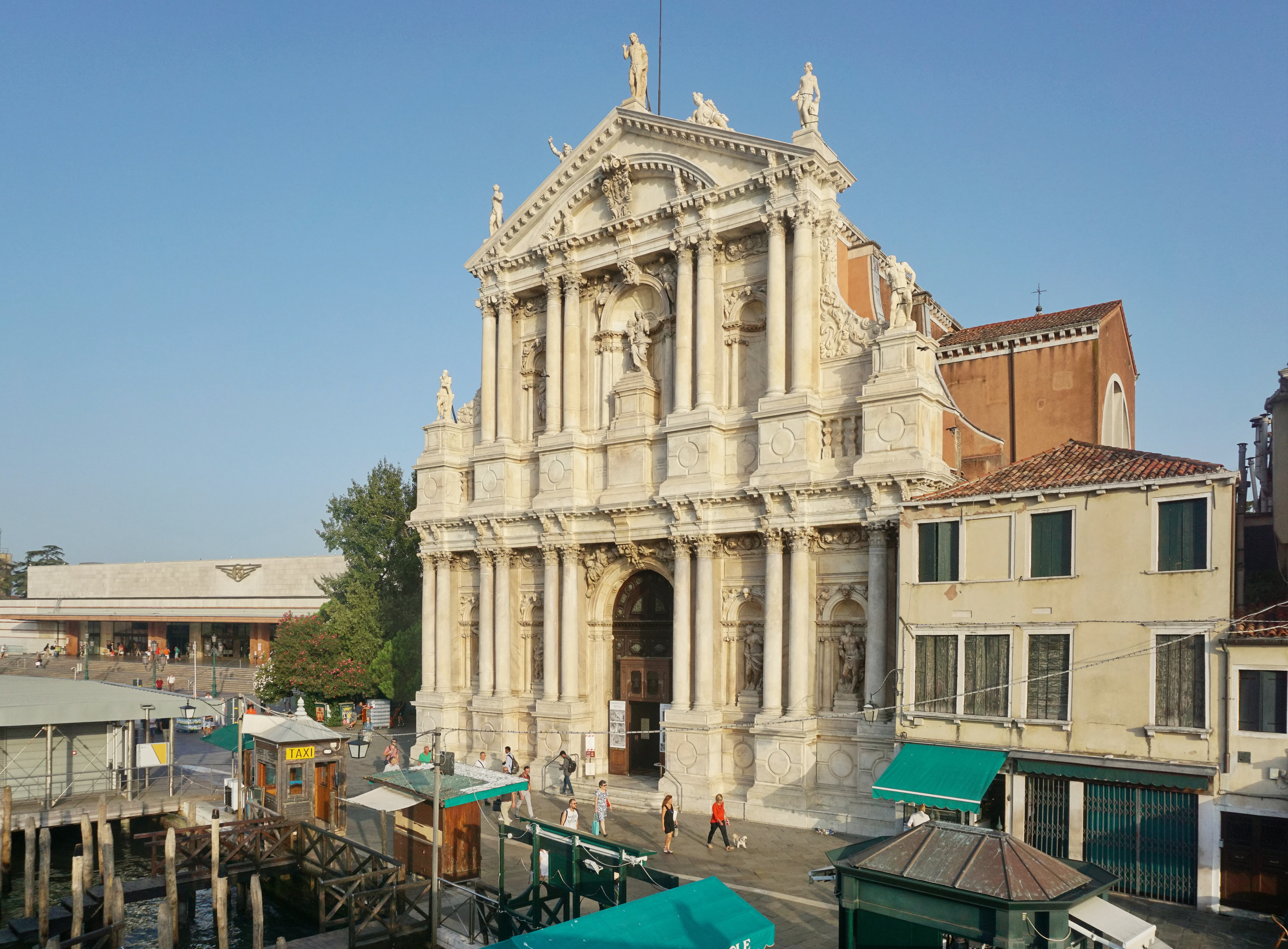
- Chiesa degli Scalzi is located near Venezia Santa Lucia railway station

- Location within Venice Location within Italy

Religion
- Affiliation: Roman Catholic
- Province: Venice

Location
- Location: Venice, Italy
- Coordinates: 45°26′28″N 12°19′20″E

Architecture
- Architects: Baldassarre Longhena, Giuseppe Sardi (facade)
- Type: Church
- Style: Baroque
- Completed: 1680

Santa Maria di Nazareth is a Roman Catholic Carmelite church in Venice, northern Italy. It is also called Church of the Scalzi (Italian: Chiesa degli Scalzi) being the seat in the city of the Discalced Carmelites religious order (Scalzi in Italian means 'barefoot'). Located in the sestiere of Cannaregio, near Venezia Santa Lucia railway station, it was built in the mid-17th century to the designs of Baldassarre Longhena and completed in the last decades of that century.

== Exterior ==
The facade in Venetian Late Baroque style, was financed by the aristocrat Gerolamo Cavazza, and erected by Giuseppe Sardi, from 1672 to 1680. The four first-floor statues, the statue of the Virgin and Child, and the statues of Saint Catherine of Siena and St Thomas Aquinas are sculpted by Bernardo Falconi.

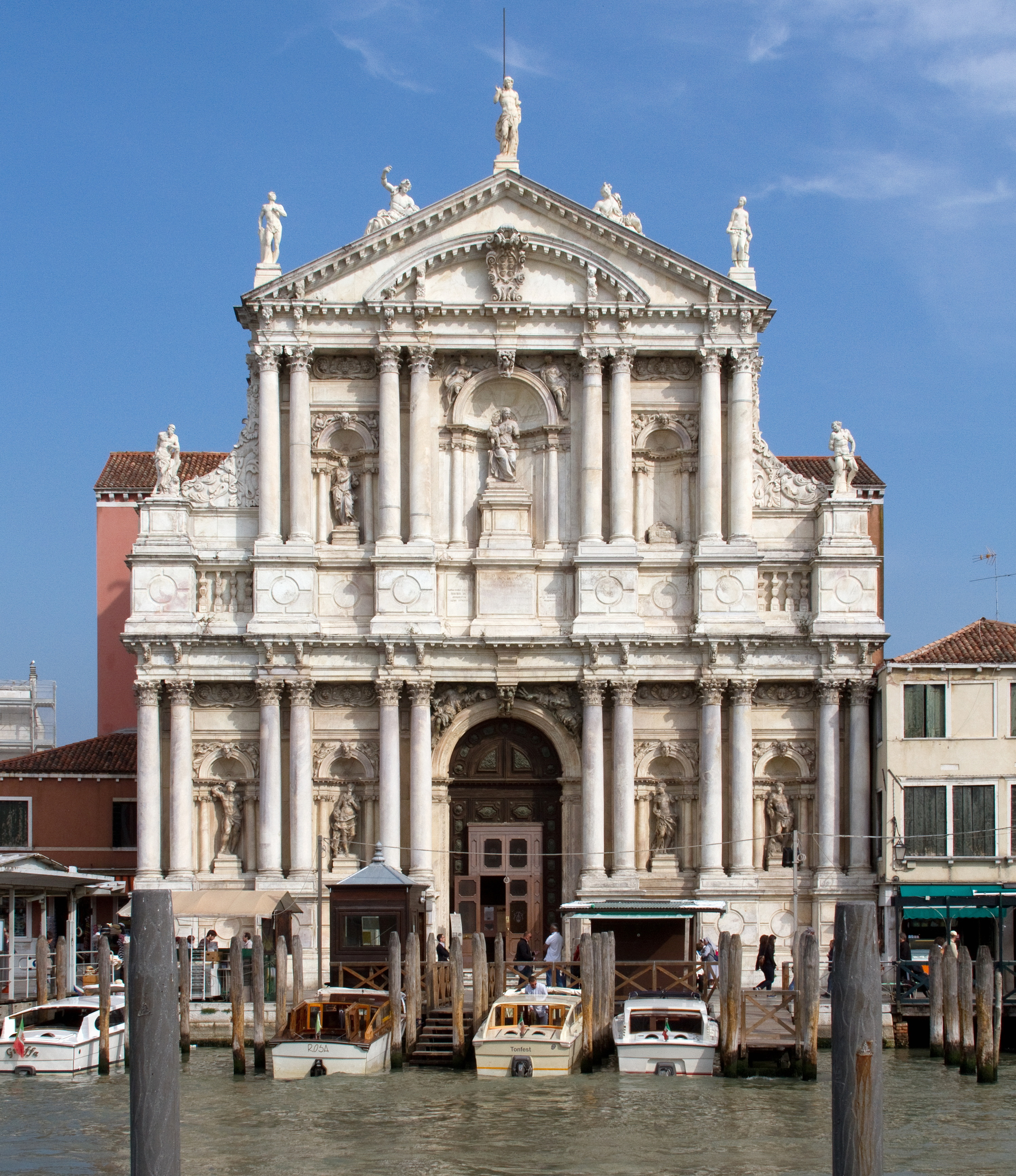
Frontal view of the facade

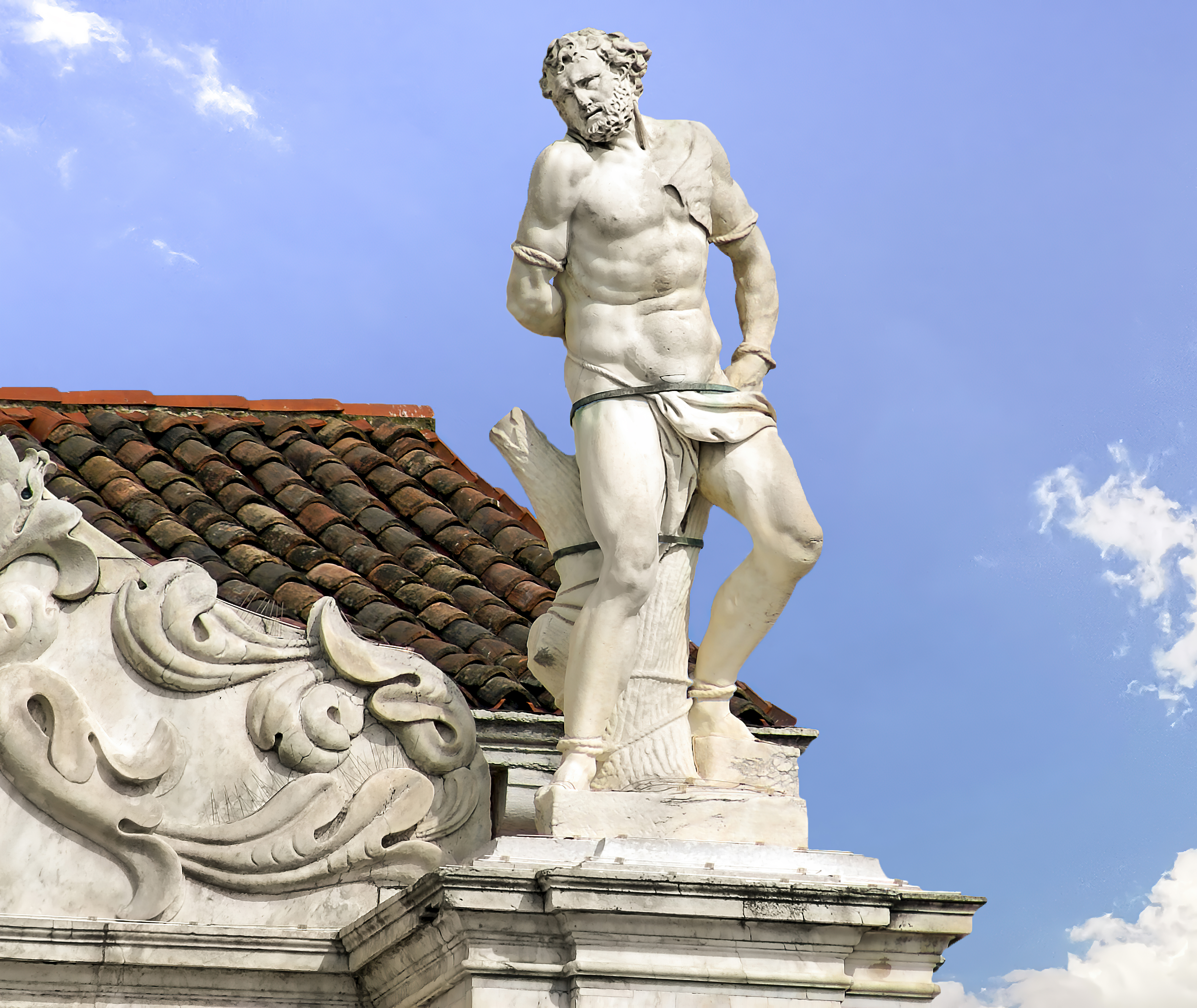
Bartholomew the Apostle by Bernardo Falconi

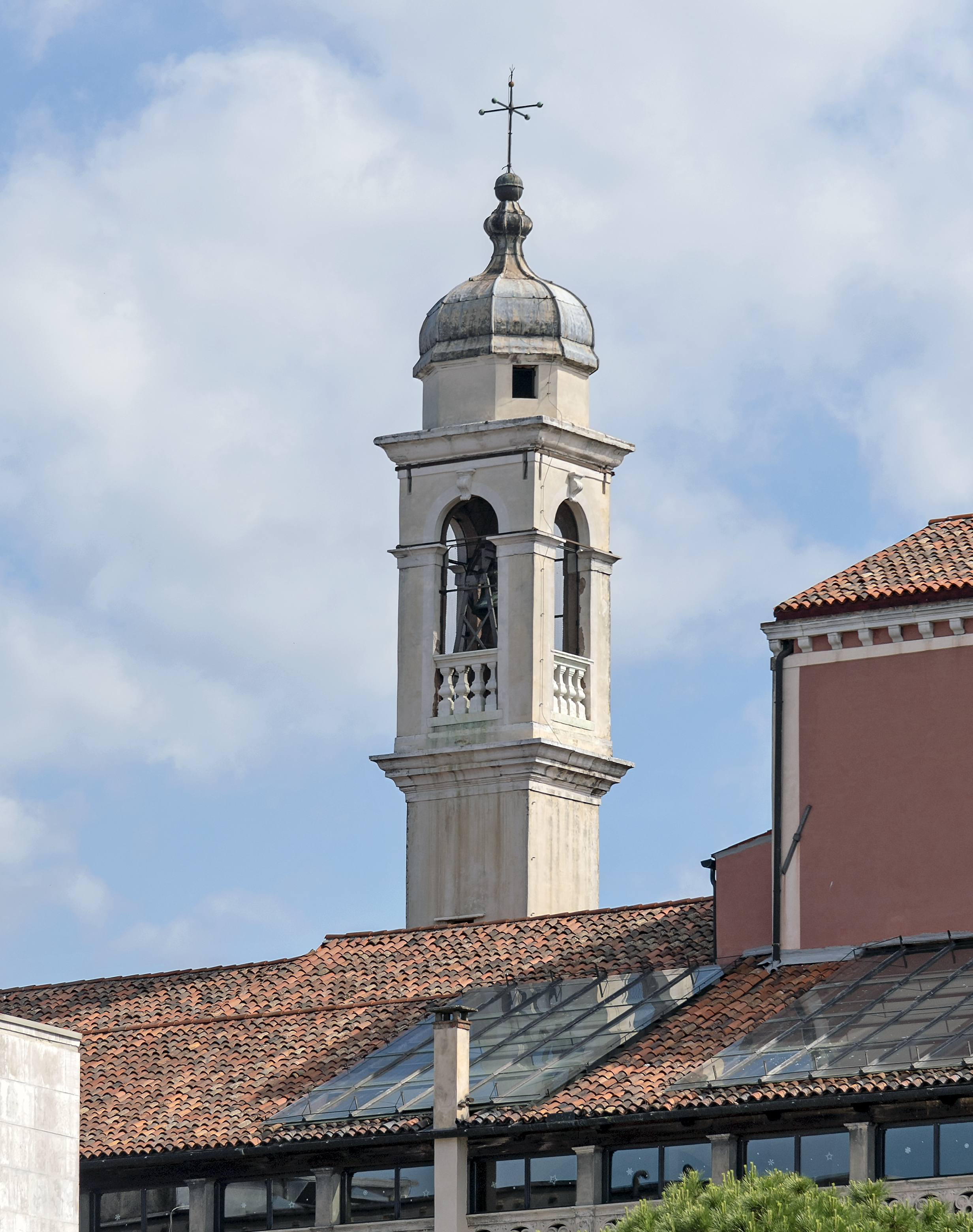
Campanile

== Interior ==
The first chapel to the right has a statue of St John of the Cross, attributed to Falconi. The statues of Faith, Hope, and Charity are by Tommaso Rues. The third chapel on the left has a statue of St Sebastian (1669) with bronze bas-reliefs also attributed to Falconi.

=== The vault ===
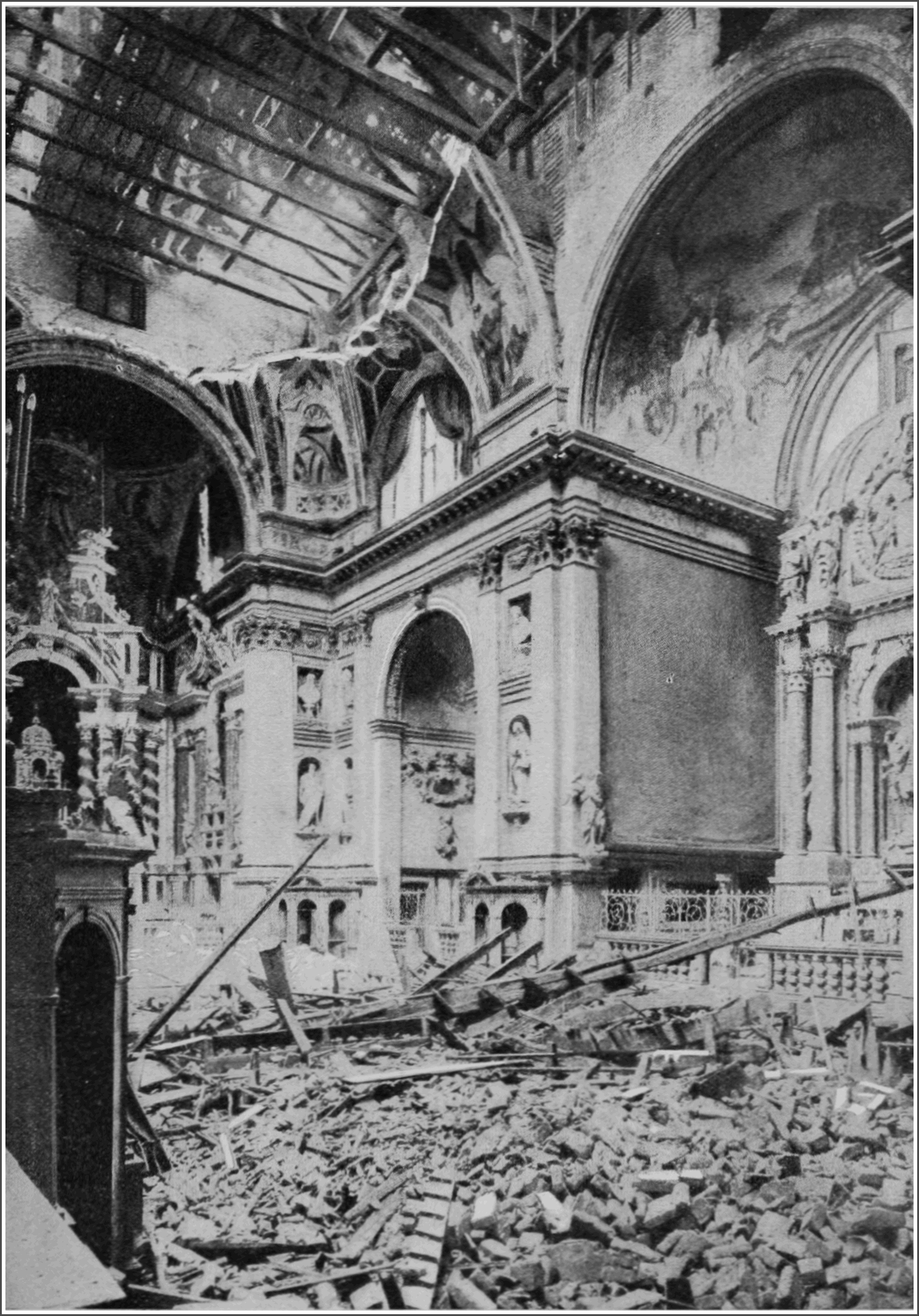
Photo taken of interior after Austrian bombing on October 24, 1915

The vault of the church nave once housed a major fresco by Giambattista Tiepolo depicting the Translation of the House of Loreto. Tiepolo had previously worked in the church, decorating the vaults of the chapel of St Teresa in 1727–1730 and the chapel of Crucifix in 1732–1733. He had also painted a Virgin of Mount Carmel for the Carmelite church of St Aponal and so was well-known to the order. Thus in 1743, Tiepolo arranged to work alongside Gerolamo Mengozzi Colonna, who provided quadratura for 1500 ducats; Tiepolo painted a daring vision of the flying House, transported by angels, which repels falling winged figures of heresy and falsehood (completed in 1745). An Austrian bombardment from the mainland destroyed the frescoes on October 24, 1915. From 1929 to 1933, Ettore Tito painted canvases and frescoes to repair the damage. The remains of the fragments of Tiepolo's work are now in the Gallerie dell'Accademia. It is possible to see a real and complete view of this work in a 1914 picture by James Anderson, a 1914 copy by Mariano Fortuny, and a 2020 drawing by Olivier Maceratesi.

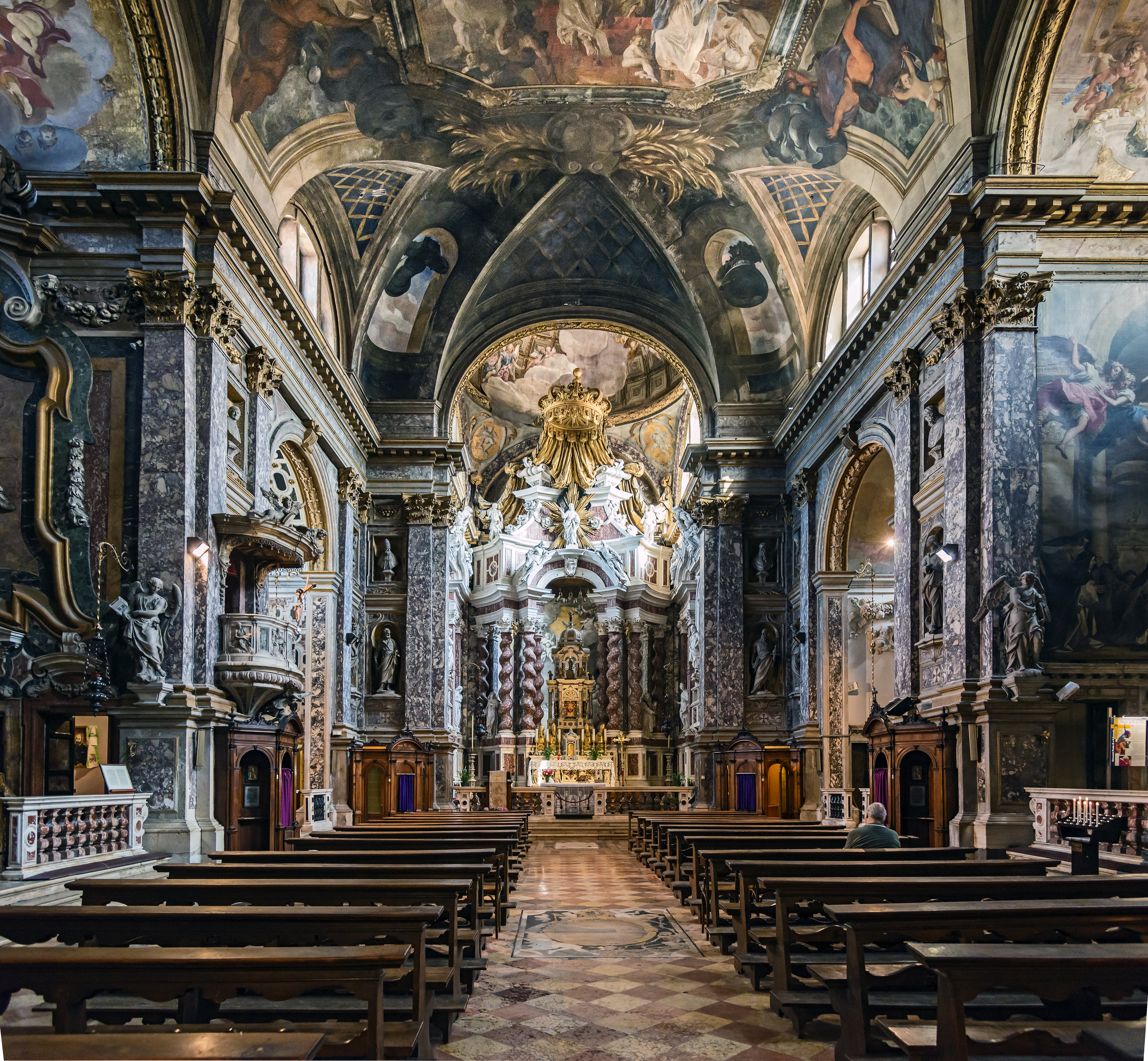
The nave toward the Baroque main altar

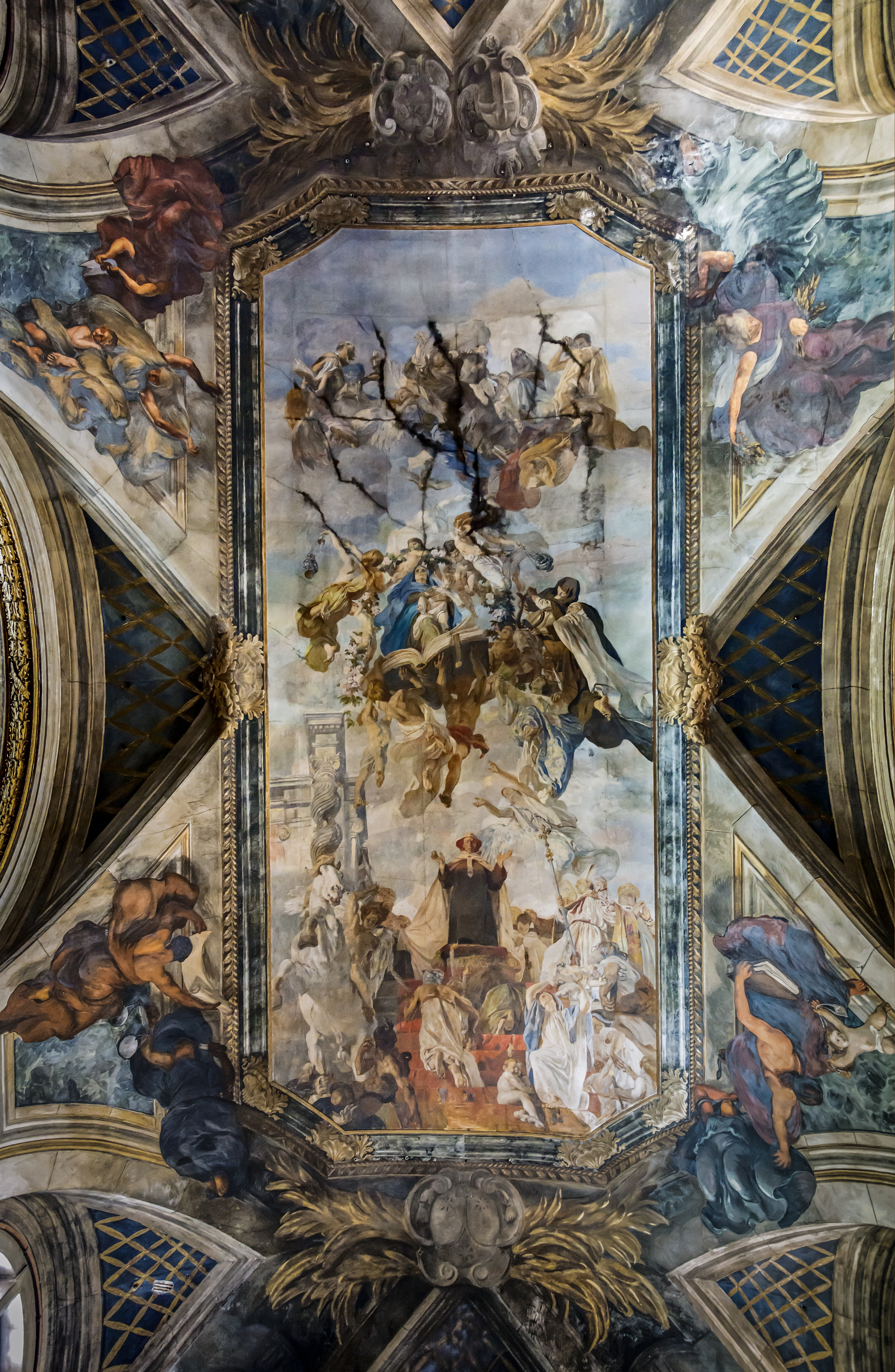
Ceiling by Ettore Tito

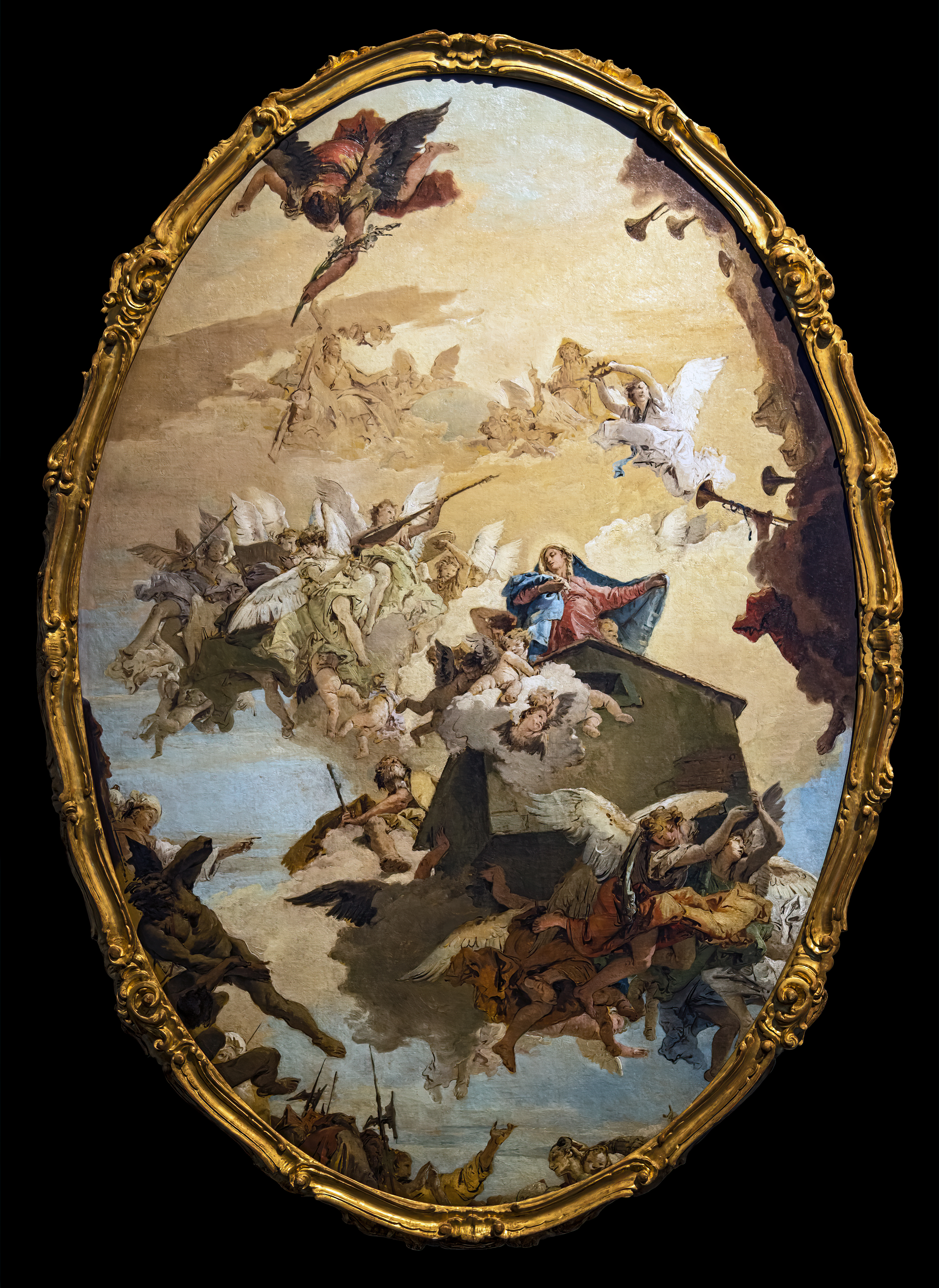
Transportation of the Holy House of Loreto, now in the Gallerie dell'Accademia

=== Inside facade ===
Above the door: organ with carved and gilded decorations and reliefs. Above the organ: lunette Santa Teresa crowned by the Savior (18th century) by G. Lazzarini.

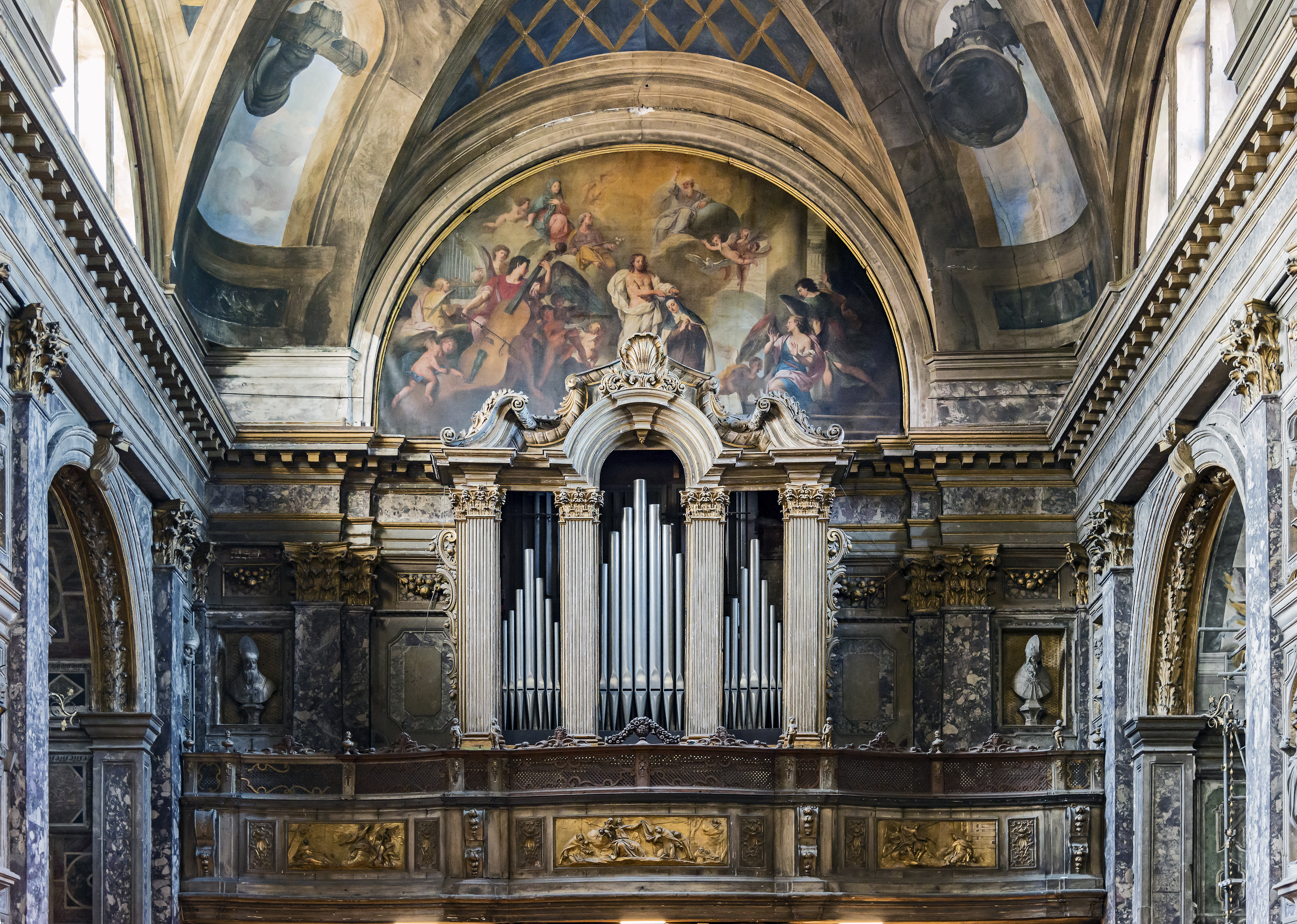
Inside facade with organ

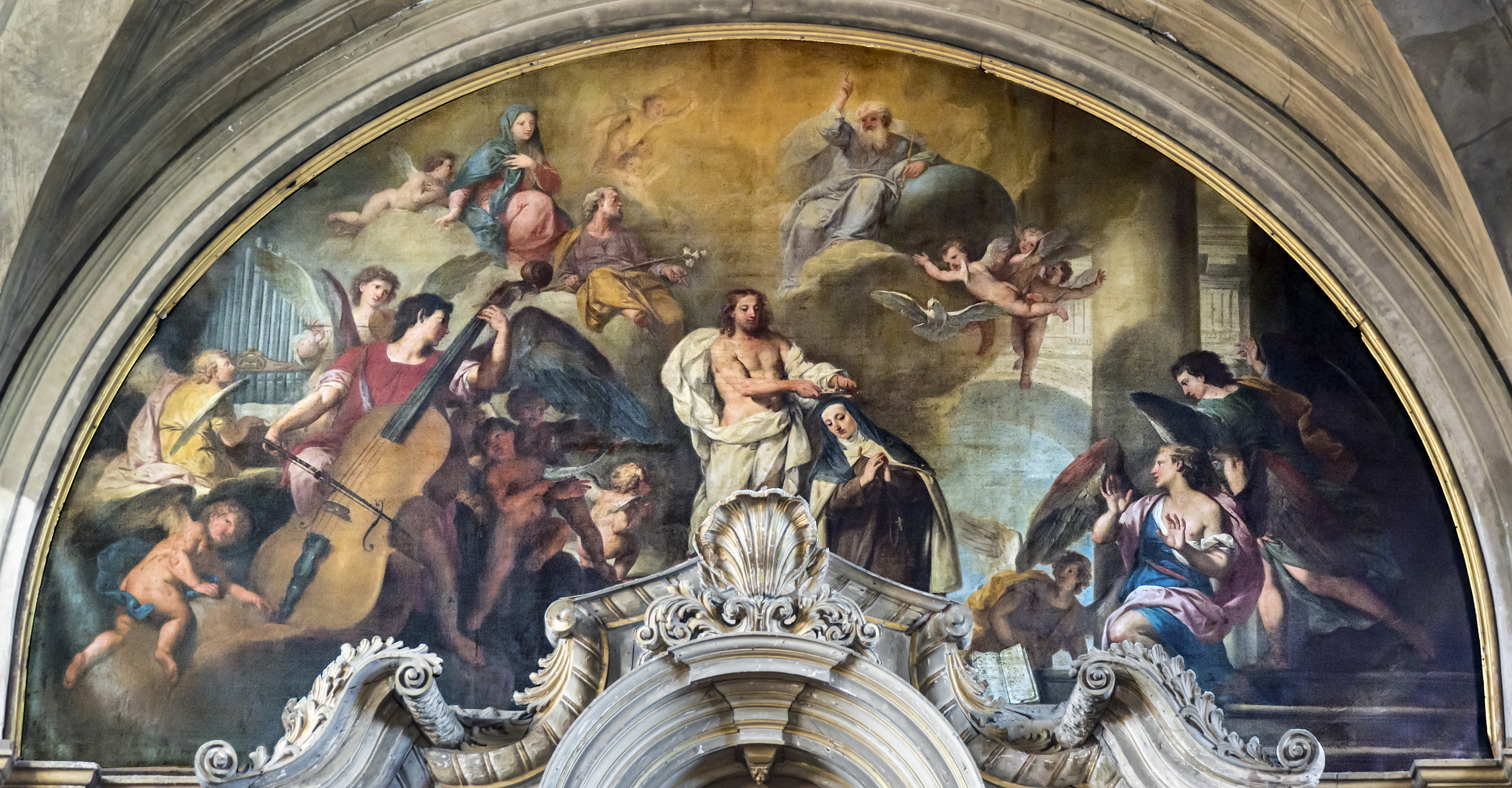
Santa Teresa incoronata dal Salvatore by Gregorio Lazzarini

=== The Choir ===
The altar was completed by Giuseppe Pozzo. Choir ceiling by Giuseppe and Domenico Valeriani.

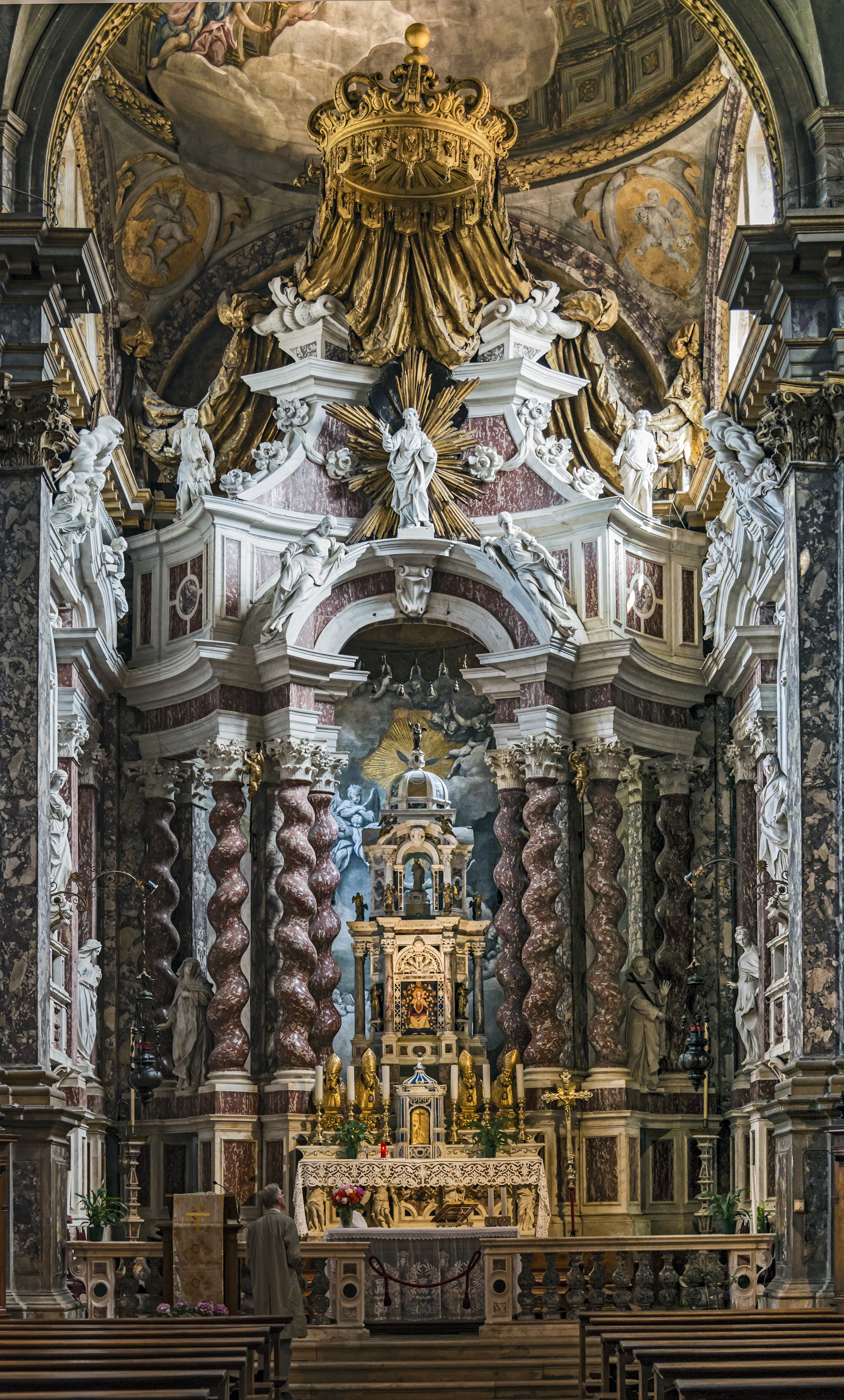
Main Altar

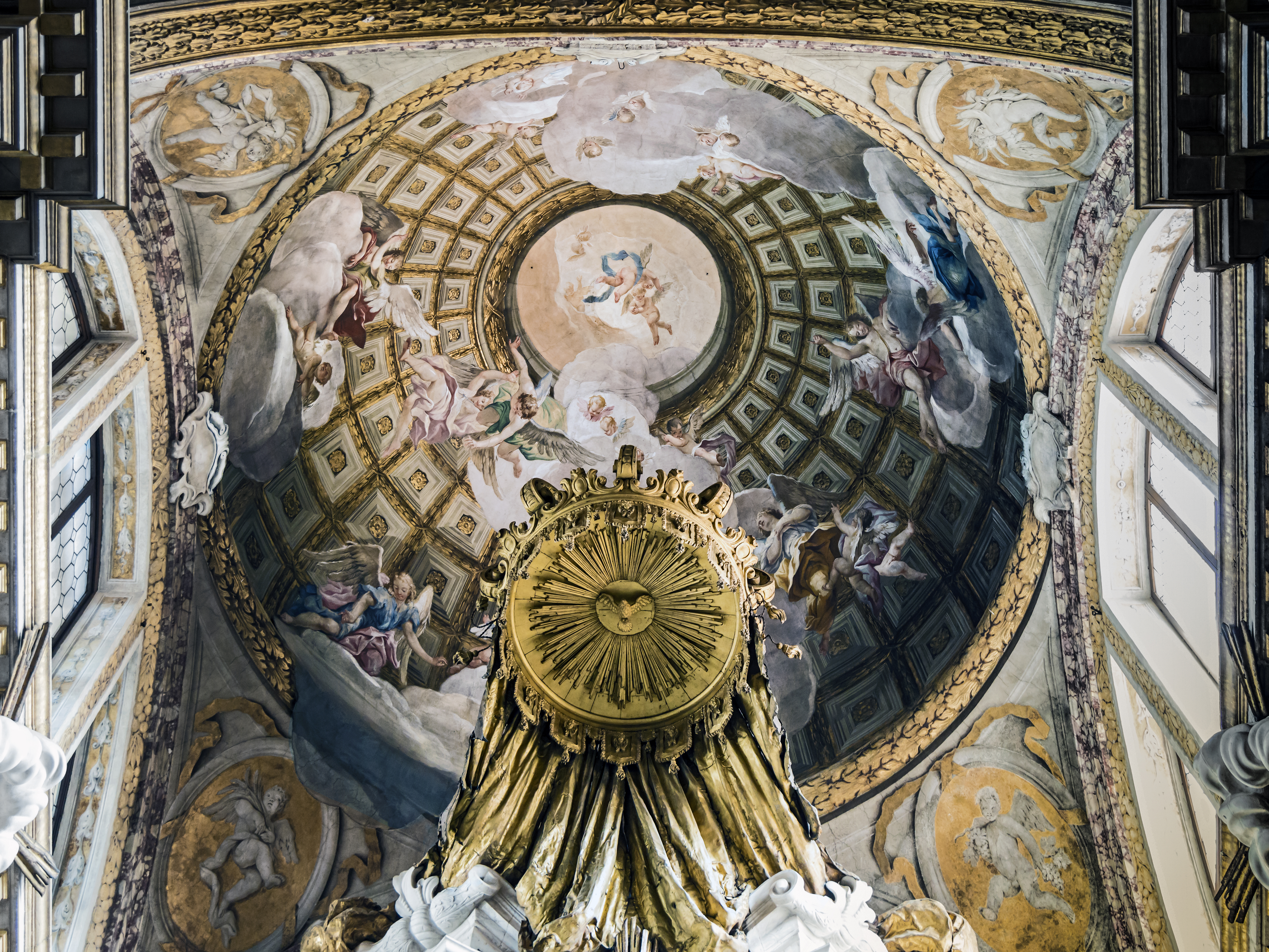
Choir Ceiling

=== Chapels ===
==== Chapel Mora ====
Attributed to the Mora family. Built by Baldassare Longhena. The altarpiece with four columns of black jasper shows a statue of Saint John the Baptist in Carrara marble (late seventeenth century) by Melchior Barthel. A ceiling fresco depicts the eternal Father in glory (seventeenth century) by Pietro Liberi. Giambattista Mora is buried at the foot of the altar.

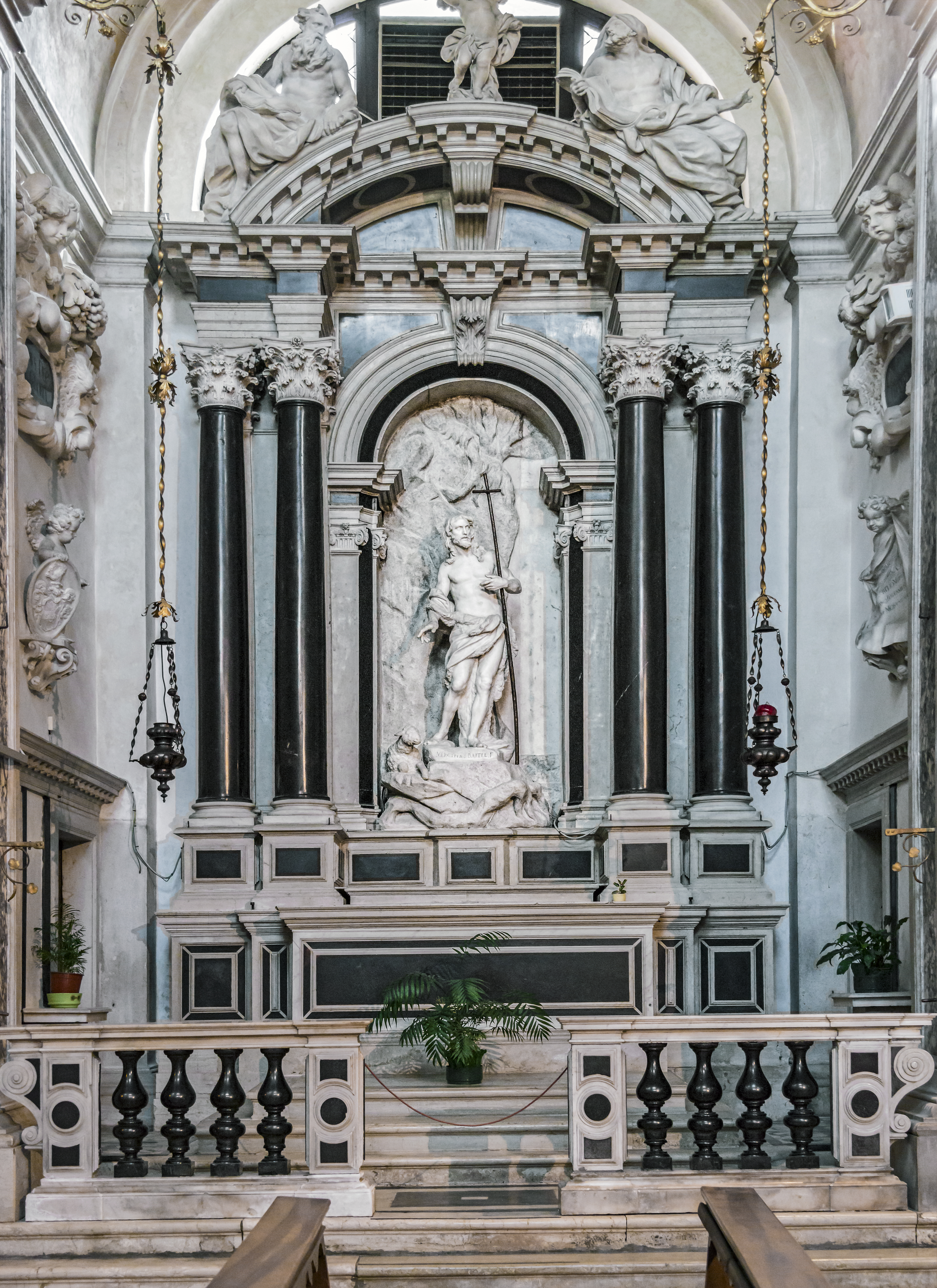
Chapel Mora by Baldassare Longhena.

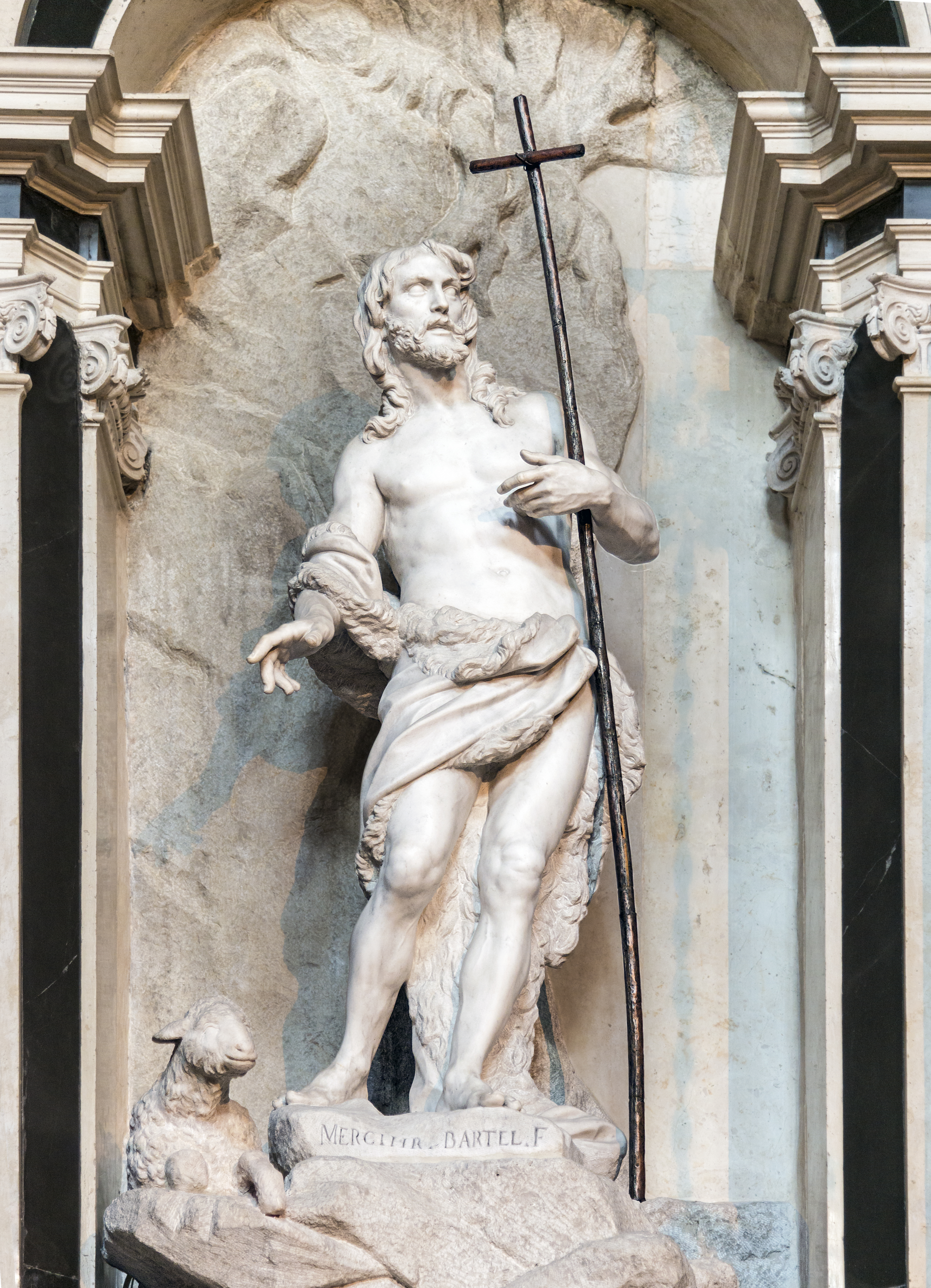
John the Baptist by Melchior Barthel

==== Chapel Ruzzini ====
Attributed to the Ruzzini family, the altar was built and designed by Giuseppe Pozzo. The altarpiece, Ecstasy of Santa Teresa, (1697) was created by Heinrich Meyring. On the vault, a fresco titled The Gloria of St. Teresa (1720–1725) was painted by Giovanni Battista Tiepolo. The side walls feature two paintings by Niccolò Bambini. The left painting is Saint Joseph appears to Saint Teresa and saves her from a dangerous encounter, and on the right is The miracle of the host, which depicts the consecrated host miraculously detaches itself from the priest's hands to wait for Saint Teresa (late 17th century).

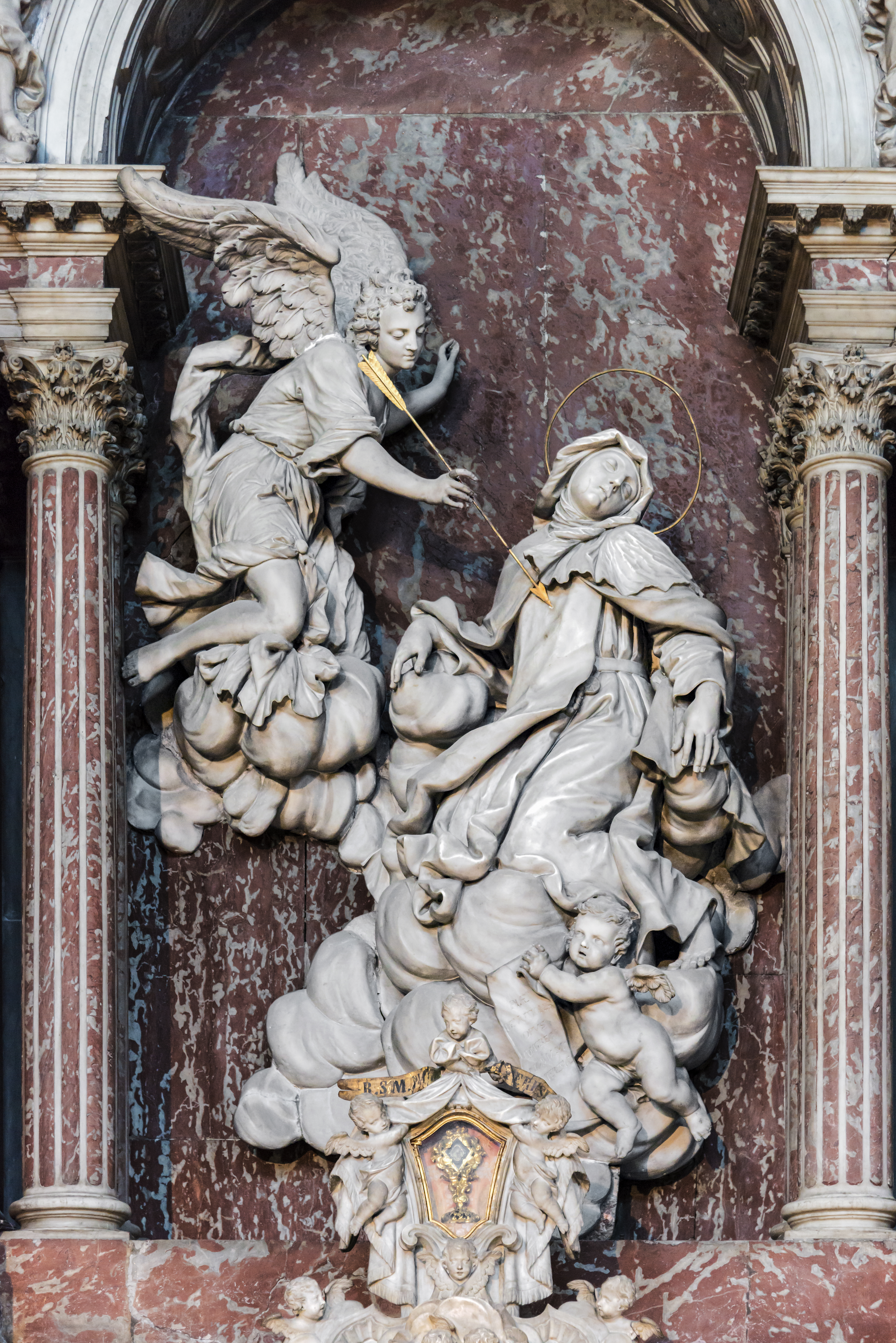
St Theresa in Extasis by Heinrich Meyring (1697)

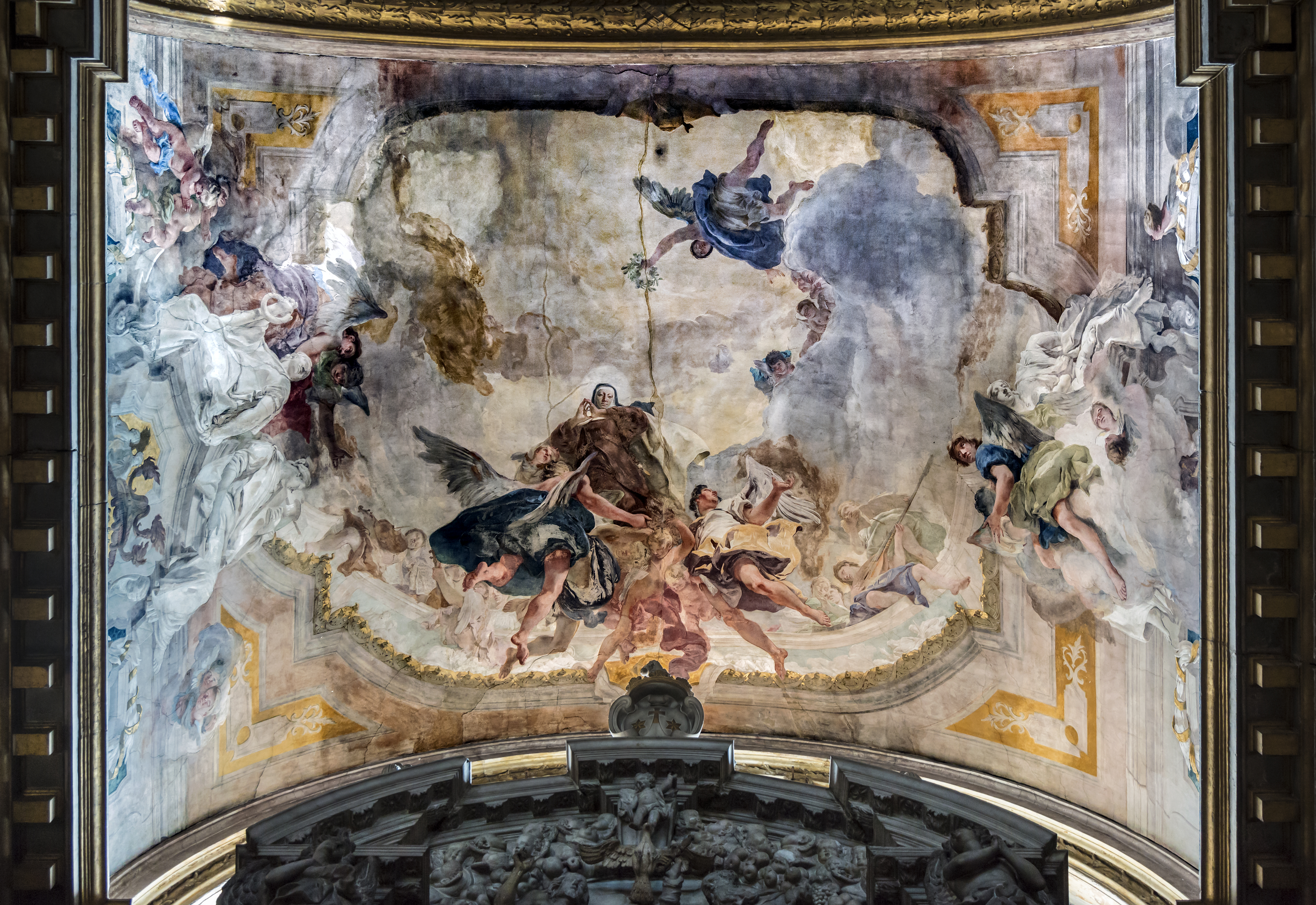
The Gloria of St. Teresa Giovanni Batista Tiepolo

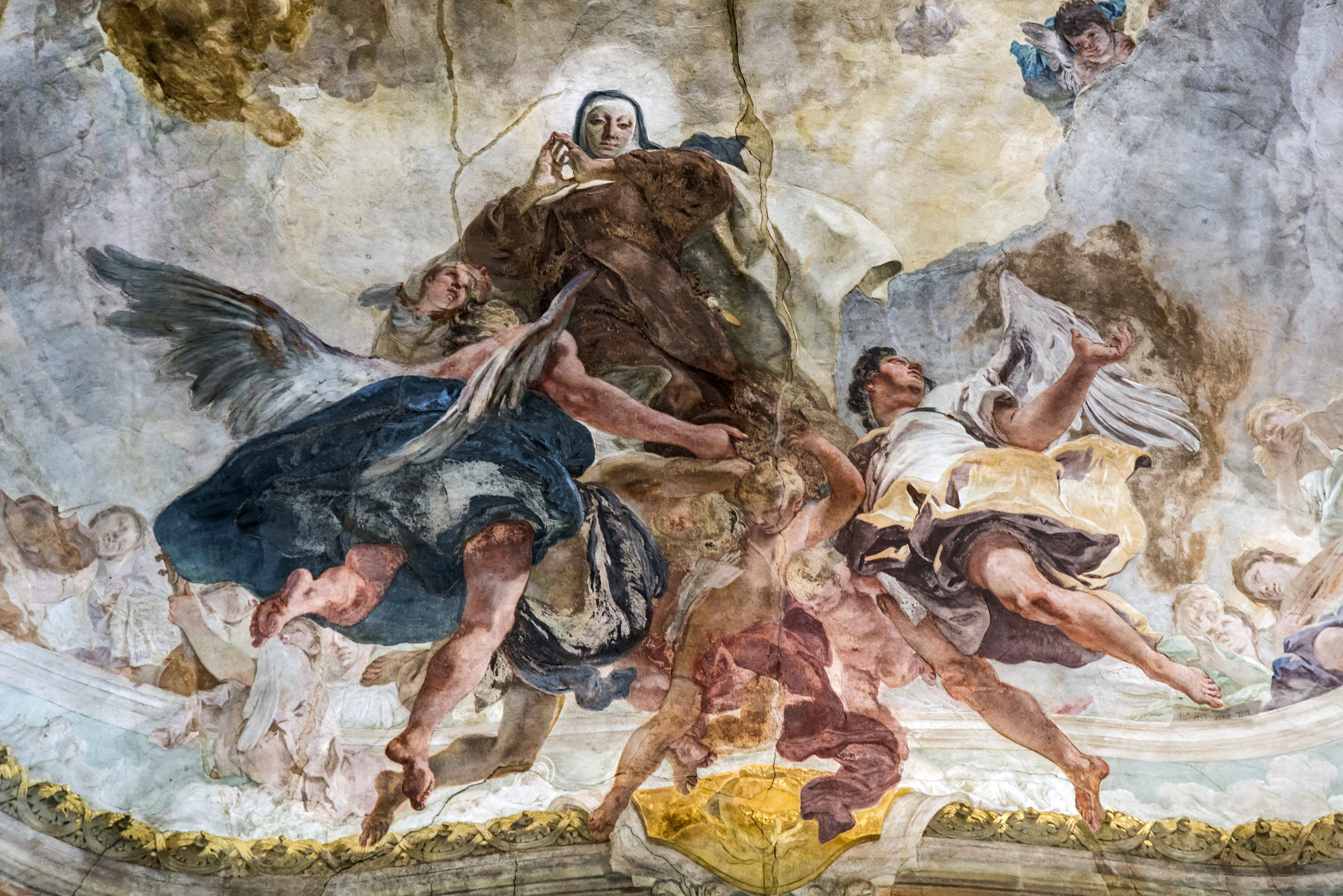
The Gloria of St. Teresa close-up

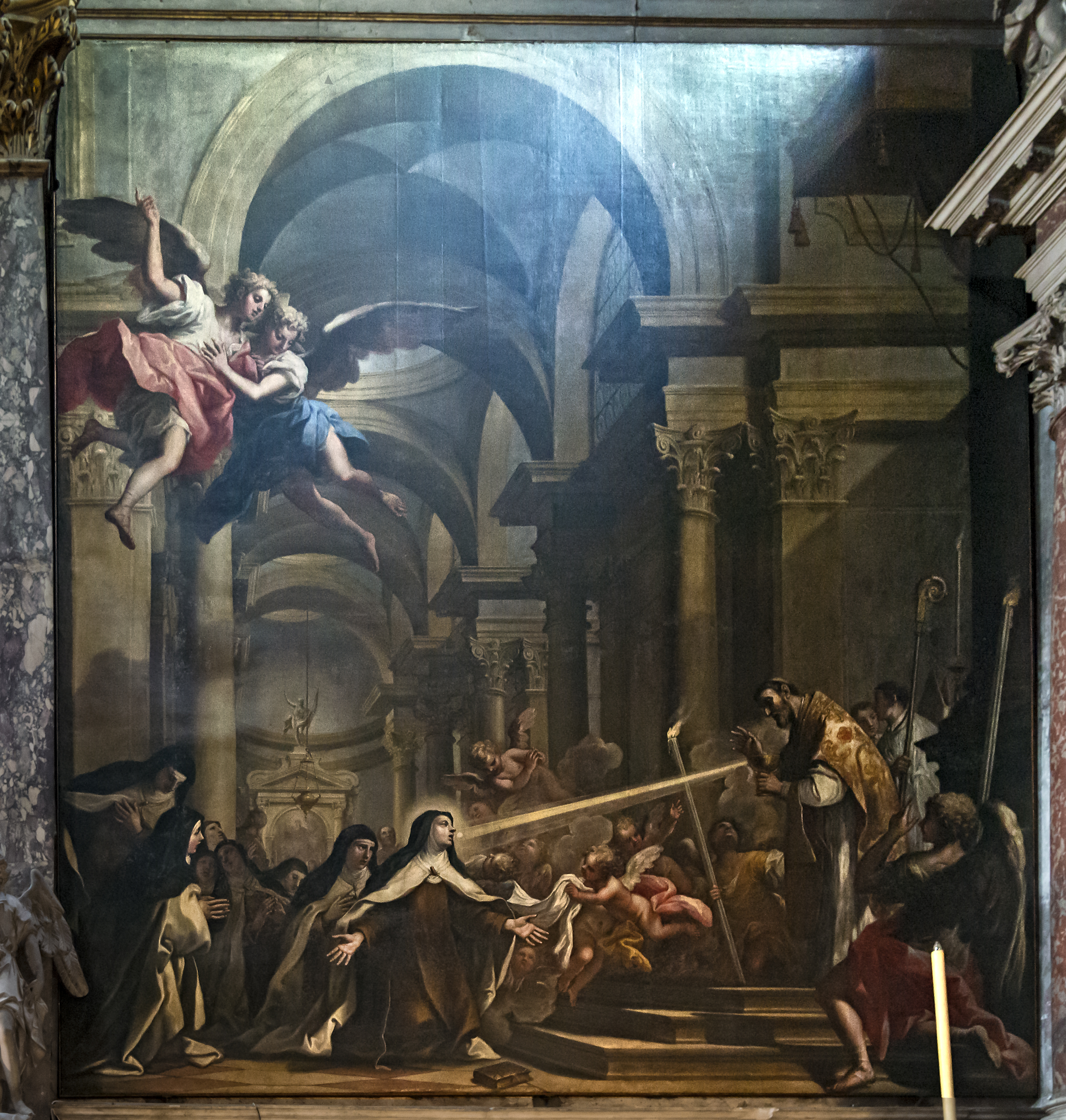
The miracle of the host by Niccolò Bambini

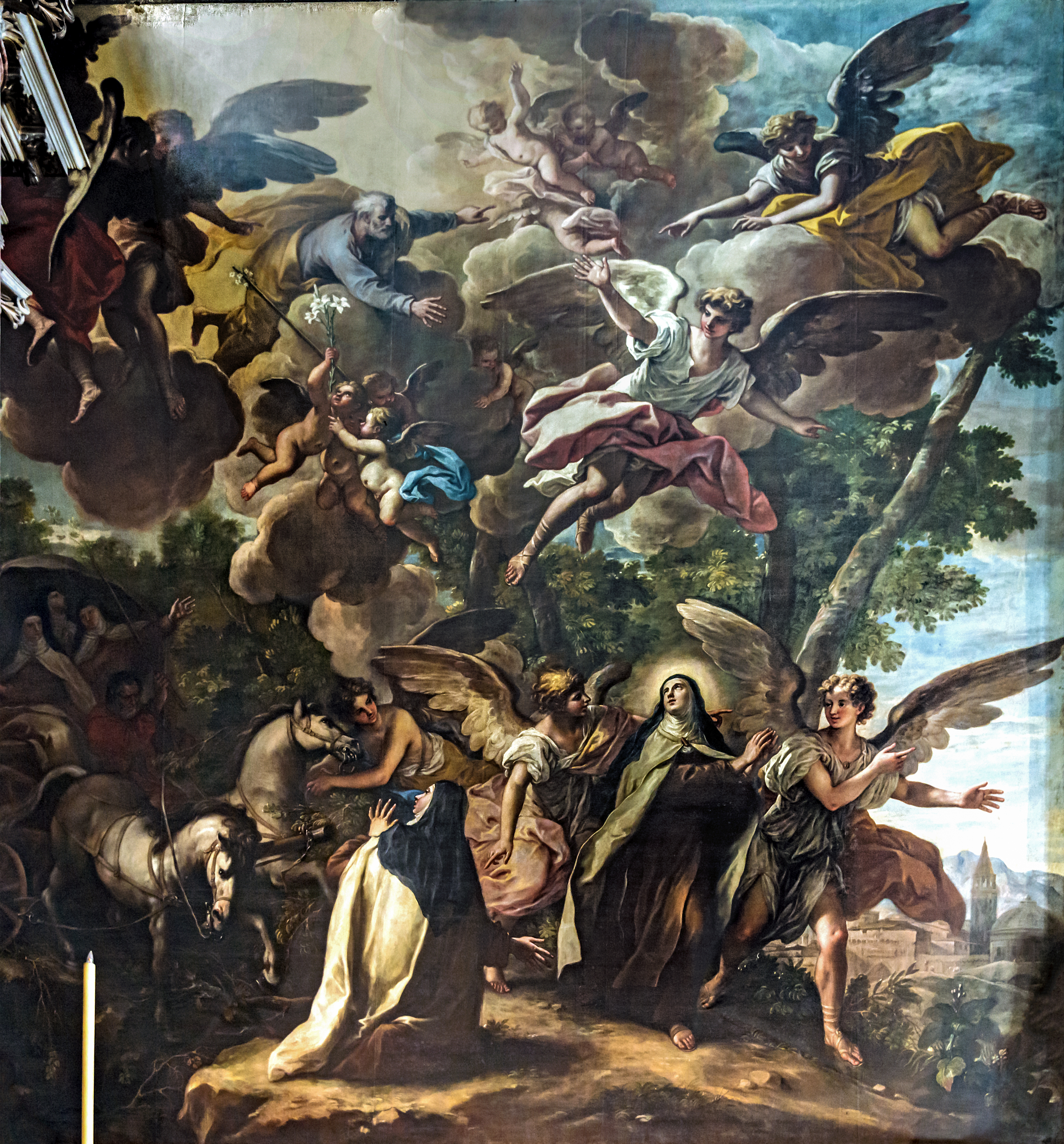
Saint Joseph appears to Saint Teresae byv Niccolò Bambini

==== Chapel Manin ====
Here is buried the last doge of Venice, Ludovico Manin, who died on 23 October 1802. The chapel was built by brother Giuseppe Pozzo. The altarpiece shows a sculpture of "The Virgin and Child and St. Joseph in the Clouds" by Giuseppe Torretto, the author of the two angels. On the sidewalls of the chapel: statues, Archangel Michael and Archangel Gabriel, from the same Giuseppe Torretto. The two blue glass candelabras are Murano glassworks.

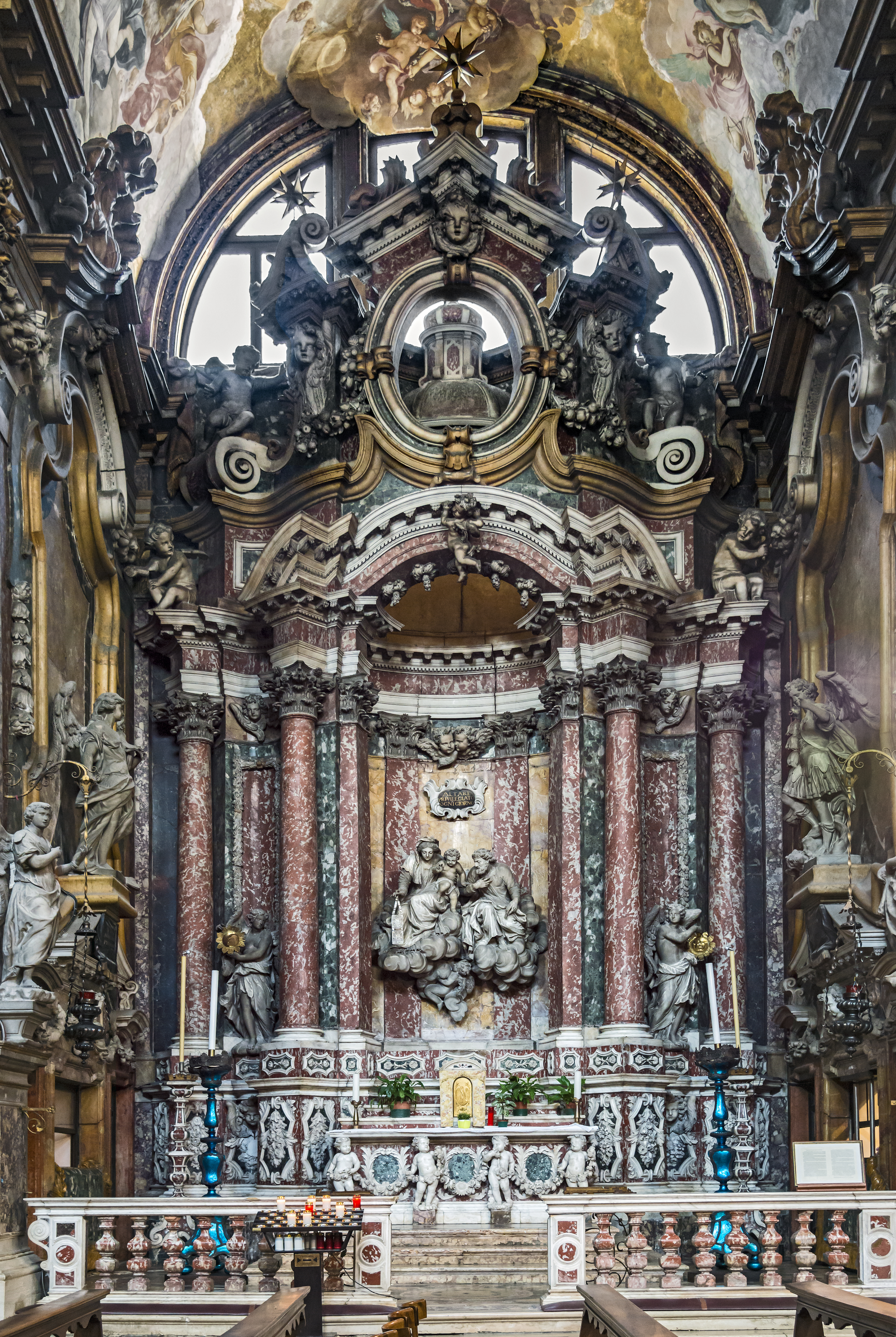

==== Chapel Venier ====
Built by Sebastiano Venier (not to be confused with the doge Sebastiano Venier), abbot and apostolic protonotary, which is buried in the chapel (died 1664), as well as his brother Angelo. The altarpiece shows a statue of St. Sebastian (1669) by Bernardo Falconi. The main altar is enriched with bronze bas-reliefs with episodes from the life of St. Sebastian of the same Bernardo Falconi.

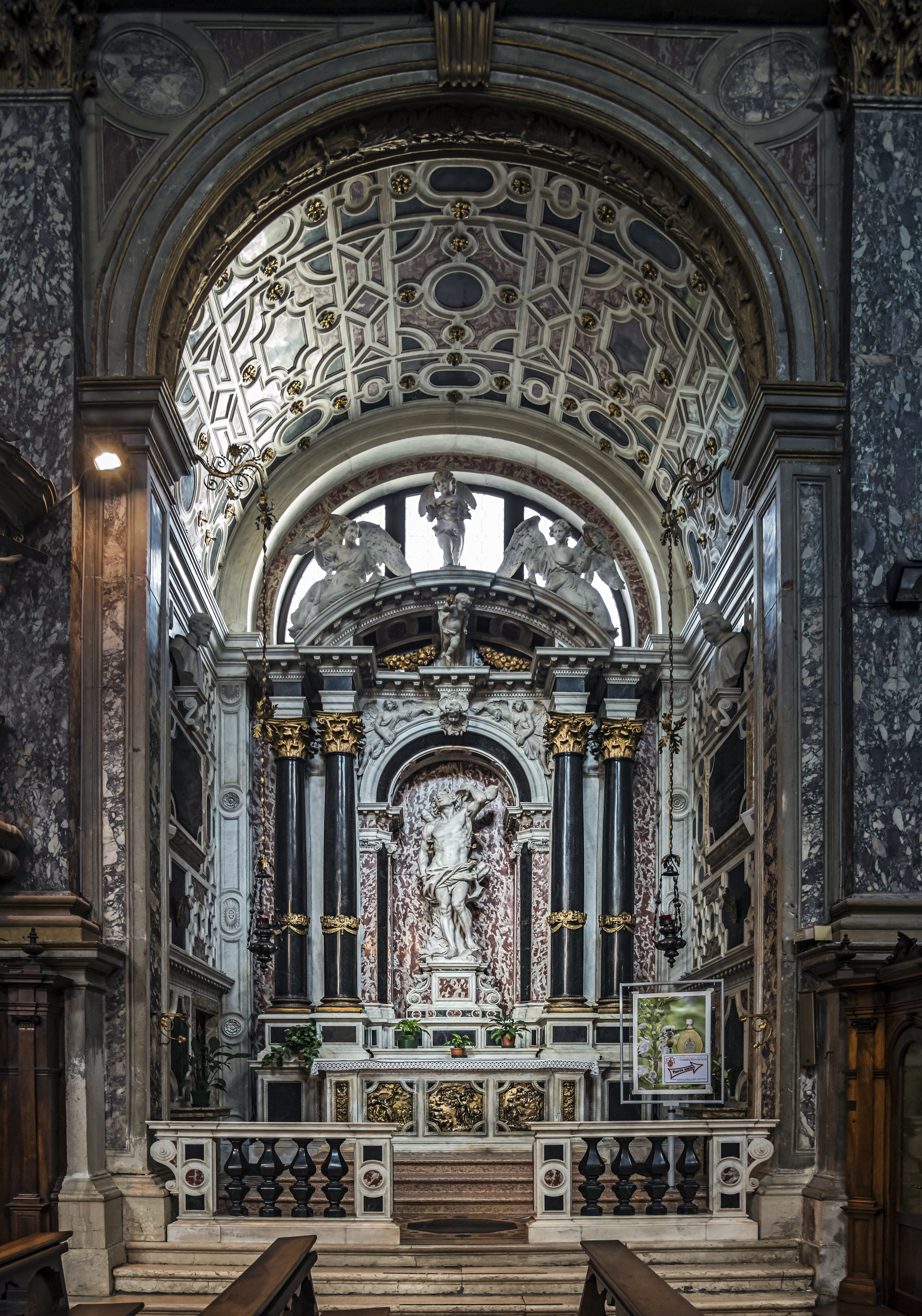
Chapel Venier

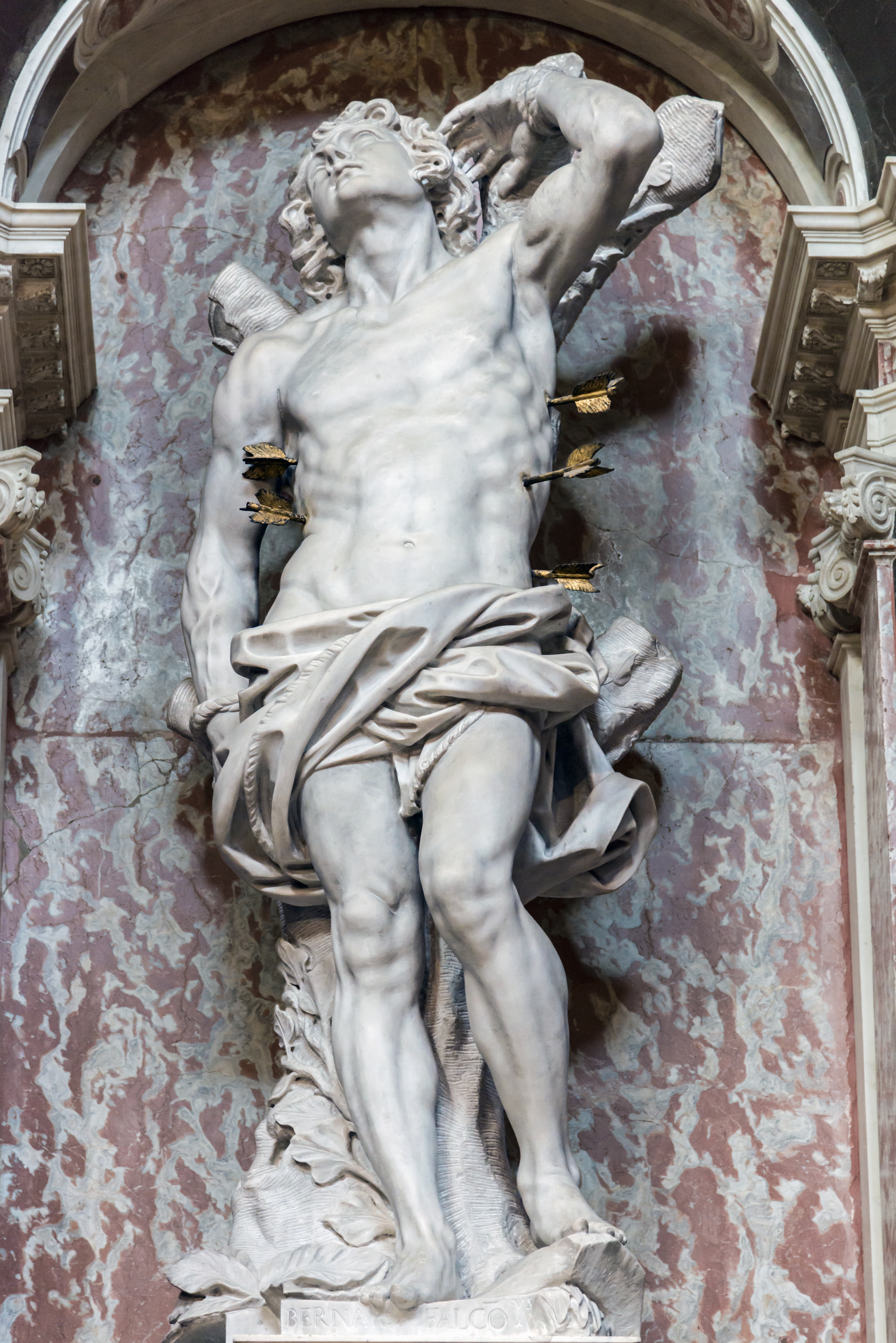
Saint Sebastian by Bernardo Falconi

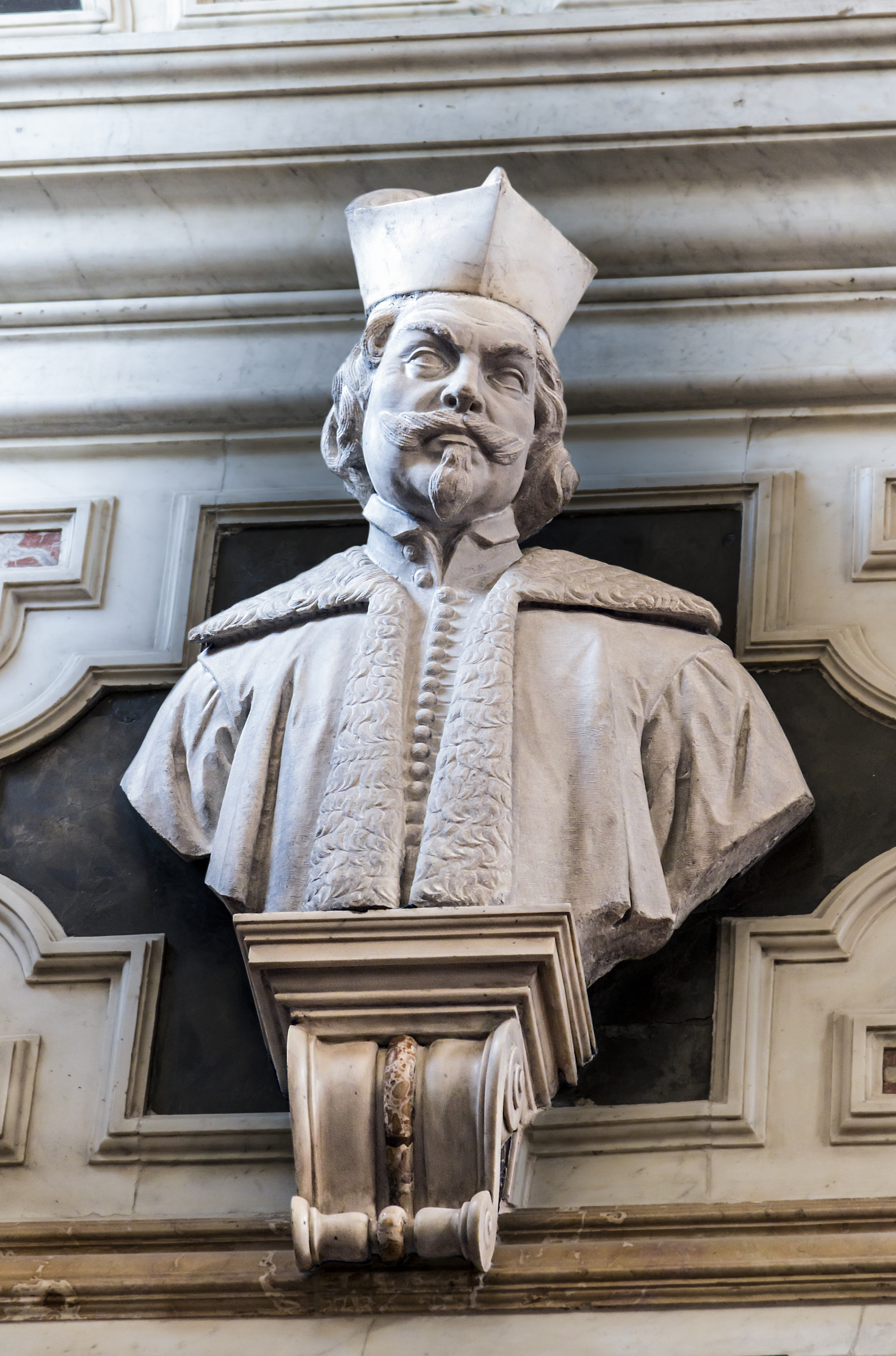
Sebastiano Venier by Bernardo Falconi

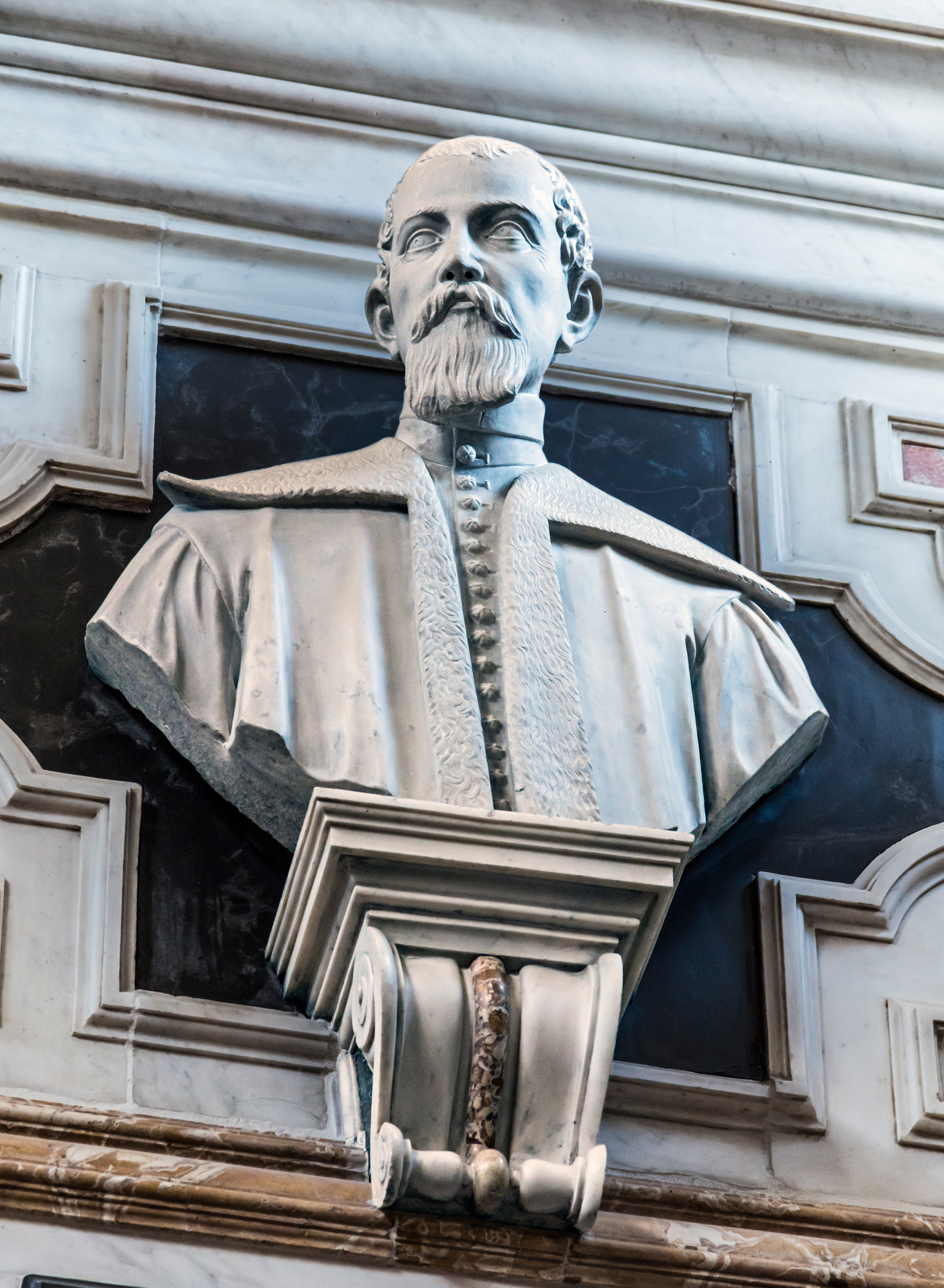
Angelo Venier by Bernardo Falconi

Other works of art include a St Theresa in Extasis (1697) by Heinrich Meyring and a Crucifixion by Giovanni Maria Morlaiter. Canvases by Tiepolo such as Apotheosis of St. Teresa and Christ at Gesthemane (1732) are displayed prominently in the church.

The ashes of Ludovico Manin, the last Doge of Venice, are entombed here.
