= Antonio Vassilacchi =

Greek painter (1556–1629)

- Αντώνιος Βασιλάκης
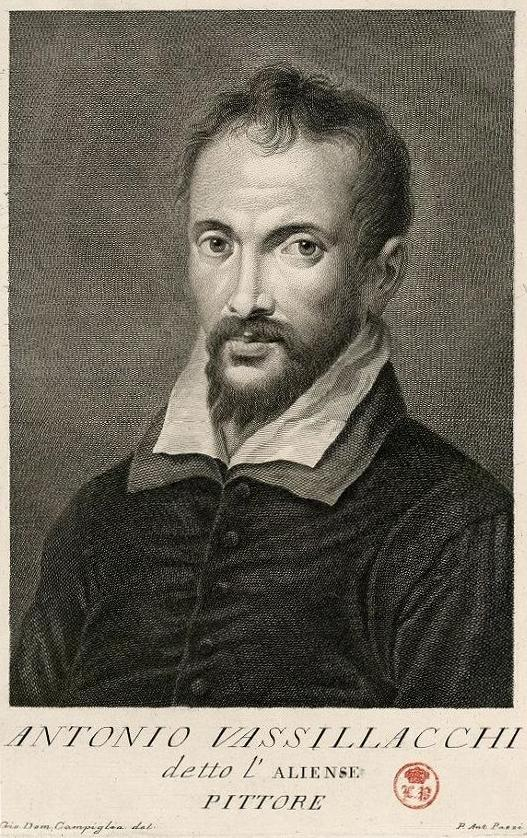
- Born: Antonios Vasilakis; 1556; Milos, Duchy of the Archipelago, Venetian Empire (in present-day Greece)
- Died: 1629 (aged 72–73); San Vitale, Venetian Empire
- Known for: Painting
- Movement: High Renaissance

Antonio Vassilacchi (Italian pronunciation: [anˈtɔːnjo vassiˈlakki]; Greek: Αντώνιος Βασιλάκης, romanized: Antonios Vasilakis; 1556–1629), also called L'Aliense, was a Greek painter, who was active mostly in Venice and the Veneto.

== Biography ==
Antonio Vassilacchi was born of Greek descent, on the island of Milos, Greece in 1556. He left very young to settle in Venice. In 1572, Vassilacchi became a pupil of Paolo Veronese and began working on the frescoes in the episcopal palace at Treviso, in the church of Sant'Agata in Padua (Padova), and various churches in Venice. His opportunity came with the great conflagration that nearly devoured the Doge's Palace in Venice in December 1577. Aliense, a compatriot and just a little younger than El Greco, was one of the painters commissioned to decorate the restored Palace.

Vassilacchi became a member of 'The Brotherhood of Saint Nicolas of the Greek Nation' (Scuola dei Greci), one of the liveliest 'foreign' communities in Venice, in 1600. In its book of members, the secretary inscribed, between a Cephallonian and a Cypriot, "Ant. Vassilachi: 1600:". He was also a member of the Brotherhood of Venetian Painters from 1584 and had acquired a sobriquet, 'Aliense'. The name derives from the Latin alienus, meaning stranger, alien, foreign, and was presumably given to Vassilacchi because of his completely alien, that is non-Italian (and not simply non-Venetian), origin.

Vassilacchi married three times. The name of his first wife, who bore him his son, Stefano, is not known. Stefano followed in his father's footsteps as a painter and is said to have helped him on the Coronation of Baldwin of Flanders.

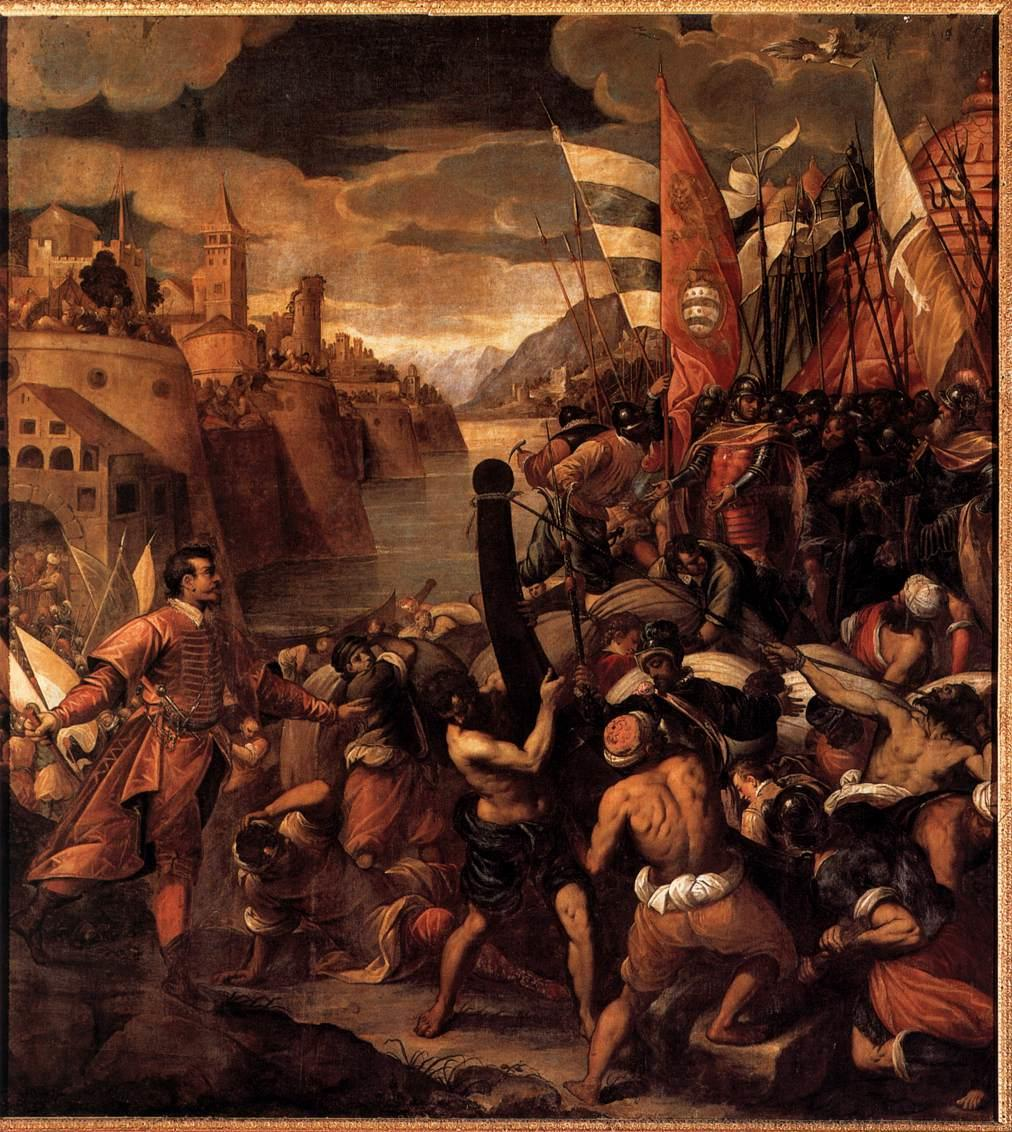
Conquest of Tyre Oil on canvas, Palazzo Ducale, Venice (1590).

He died young, however, before having established a career. Vassilacchi also had two daughters who entered the Nunnery of Santa Chiara (for which Vassilacchi had painted an Annunciation), though it is not known whether they were from his first or second marriage. His second wife, Giacomina, made her will on November 2, 1609, and died six days later. Vassilacchi's last marriage was his most unfortunate. Carlo Ridolfi, his biographer and student, describes a painting by the artist in which he portrays himself carrying his wife, her nurse, her uncle and her son by her previous marriage, on his back. Vassilacchi used to show this picture to his friends and say "This is the burden I'll bear till I die".

Aliense died on Easter's eve, 1629, in his seventy-third year. He was buried with honours in the church of San Vitale two days later. San Vitale is the church on the same square as Vassilacchi's house and he had painted there, a few years earlier (and both aptly named), a Resurrection and an Ascension.

His entry in the official Venetian register reads: 1629, 15 April. Sire Antonio Aliense, painter, aged about 73 years, sick of fever and catarrh these twelve days past. Among his pupils was Tomasso Dollobella.

== Works ==
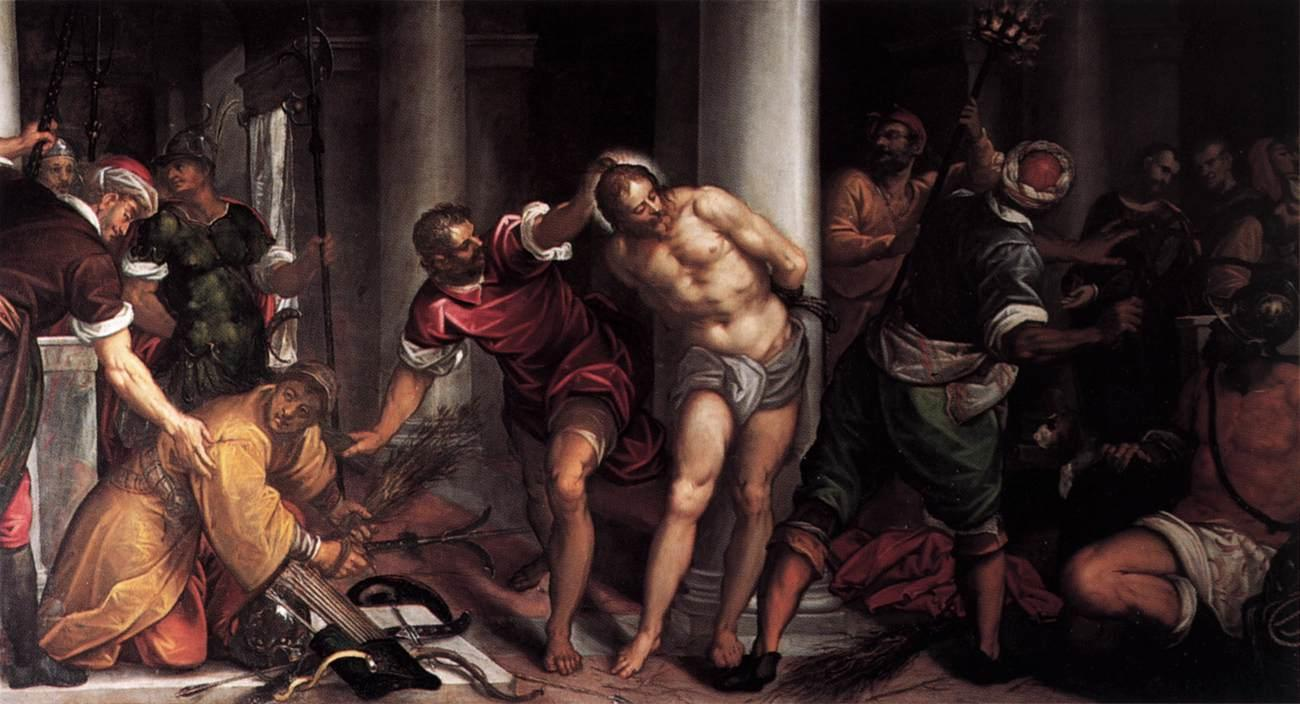
Flagellation. Vassilacchi's painting is on the wall of the Chapel of Our Lady of Peace. Formerly it was in the Scuola di Santa Croce at Belluno.

His works in the Doges' Palace likely outnumber those by any other single artist, since he painted in all the major halls of the Palace, such as the Hall of the Grand Council (Sala del Maggior Consiglio), the Voting Hall (Sala dello Scrutinio), the Hall of the Senate (Sala del Senato), the Hall of the Council of Ten (Sala del Consiglio dei Dieci), the Hall of the Compass (Sala della Bussola).

In 1586, Vassilacchi was asked to paint one of his largest pictures, the 'Resurrection', in the chancel of San Marziale. He gave the preliminary sketch, in chiaroscuro, to Domenico Cresti, the painter of the Crucifixion in the same church. The paintings, restored in 1958, still hang in the same place, across from each other above the marble high altar of the church.

In 1591, Vassilacchi was engaged by the Brotherhood of Merchants (Scuola dei Mercanti), and some time later he was working in the church of San Giovanni Elemosinario, just a few metres from the commercial centre of Venice, the Rialto. He painted the Plague of Serpents (1588) in the Church of the Angelo San Raffaele. Behind the facade of the church of San Zaccaria, at least four large works by Aliense are preserved.

In 1559, the Benedictine monks of San Giorgio Maggiore decided to renovate their church. They commissioned Palladio to execute the work but at the time of his death, twenty one years later, it was still unfinished. The abbot then summoned Vassilacchi to select the best, in his opinion, preliminary design for the central altar of the church.

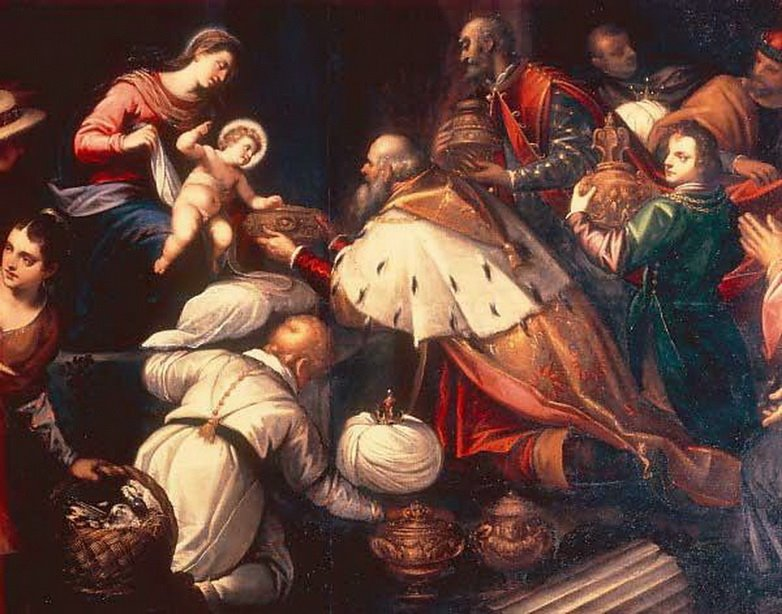
Adoration of the Magi, c. 1600.

Naturally modest and polite, Aliense had a good word to say about all the sketches, which complicated rather than simplified matters. In the end, the up to then judge was asked to design something himself. His sketch was immediately accepted and from it was created the large bronze group of the Four Evangelists Supporting the World and God.

In 1594, Aliense, recommended by the Benedictines of San Giorgio Maggiore, undertook to paint the circle of pictures that consist the Life of Christ for the church of San Pietro in Perugia, which belonged to the same Order. The ten paintings still survive in their original setting, together with his monumental "Apotheosis of the Benedictine Order" which, at 88 square metres (947 square feet), is the second biggest painting in Italy.

In 1602, Antonio Vassilacchi began painting in the cathedral church at Salò, while his surviving work—mainly decorative—in the Villa Barbarigo, of the senator Giovanni Barbarigo at Noventa Vicentina, near Montagnana, is impressive.

His last works are those painted in Santa Maria in Vanzo, Padua.

== Gallery ==
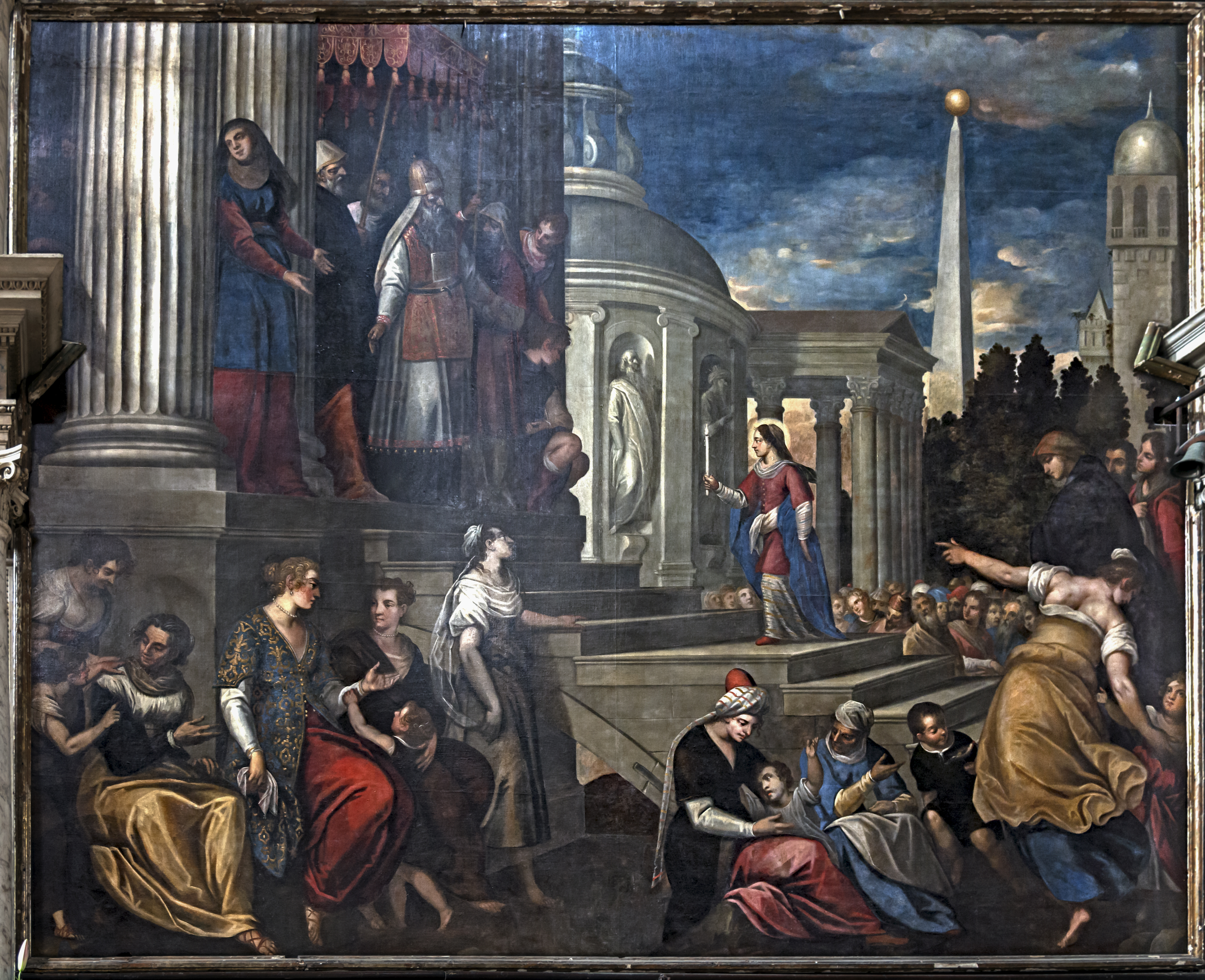
The Virgin Arriving at the Church of San Zaccaria 1600

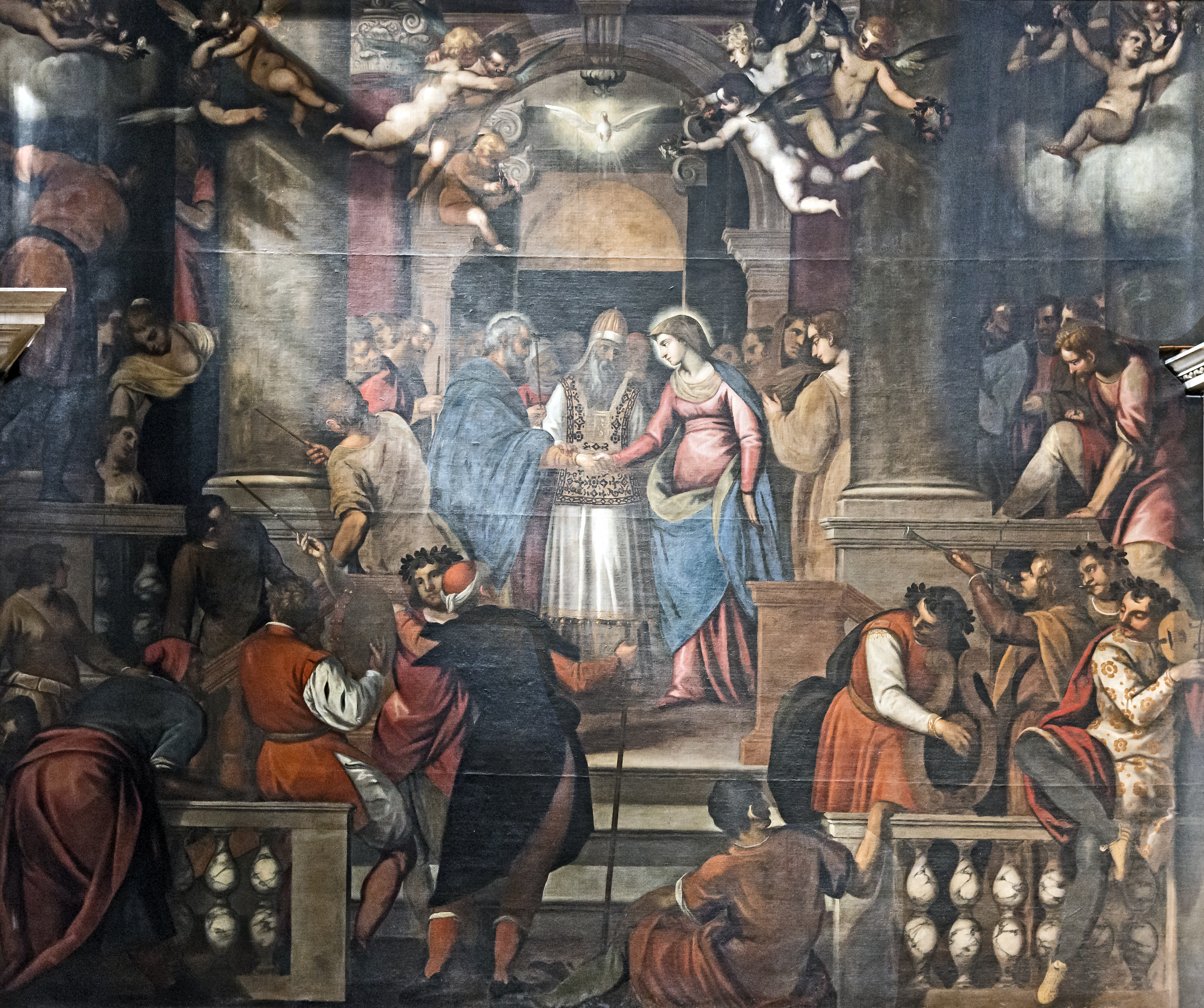
Church of San Zaccaria, Venice: Marriage of the Virgin, 1600

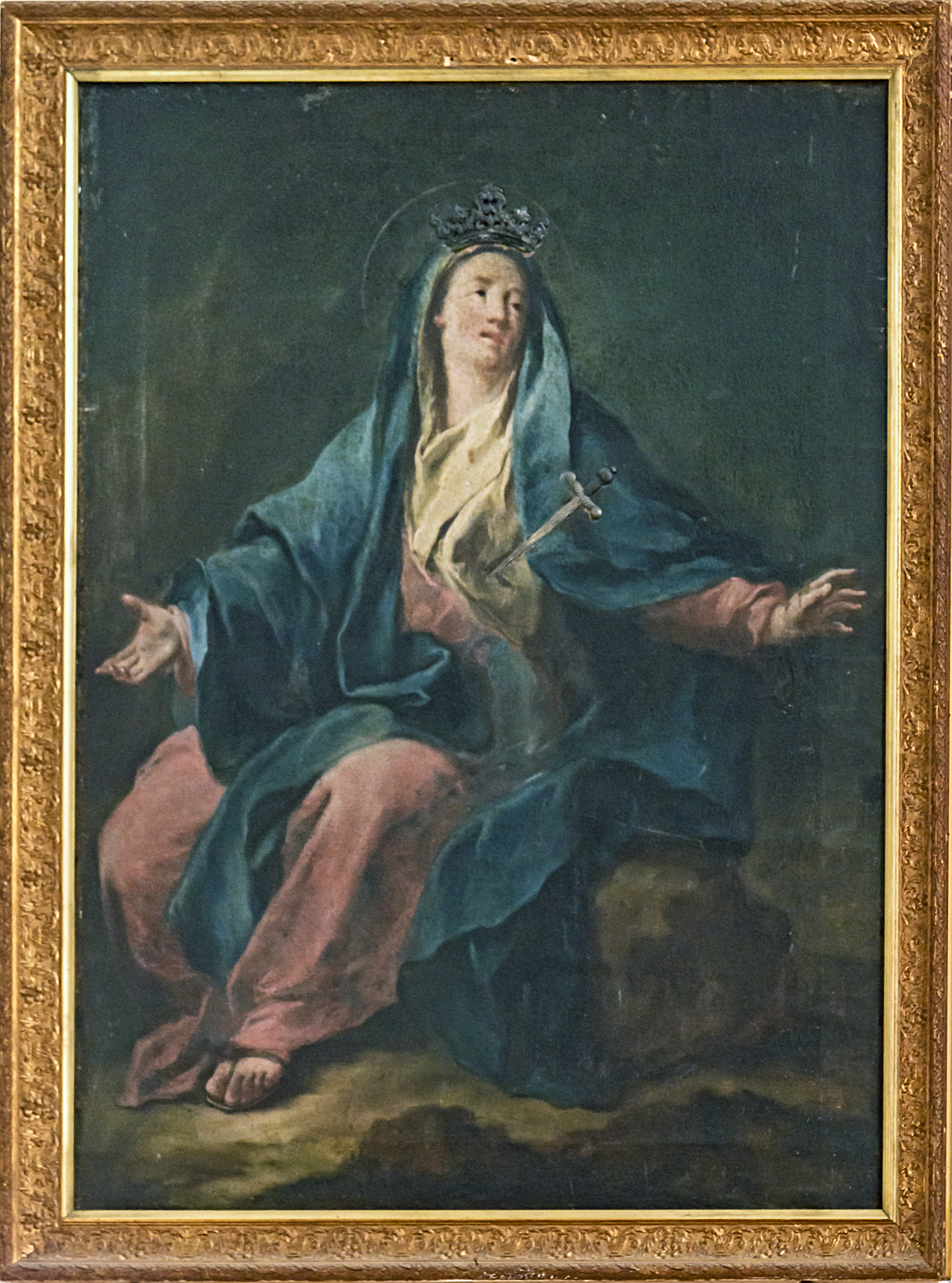
Woman Praying for Forgiveness

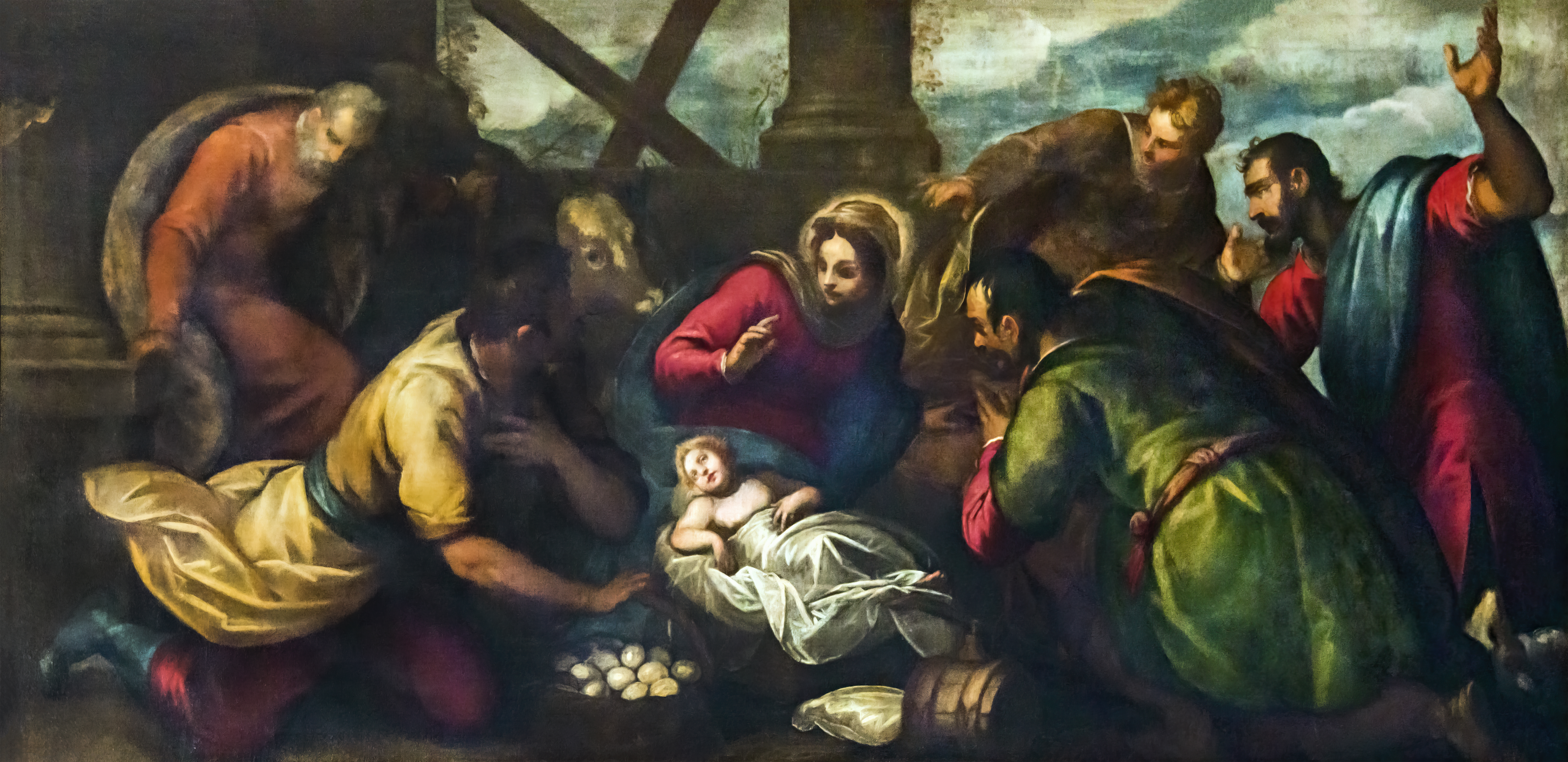
Virgin and Child with the shepherds, 17 century.

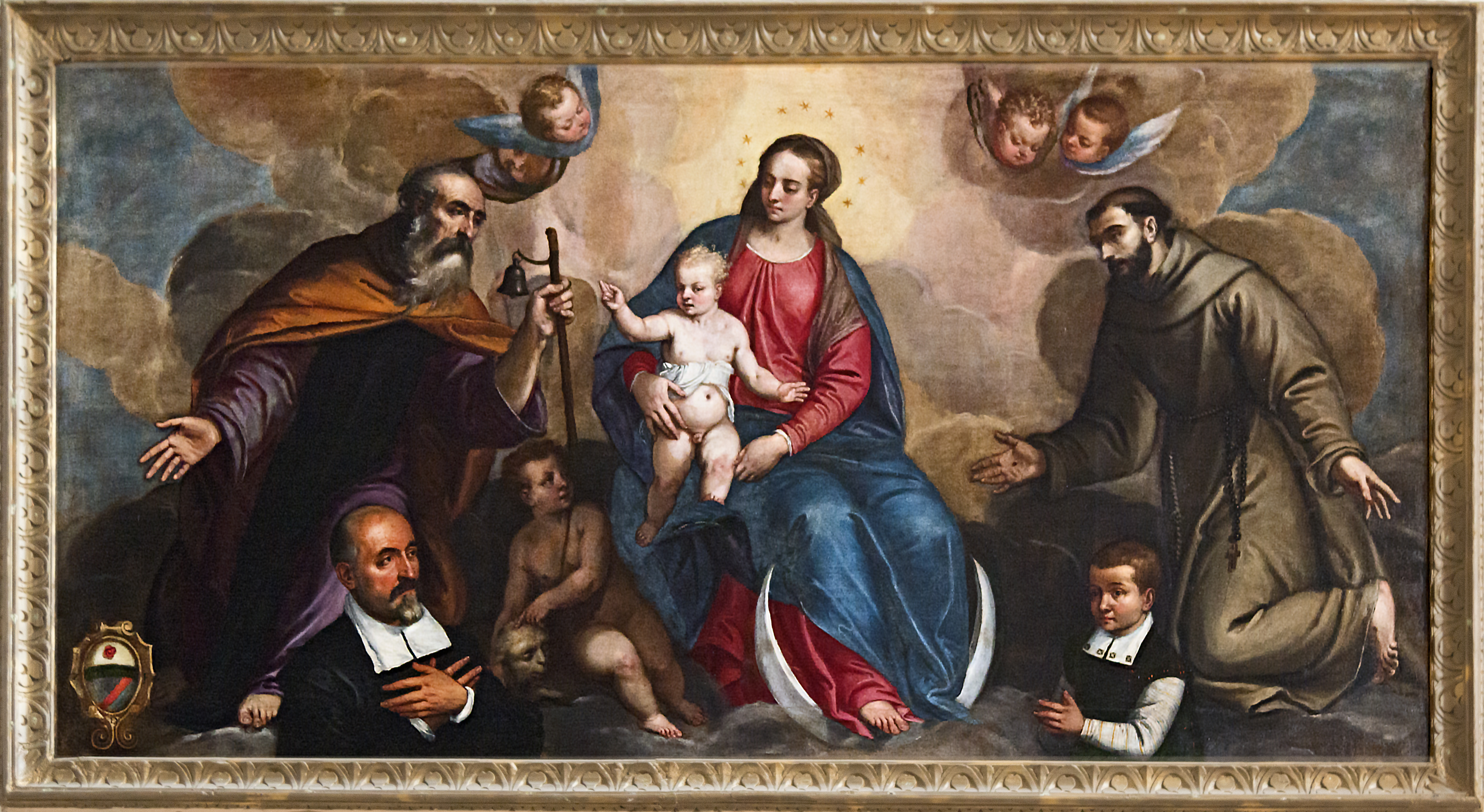
Virgin and Child, 17 century

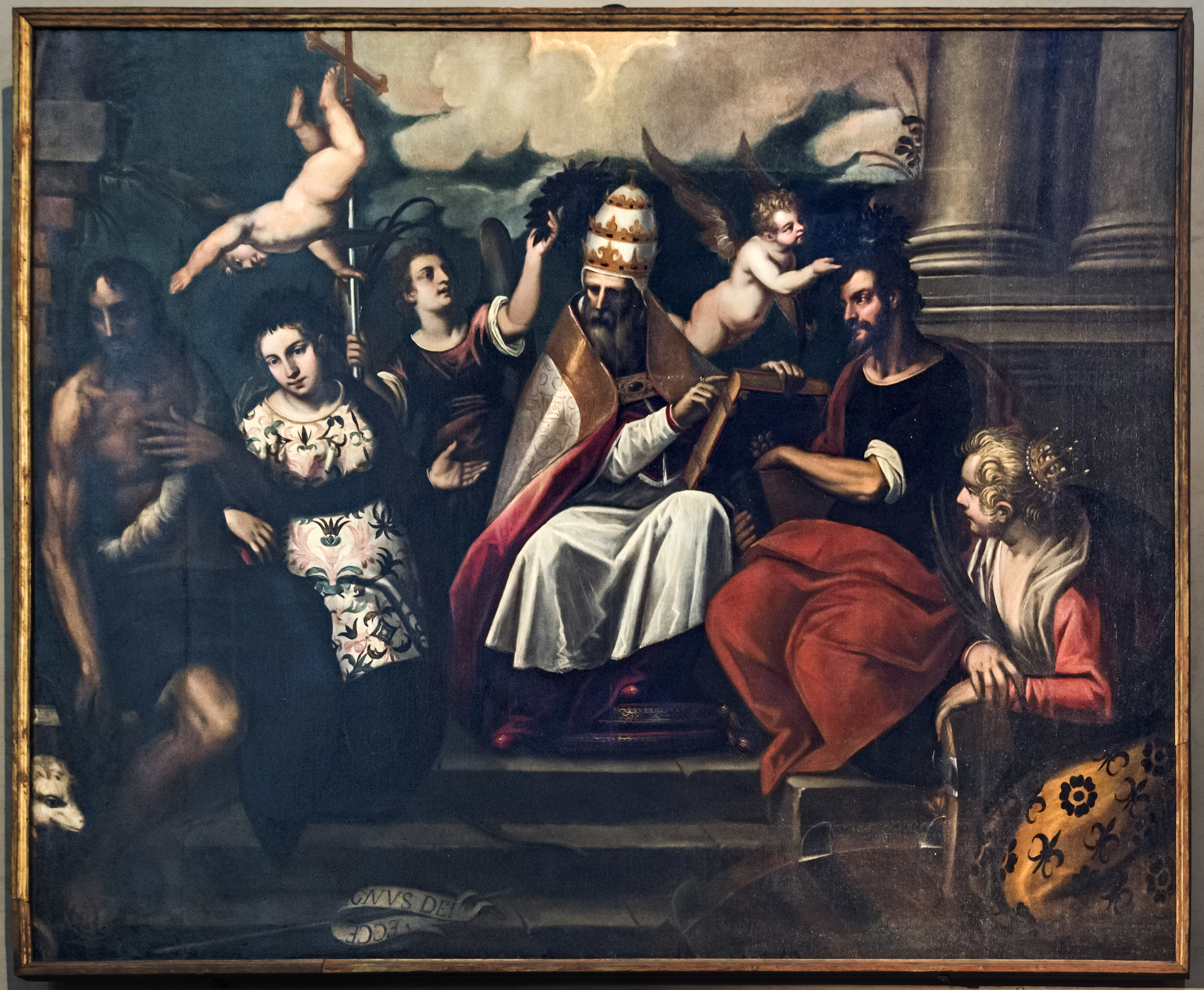
Saint Gregory with Saints 1600

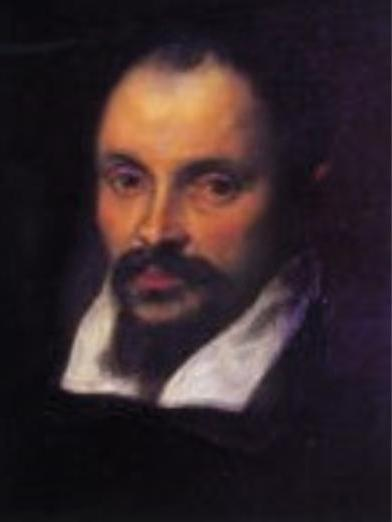
Self-portrait

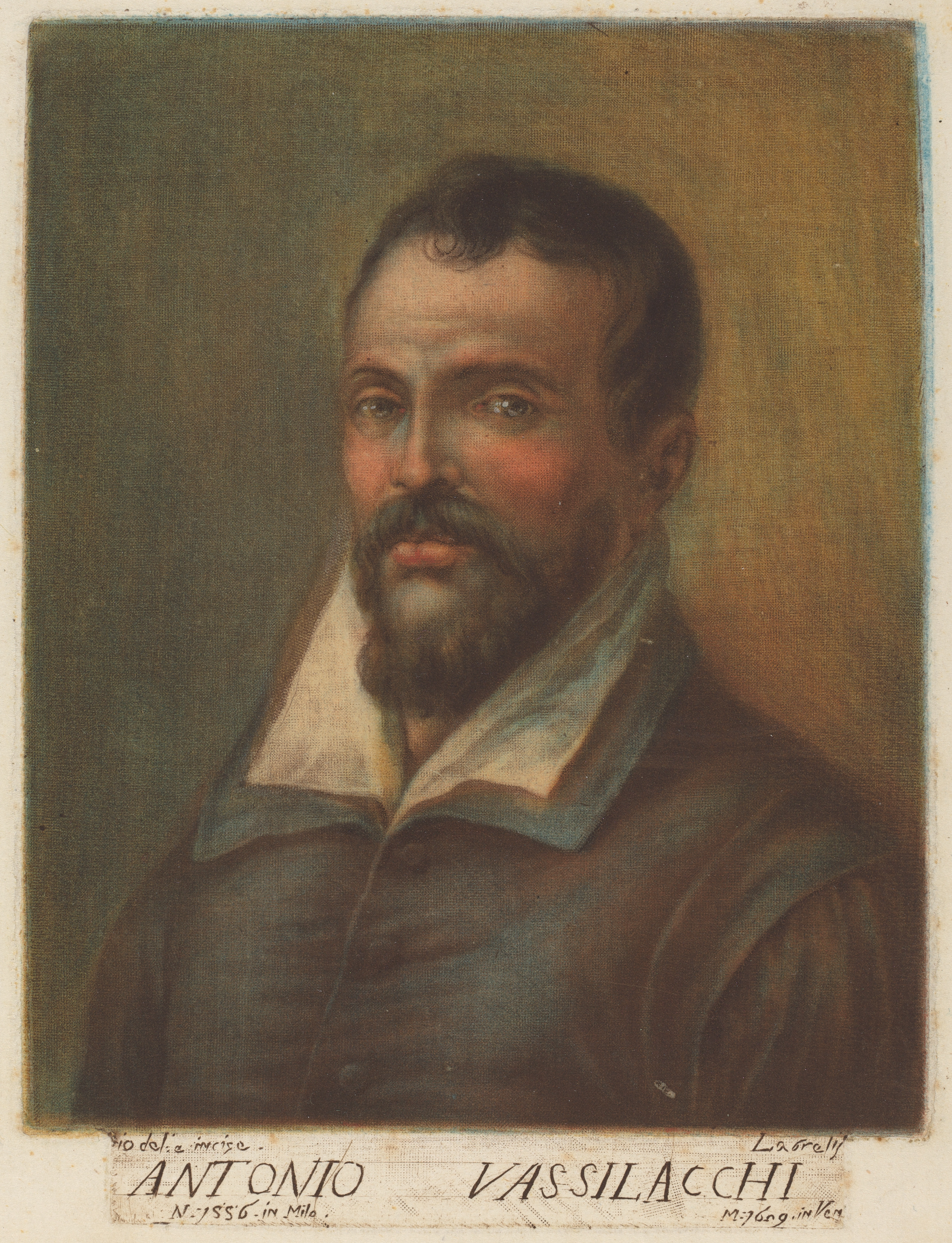
Carlo Lasinio, after Antonio Vassilacchi

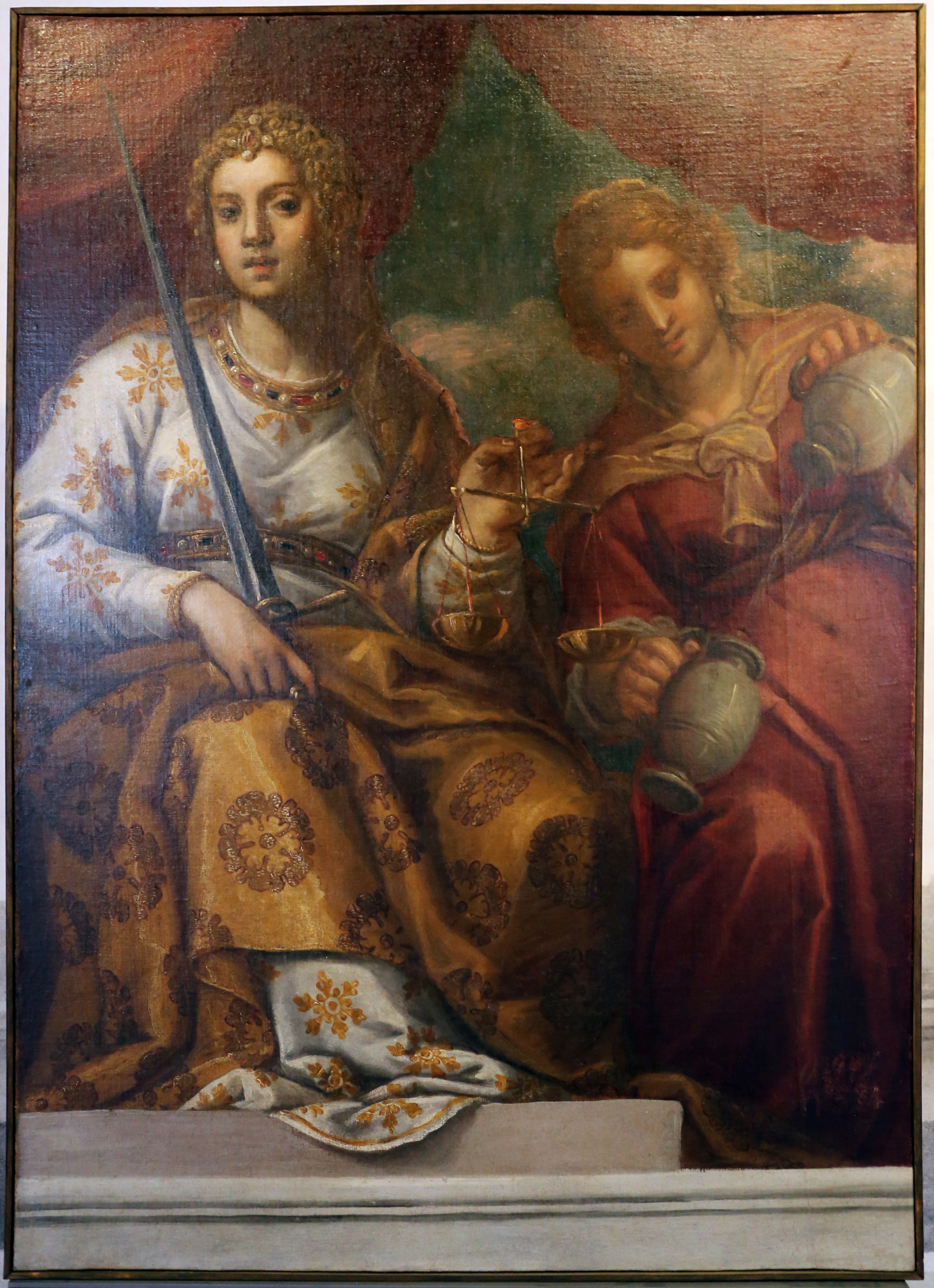
Peace and Justice
