= San Marziale =

Italian church in Venice

Church of San Marziale
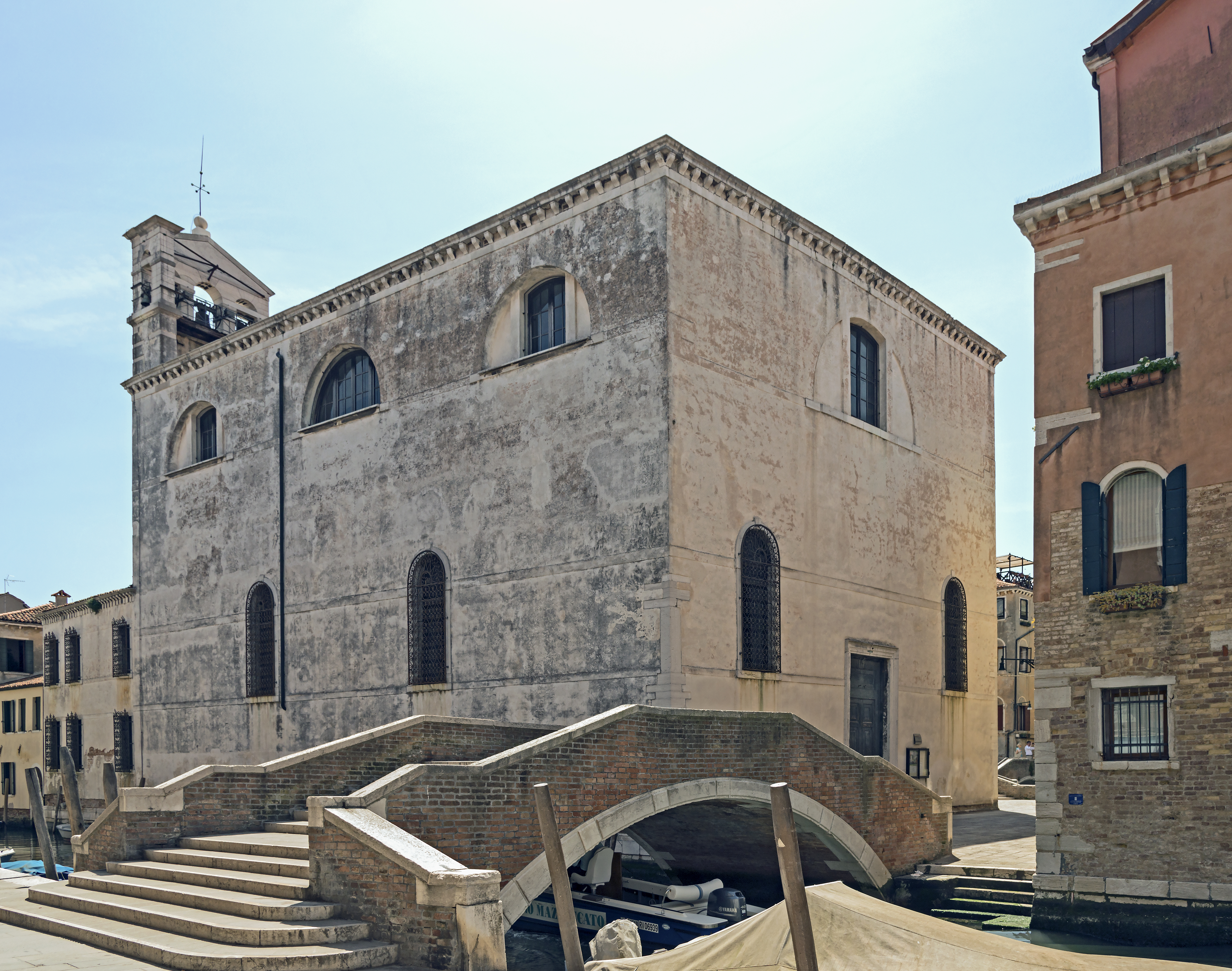
- Facade & Ponte San Marziale

- Location within Venice Location within Italy

Religion
- Affiliation: Roman Catholic
- Province: Venice
- Year consecrated: 1721

Location
- Location: Venice, Italy
- Coordinates: 45.4438°N 12.3329°E

Architecture
- Type: Church
- Groundbreaking: 1133
- Completed: 1714

San Marziale is a church building in the sestiere or neighborhood of Cannaregio in Venice.

The church dates to 1133. The present church was rebuilt in 1693–1714 at the commission of Pietro Barbarigo, and reconsecrated in 1721. It contains works by Antonio Vassilacchi (L'Aliense) (Resurrection), Domenico Cresti (il Passignano), Tintoretto (one of the altar pieces Saint Martial in Glory with Saints Peter and Paul), and Giulia Lama (four paintings including two of the Evangelists St Matthew and St Mark). The Scuola del Santissimo Sacramento commissioned the altar (1691-1704) in the chancel attributed to Tommaso Rues. He also sculpted the elaborate marble main altar, depicting Christ Ruler of World with Saints and Angels is dedicated to the Blessed Virgin of the Graces. The icon is a copy of the original image supposedly sculpted in Rimini in 1286 by a shepherd named Rustico and miraculously brought to Venice.

The ceiling frescoes are by Sebastiano Ricci and depict The arrival of the icon of the Madonna in Venice, Apotheosis of Saint Marziale, Rustico observing angels sculpt the statue of the Madonna, and finally God the Father in Glory. It once contained a Titian painting of Tobias and the Angel, which is now in Madonna dell'Orto

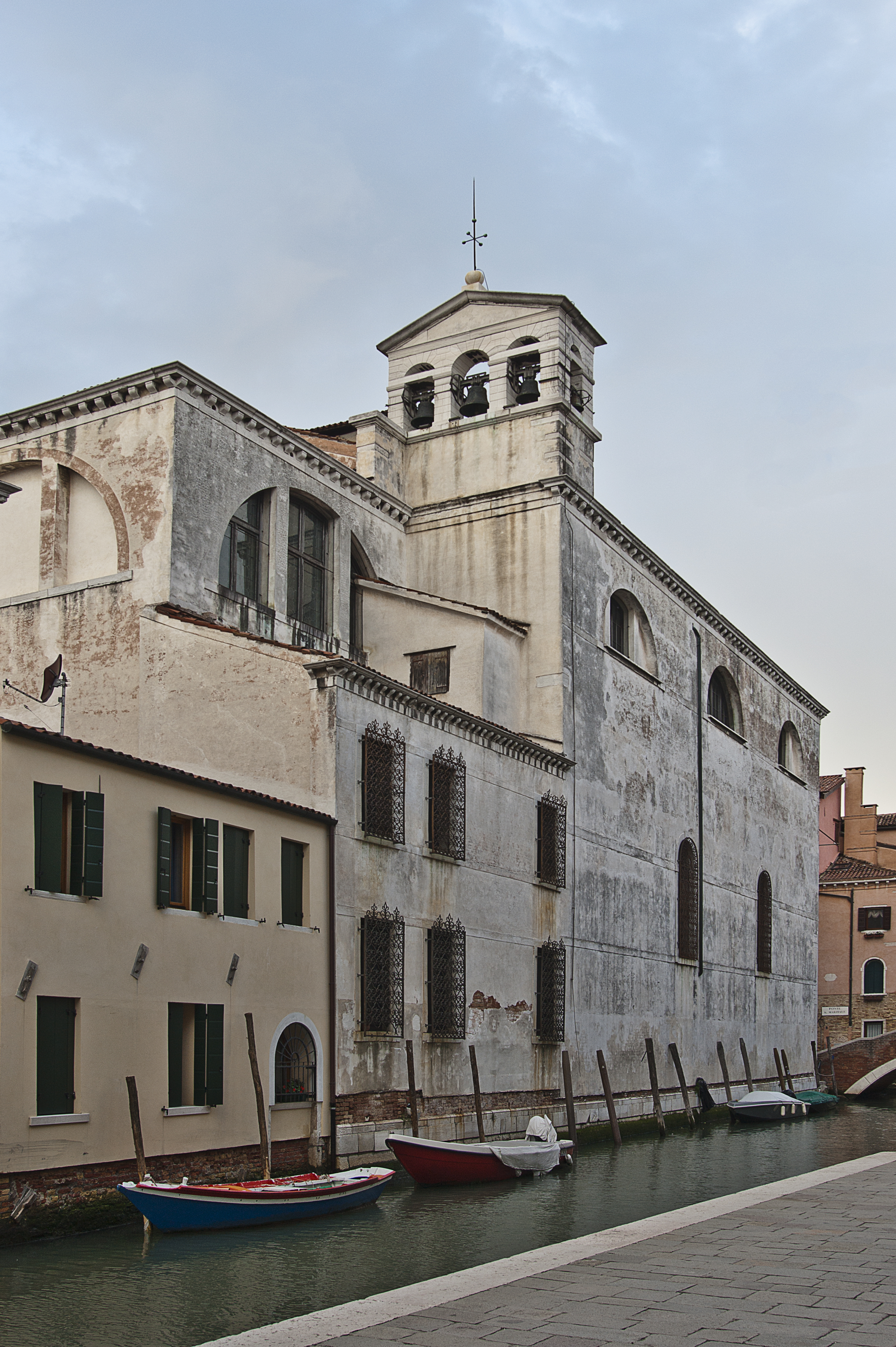
Church of San Marziale in Venice, abside and bell gable.

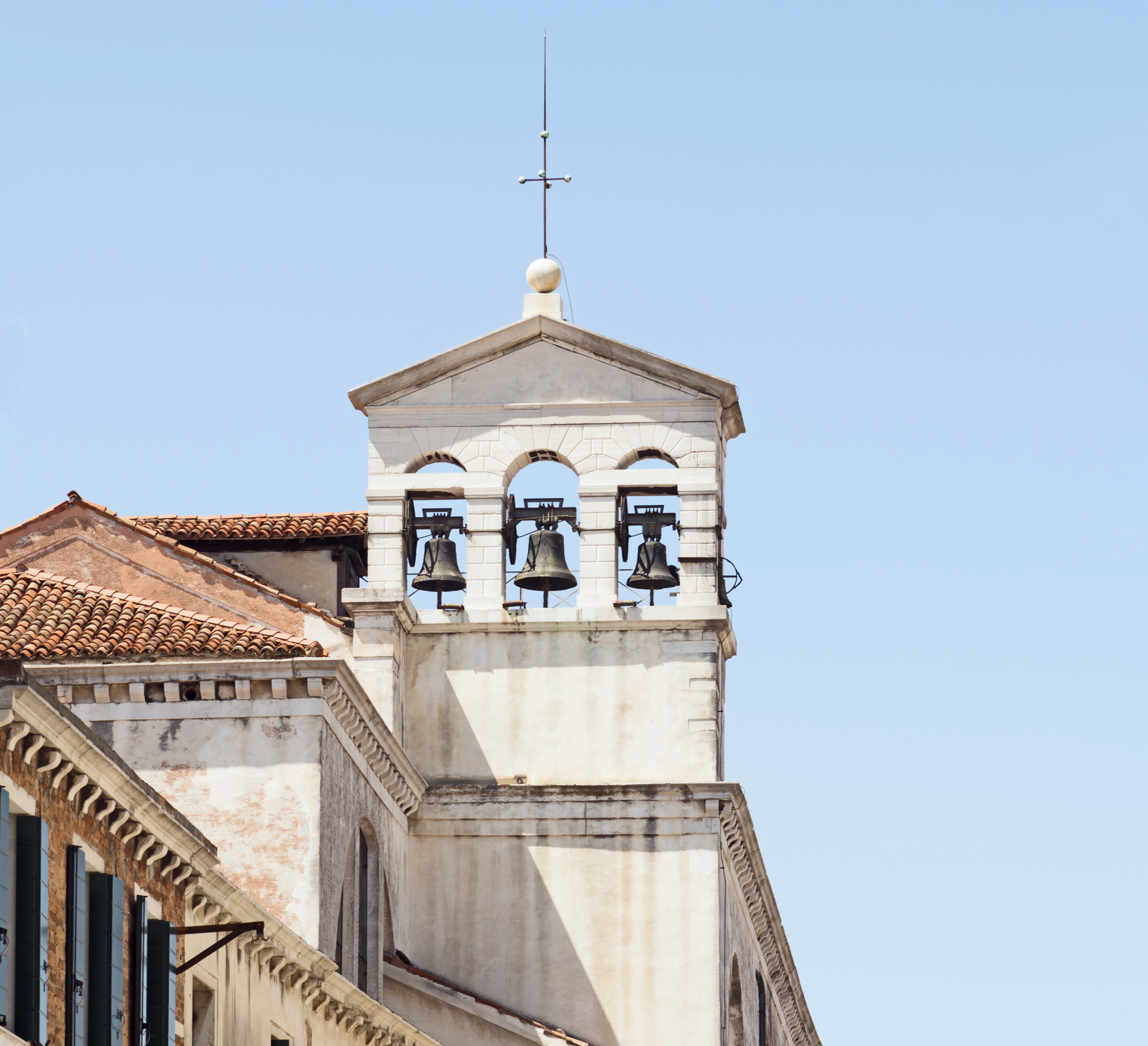
Bell Gable

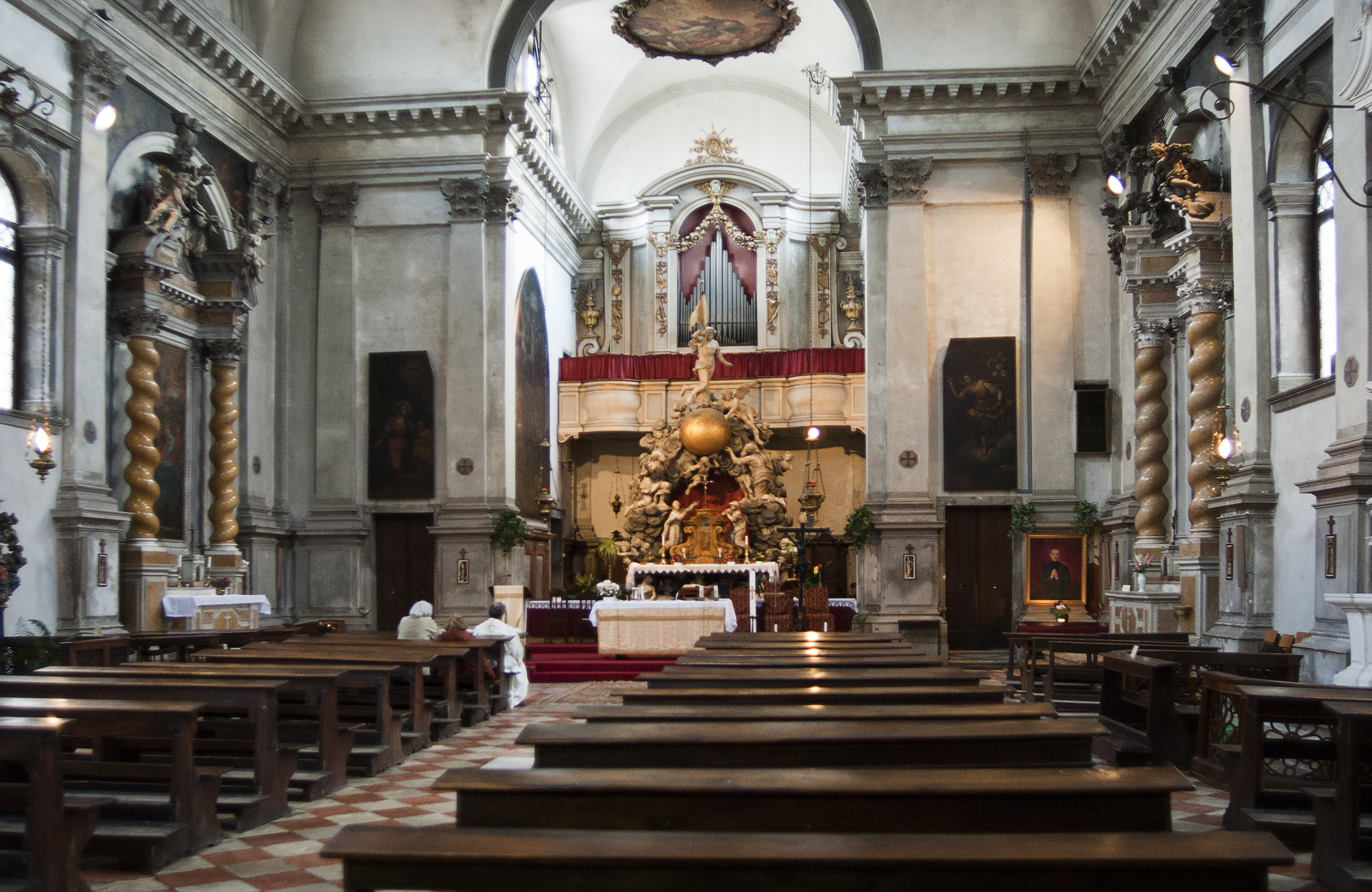
Interior
