= Crucifixion (Titian) =

1558 painting by Titian

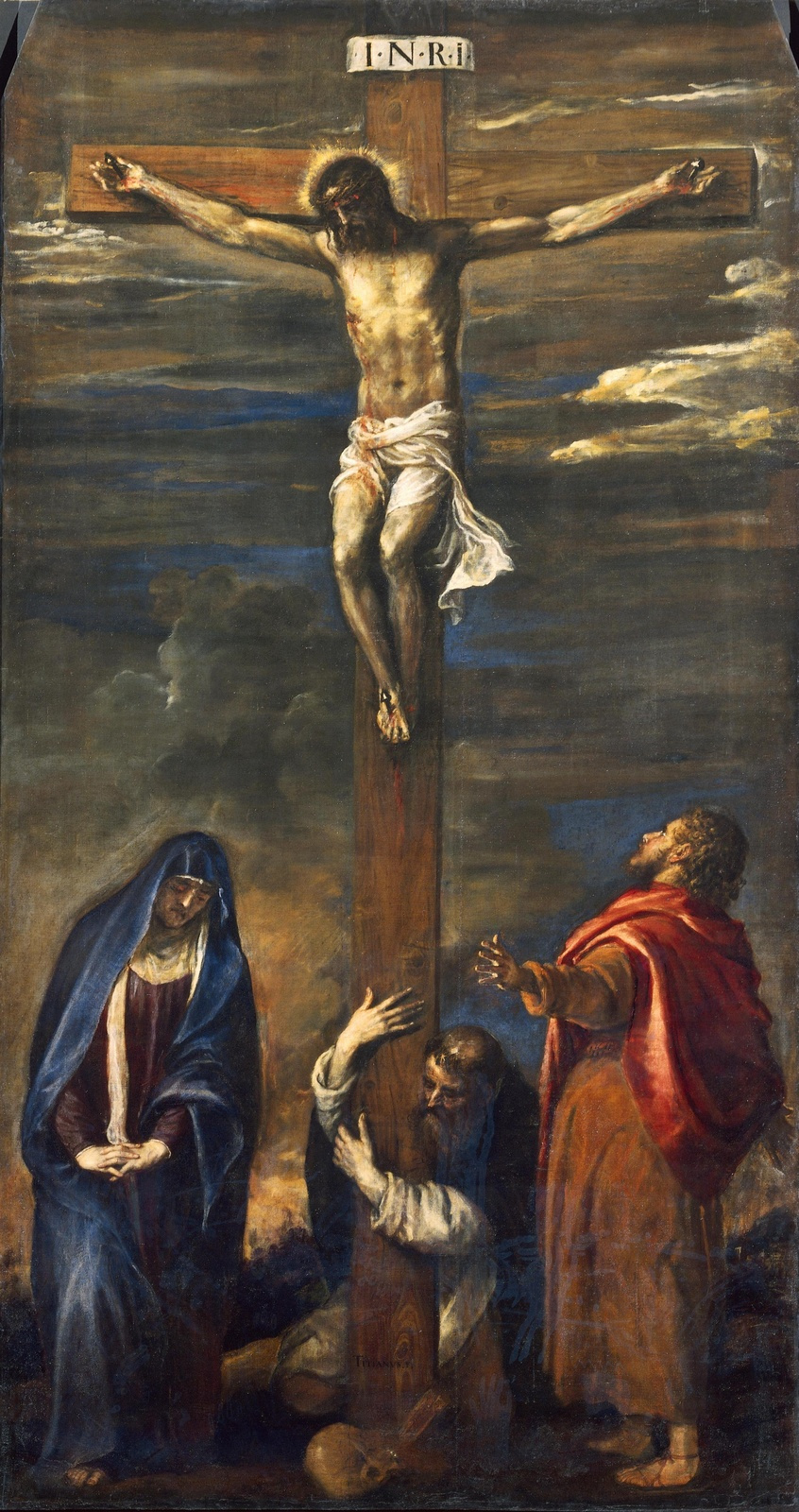
- Artist: Titian
- Year: 1558
- Medium: Oil on canvas
- Dimensions: 371 cm × 197 cm (146 in × 78 in)
- Location: Pinacoteca civica Francesco Podesti (on loan); Ancona

The Crucifixion is a life sized painting by the Venetian artist Titian, completed in 1558 and presently hanging in the sanctuary of the church of San Domenico, Ancona. Jesus Christ is shown crucified, with Saint Mary and Saint John standing either side of the cross in the Stabat Mater tradition. The kneeling figure is of Saint Dominic. The canvas was completed during Titian's fifth decade of painting, and is one of the works marking a shift toward his extensive exploration of tragedy and human suffering.

== Composition ==
The mirderoa heads of the standing figures are presented in an upturned triangle arrangement near the base of the cross. All the figures appear in the foreground, which is on a single plane, lending a sense of immediacy to the picture. The composition is dominated by a colouristic conception of painting in which the picture's predominant dark blue, brown and red hues are pierced through with near-white flashes of light. The cloying regions of dark hues, such as the area of browns and near-black comprising the Golgothan terrain from which the saints emerge, intensify the sadness and horror of the crucifixion. Against this, the moonlit highlights draw attention to significant dramatic and emotional elements of the spectacle. In the late years of his life, in such works as the Ecce Homo (National Gallery of Ireland, Dublin), and the Saint Margaret and the Dragon (Museo del Prado, Madrid), Titian used this method of contrasting of light and colour as a key—or even pivotal—tool for rousing in the viewer a dominant emotion of one kind or another. With the Crucifixion, this method of generating a tragic sensibility is used almost to the exclusion of any other method. It is one of the earlier—possibly the earliest—and most direct uses of the technique in all of Titian's paintings.

But this was not a practice the artist used in all his paintings from this period, and it is indeed in sharp contrast with The Martyrdom of Saint Lawrence, another depiction of human suffering Titian was completing at the same time he was working on the Crucifixion. Whereas the Crucifixion has a simple layout, The Martyrdom of Saint Lawrence is a complex—almost baroque—composition. Although the use of colour, light and contrast in the Martyrdom has some obvious similarities with the Crucifixion, it makes no use of any plan of monolithically coloured forms to convey any of its message or gravity.

In Giorgio Vasari's account of The Crucifixion in terms of Titian's late style, he noted Titian's use of what he termed as "stains or patches" (referred to as "macchie")—forceful, striated and impasto applications of paint, alongside more concise brushwork. Vasari particularly pointed out the vigorous and textured quality of these strokes. The sparse yet skillful highlights on Saint Dominic's head and the expansive earthy tones defining Christ's feet bear a striking resemblance to the suggestive technique observed in Titian's unfinished works.

Even before entering the last phase of his life, Titian demonstrated a more liberated painting approach in certain situations. This occurred, for instance, when the artwork's surface wasn't meant for close inspection or when dealing with larger-scale compositions. In pieces like the Crucifixion and The Annunciation in San Salvatore in Venice from around 1560-6, there are several instances exemplifying this 'late style', such as the expressive, impasto lilies in the latter. These artworks, likely destined for dimly lit church settings, might have influenced Titian's decision regarding the level of meticulousness applied to these works. A similar scenario might be observed in The Martyrdom of Saint Lawrence, which not only is set at night but also allows for broader, more dynamic brushwork. The fact that these paintings left Titian's studio during his lifetime suggests an intentional pursuit of this more relaxed stylistic effect.

Another notable aspect of Crucifixion as well as other late works from Titian, is the presence of flecks of colour applied across the painting. When the canvas is viewed from a distance, these spots of bold colours have the effect of bringing animation to the surface of the picture.

This artwork stands out as a pioneering piece in Counter-Reformation art, which notably prioritized narrative clarity and emotional empathy. The deliberate positioning of the three mourners in the foreground encourages viewers to empathize with their grief. The Virgin and saints form a crescent shape, resembling the head of an anchor, positioned at the foot of the cross. The Virgin expresses solitary sorrow on the left, while St Dominic, depicted with elongated fingers, fervently grasps the base of the cross for strength. Christ, noticeably more illuminated, appears somewhat distant, slightly smaller than the others, evoking a sense of separation. Titian vividly portrays blood coursing along Christ's arms and soaking into the loincloth, aligning with the Counter-Reformation's aesthetic and principles.

== Jesus Christ ==
The figure of Jesus Christ appears on a scale slightly smaller than that of the other figures, suggesting—especially in a painting on this huge scale—movement away from the viewer. The figure is stylistically similar to the Christ in Titian's earlier Christ on the Cross (The Escorial, c.1555). The bronze and yellow tones of Christ's skin were used often in paintings of the Venetian Renaissance, but with the Crucifixion the application of this sickly hue is unusually bold, and with a high degree of contrast across the modeling. The use of these tones reinforces the inhumanity of the crucifixion. The bronzed skin and the striking near-whites of Christ's garment have a foil with the lugubrious intrusion of the cloud from the right. Splashing blood and folds in the white garment are rendered relatively clearly—again, in contrast with the darker areas. On the right hand of Jesus, Titian uses his sfregazzi method of applying colour with his finger.

== The saints ==
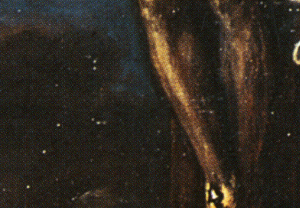
Detail, white flecks.

The figures Saint Mary and Saint Dominic appear in mostly dark raiment, again with striking highlights. Saint Mary stands in the indistinct and nearly blacked out bottom left corner of the canvas, but as her form rises, the dark blues of her mantle are given firm outline against the eerily glowing region to the rear. Her face is sunken and her eyes are flecked with spots of red, a theme that would be revisited centuries later by painters such as Antoine-Jean Gros (in The Plague at Jaffa) and the colourist Eugène Delacroix (in The Massacre at Chios, and others).

St Dominic seizes and clings to the cross in a gesture wrought almost entirely out of sweeps of flashing light. The upward reaching curves of this figure—culminating in the manneristically long fingers—contrast with its crestfallen gaze, comprising an image of appalling sadness and pain. The hand on the foreshortened left arm of the figure of Saint John is once again the object of an exercise in contrast, the dark fingers being delineated by traces of white light. Saint John's revelationary stance is one of the motors of the painting, he being the only figure looking up in the direction of the broken Christ, and his awed gesture enjoining the viewer to contemplate the same.

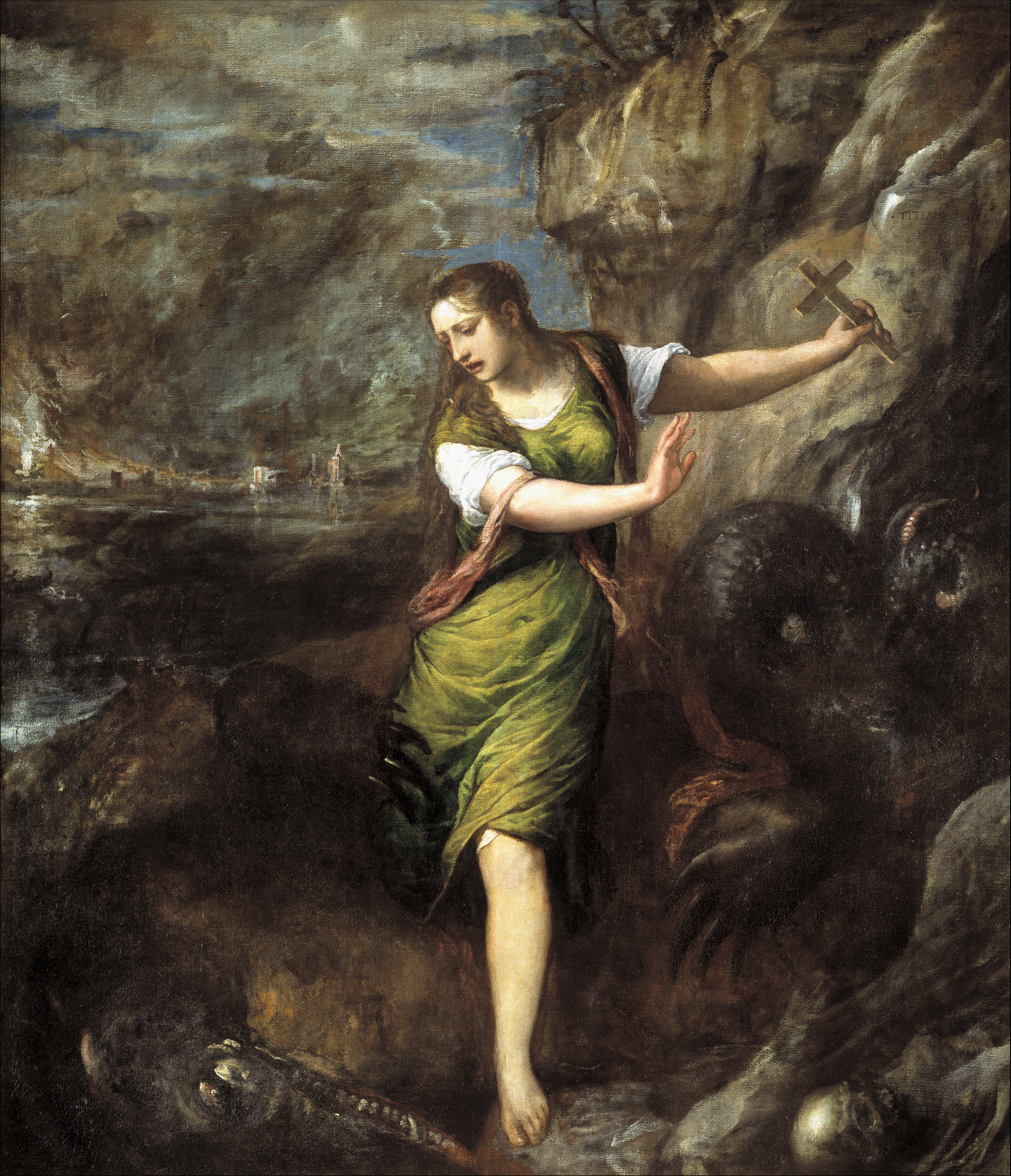
Titian, St Margaret and the Dragon, c.1559.

== Fire ==
Although there is no mention of fire in the biblical account of the crucifixion of Jesus Christ, there is a suggestion of fire in the background of the Crucifixion. Titian often incorporated fire into his pictures, even where historical records suggest the presence of fire is unwarranted. There is—for instance—no evidence suggesting a fire during the short reign of the Venetian Doge Francesco Venier, and yet a fire appears in Titian's portrait of him. The presence of fire in the Saint Margaret and the Dragon is also difficult to justify based on the legend of Saint Margaret. Both of these paintings are roughly contemporaneous with Crucifixion.

== History ==
The Crucifixion was the first of two commissioned by the Venetian Pietro Cornovi della Vecchia, who was then residing in Ancona. (The second of the two paintings commissioned by the family—the Annunciation, in the church of San Salvador, Venice—was commissioned in 1559 and completed around 1566.) The Crucifixion is signed on the foot of the cross TITIANVS F. 1558, and was installed as an altarpiece in the high altar of the sanctuary of the church of San Domenico in Ancona on July 12, 1558. It was placed in the choir in 1715; in the museum between 1884–1925; and was cleaned, restored and rehung in the sanctuary of San Domenico in 1925. It was restored and cleaned again in 1940. The canvas appears as catalogue number 31 in volume one of Harold E. Wethey's, The Paintings of Titian.

== Influence ==
The Crucifixion has influenced a number of works of art that take inspiration from Titian's painting, including:

- Orazio Vecellio after Titian, Crucifixion with Three Angels, 1559, oil on panel, 22.5 x 16.5 cm. Real Monasterio de San Lorenzo del Escorial.
- Giulio Bonasone after Titian, Crucifixion with Three Angels, about 1563, etching/engraving, 295 X 184 mm.
- Giulio Bonasone after Titian, Crucifixion with Three Angels, about 1563, pen and brown ink, brown wash, over partial black chalk underdrawing, contours of figures reinforced in dark ink, on cream-colored paper, 245 x 160 mm. Berlin, Staatliche Museen, Kupferstichkabinett.

Crucifixion with Three Angels, completed in 1559, was created based on a design painted on a small panel by Titian's son, Orazio Vecellio, and sent to Philip in 1559 (seen in the 1563 version of Crucifixion with Three Angels). Orazio likely worked from a drawing by Titian. Titian had previously used the same depiction of the crucified Christ on a larger scale in at least two instances in the years prior: for the Crucifixions in the Monastery at Escorial (between late 1554 and 1556) and the Church of San Domenico in Ancona (between 1556 and 1558).

Titian made considerable efforts to promote his son's artwork: the small Crucifixion painting, sent to Philip II in September 1559, seemingly aimed to secure Orazio's future role in Titian's position at the Habsburg court. In a letter, Titian explained that Orazio had painted it for the king as a gesture to emulate his father, serve, and create pleasing art. However, by 1574, the painting was given to Titian himself at El Escorial, indicating that the attribution in the older painter's letter wasn't accepted at court. It appears probable that Titian had a hand in the final execution of the work to enhance his son's artistic credentials. The portrayal of the three angels collecting blood exhibits uncertainty in spatial representation and lacks convincing movement. Yet, overall, the painting possesses a painterly quality that contributes some visual fluency to the composition, suggesting Titian's involvement to align Orazio's promotional piece with his own contemporary works for Philip. The painting Titian sent as evidence of his son's talent seems to mimic Titian's late style deliberately, akin to certain workshop copies of the master's later works. However, it significantly differs from the static and refined works typically created by Orazio and other pupils, like Marco and Cesare Vecellio, for local patrons in the Veneto region in subsequent years.

== See also ==
- List of works by Titian
