= St. Magnus =

St. Magnus may refer to:

== People ==
- Magnus of Anagni, 2nd-century bishop and martyr in Anagni, Italy
- Magnus of Cuneo, 3rd-century martyr
- Magnus Erlendsson, Earl of Orkney (1075–1116/7), martyred saint in Orkney, now in Scotland
- Magnus of Füssen (probably 7th or 8th century), missionary saint in Allgäu, now in Germany
- Magnus of Avignon (died 660), Gallo-Roman saint, bishop and governor of Avignon, now in France
- Magnus of Oderzo (died 670), Italian saint, founder of eight churches in Venice
- Magnus (bishop of Milan) (active 518 - c. 530)

== Other ==
- St. Magnus, suburb of Bremen, Germany
- St Magnus-the-Martyr, a Church of England church and parish within the City of London

== See also ==
- Albert of Cologne, St. Albertus Magnus, patron saint of medical technicians; those in the natural sciences; philosophers; scientists
