= Marco Angolo del Moro =

Italian painter

Marco Angolo del Moro, (commonly called Angeli), the son and pupil and assistant of Battista, flourished in the latter half of the 16th century at Venice and Verona. He assisted his father in his wall decorations at Murano. He also practised the art of engraving with considerable success.
