= Magnus of Oderzo =

Saint Magnus
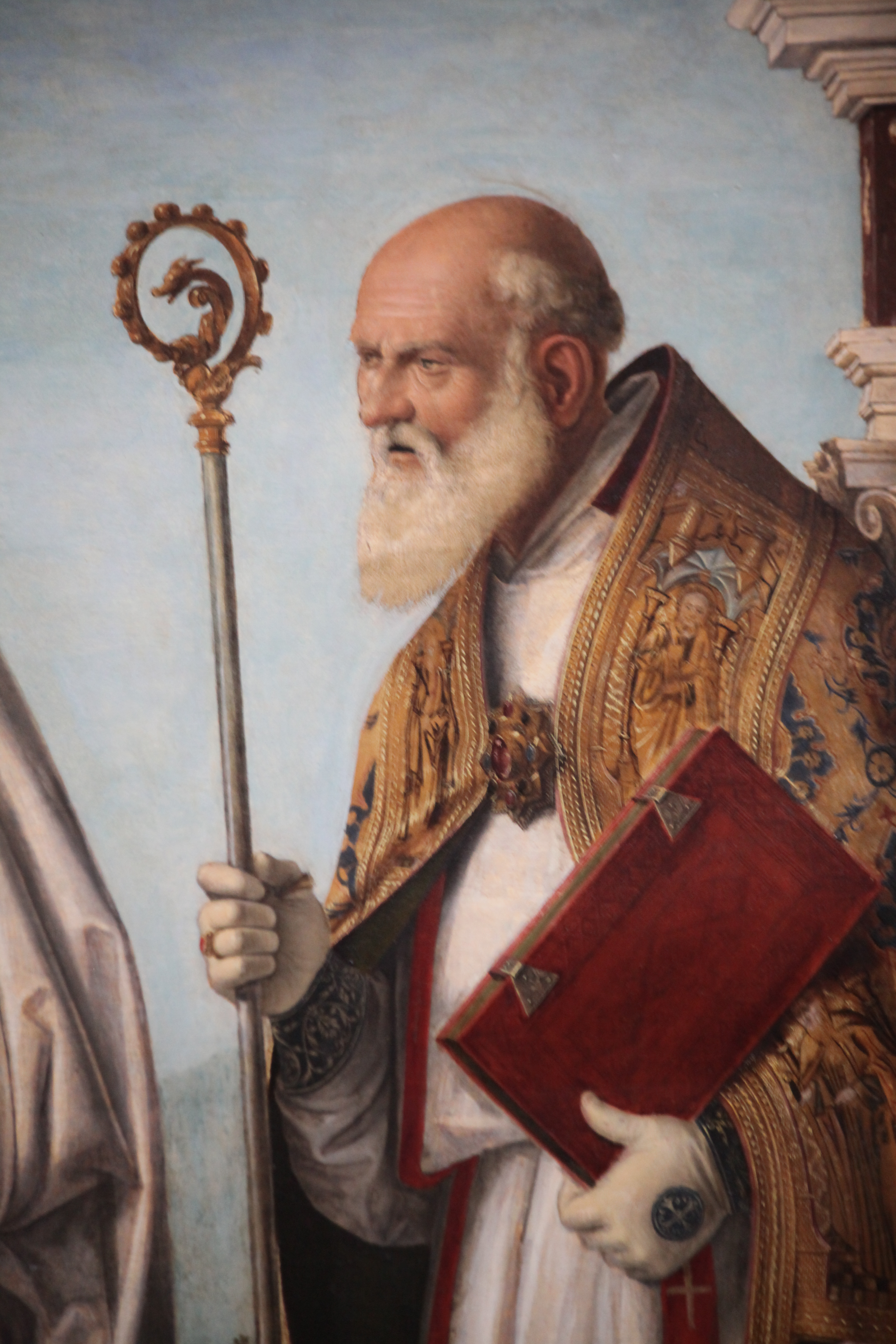
- Detail of Incredulity of St Thomas with Bishop Magno by Cima da Conegliano

Bishop
- Born: Venice, Italy
- Died: 670
- Venerated in: Roman Catholic Church; Eastern Orthodox Church
- Canonized: Pre-congregation
- Feast: 6 October

Saint Magnus of Oderzo (Italian: San Magno di Oderzo) was a 7th-century Italian saint who is notable for founding some of the earliest churches in Venice. He was Bishop of Oderzo and traveled to Venice in 638 because of the Lombard invasion of Italy. There, he founded the churches of Santi Apostoli, San Pietro di Castello, Santa Maria Formosa, Santa Giustina, San Giovanni in Bragora, San Zaccaria, San Salvador and Angelo San Raffaele.

He died in 670 and his remains are reportedly buried in the church of San Geremia in Venice.
