= San Giovanni in Bragora =

Church in Venice, Italy

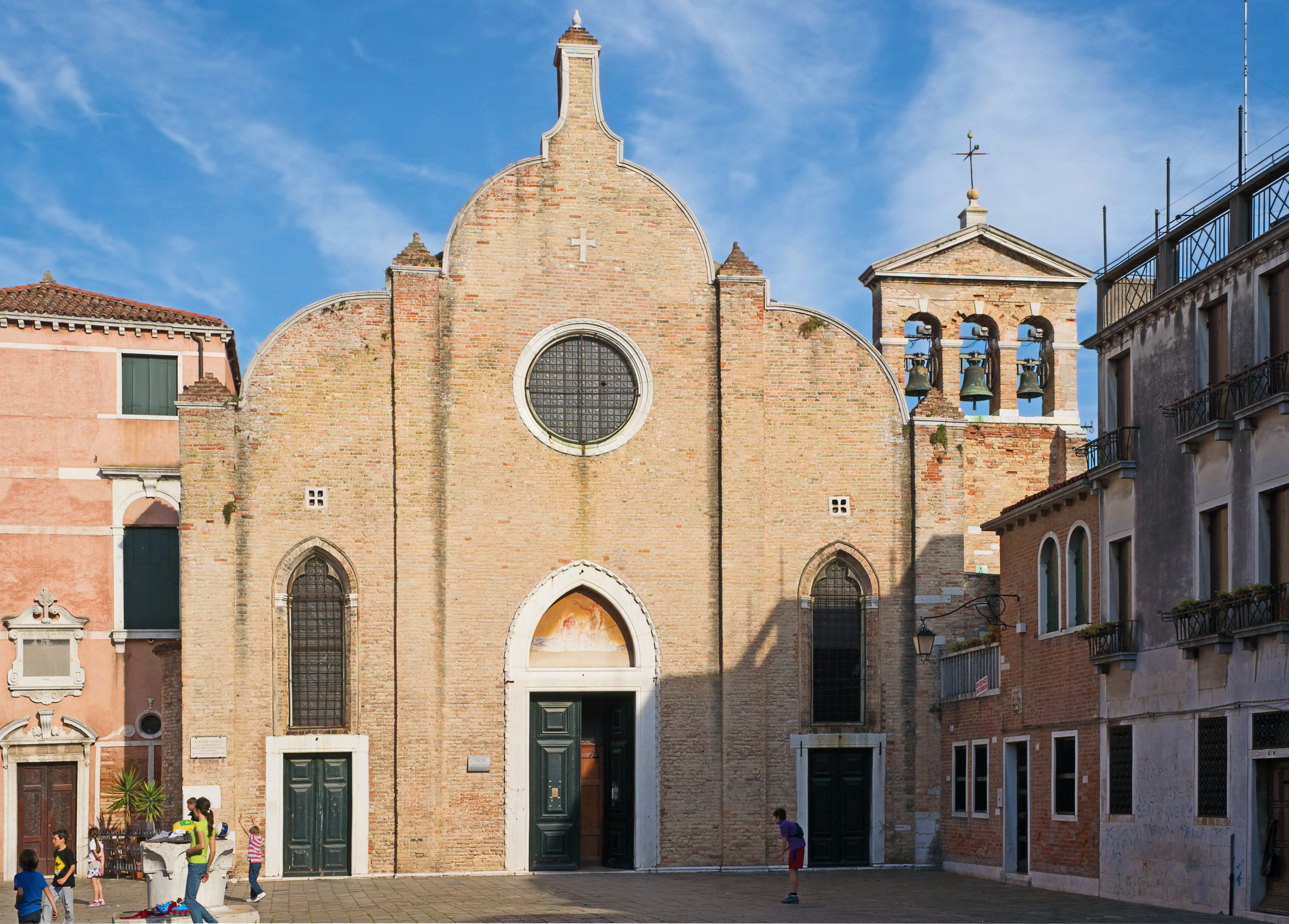
- San Giovanni in Bragora in Venice

- Location within Venice Location within Italy

Religion
- Affiliation: Roman Catholic
- Province: Venice

Location
- Location: Venice, Italy
- Interactive map of San Giovanni in Bragora
- Coordinates: 45.4344°N 12.347°E

Architecture
- Completed: 8th century

San Giovanni in Bragora is a church in Venice, Italy, located in the sestiere of Castello.

== History ==
It was founded in the early 8th century, allegedly by St. Magnus of Oderzo; in the following century, under doge Pietro III Candiano, it was rebuilt to house the alleged relics of St. John the Baptist, to whom it is dedicated, and again in 1178. Pietro Barbo, future Pope Paul II, and Antonio Vivaldi were baptised in the church. It houses the relics of John the Merciful.

The current appearance dates from the last renovation (1475-1505), which kept the basilica plan but added a brickwork façade in local late-Gothic style, and a façade divided into three sections.

The interior houses works by Cima da Conegliano (Baptism of Christ, 1492 and St. Helena and Constantine at the Cross, 1501–1503) and Alvise Vivarini and has a trussed ceiling.

The origin of the term Bragora is unclear. It could derive from the Greek agorà (square), referring to the campo facing the church, or from the dialect bragora ("market") or bragolare ("fishing"). It could also be from the word brago, meaning mud, on account of the former swampy state of islands of Venice.

It is the church where Antonio Vivaldi was baptised in 1678. It is thought his family lived close to the church at the time.

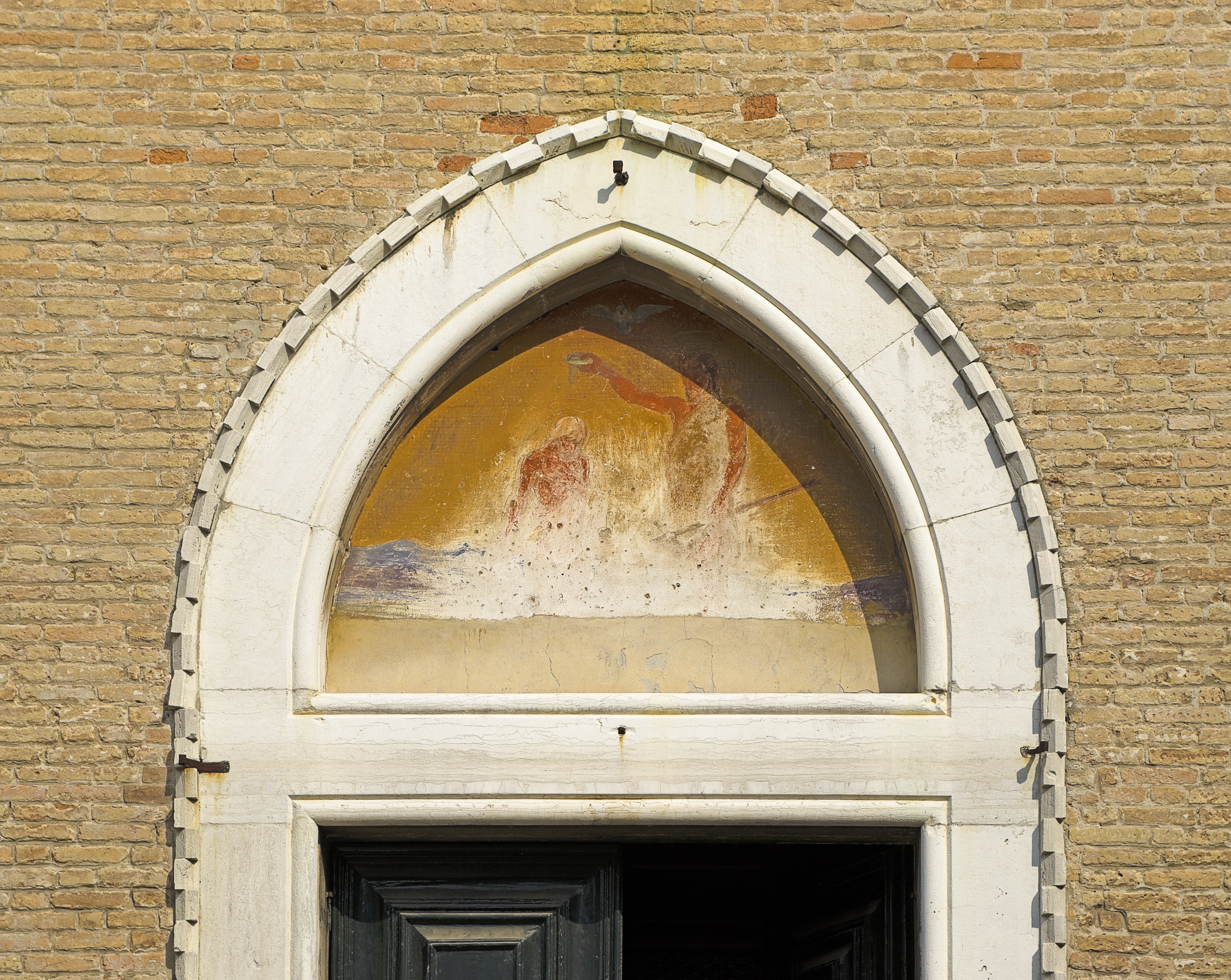
Feature of the tympanum of the door

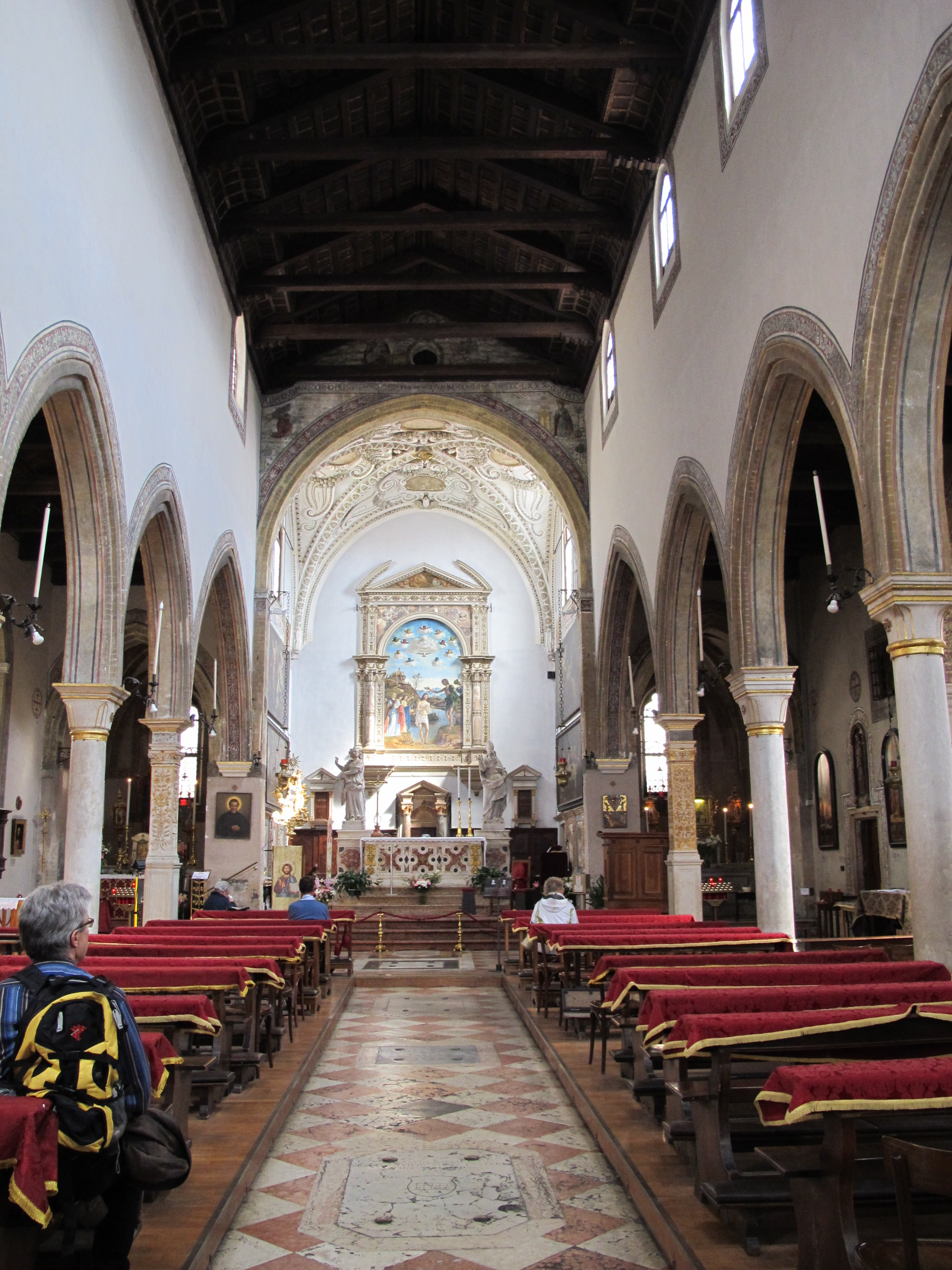
View of the Nave

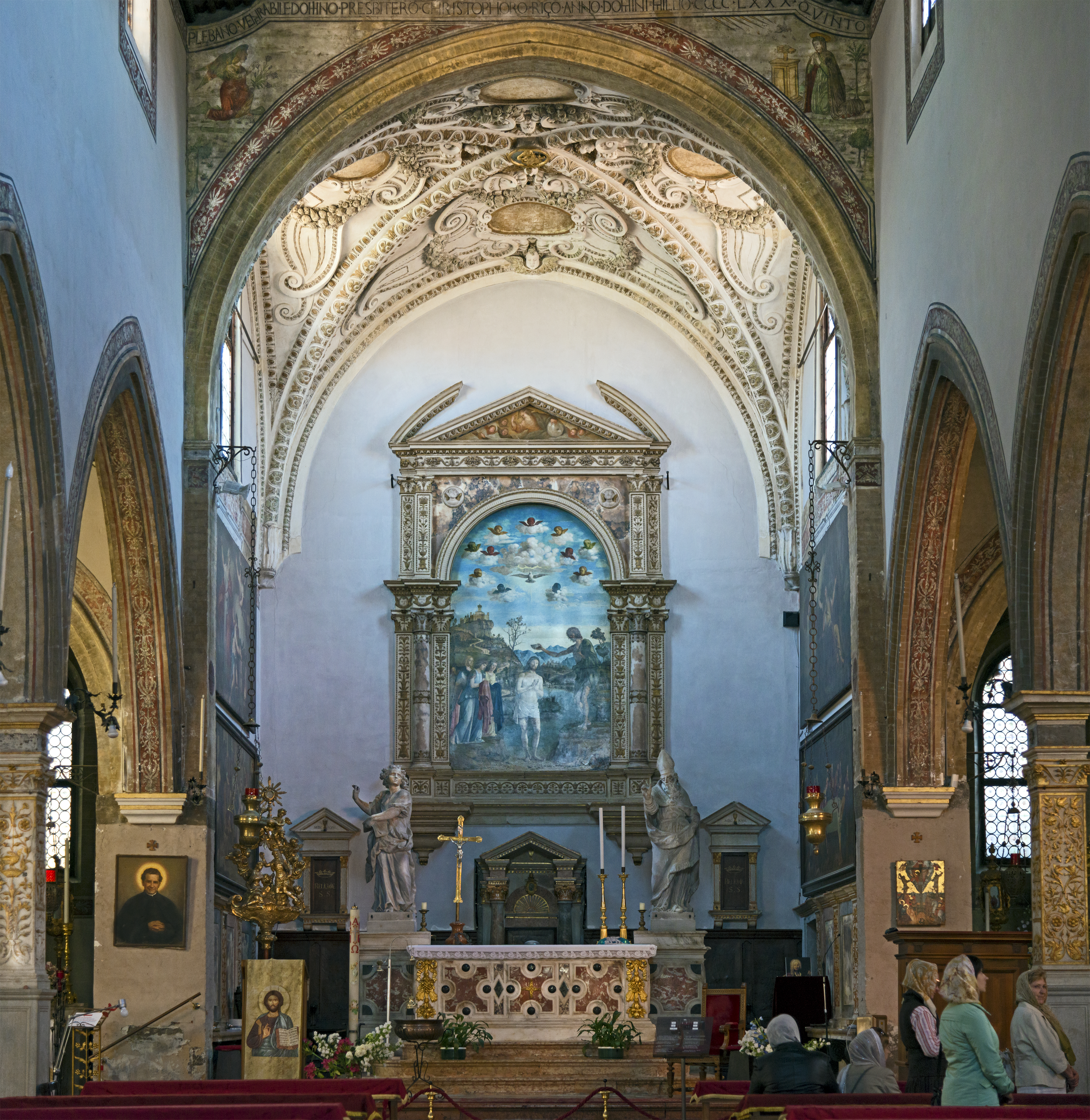
The Presbyterium

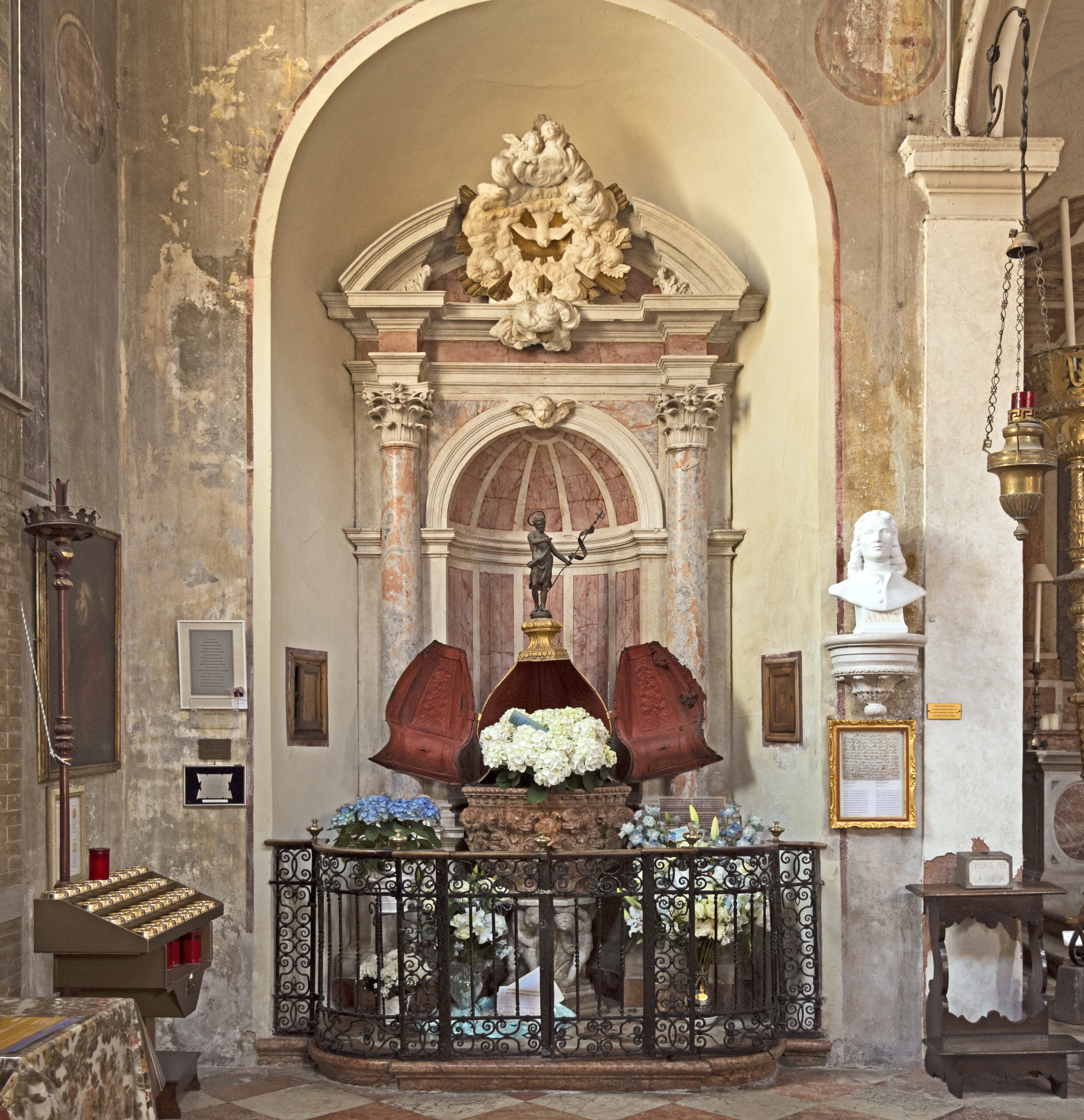
Baptismal font

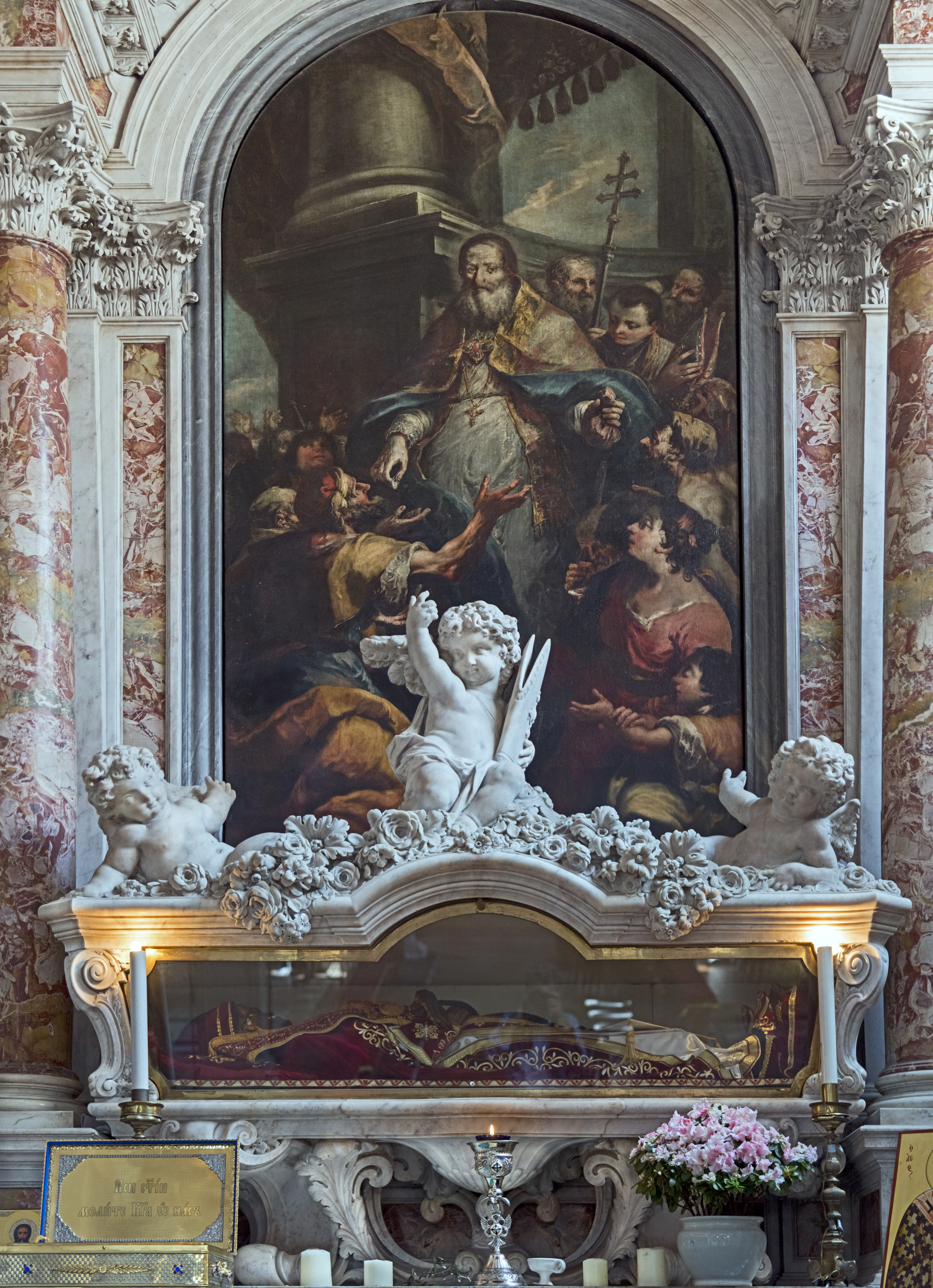
Funerary monument of John the Merciful
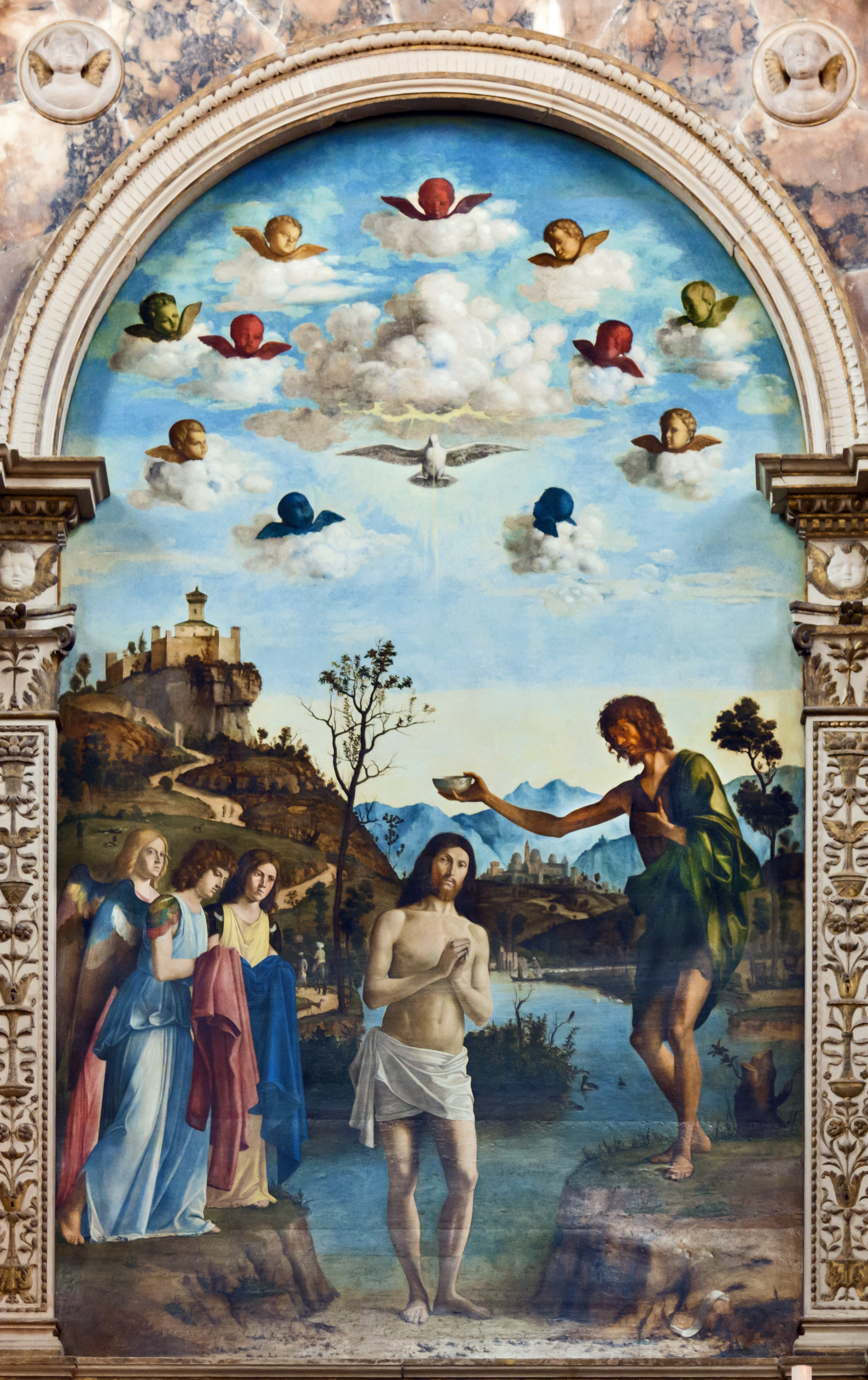
Cima da Conegliano Baptism of Christ

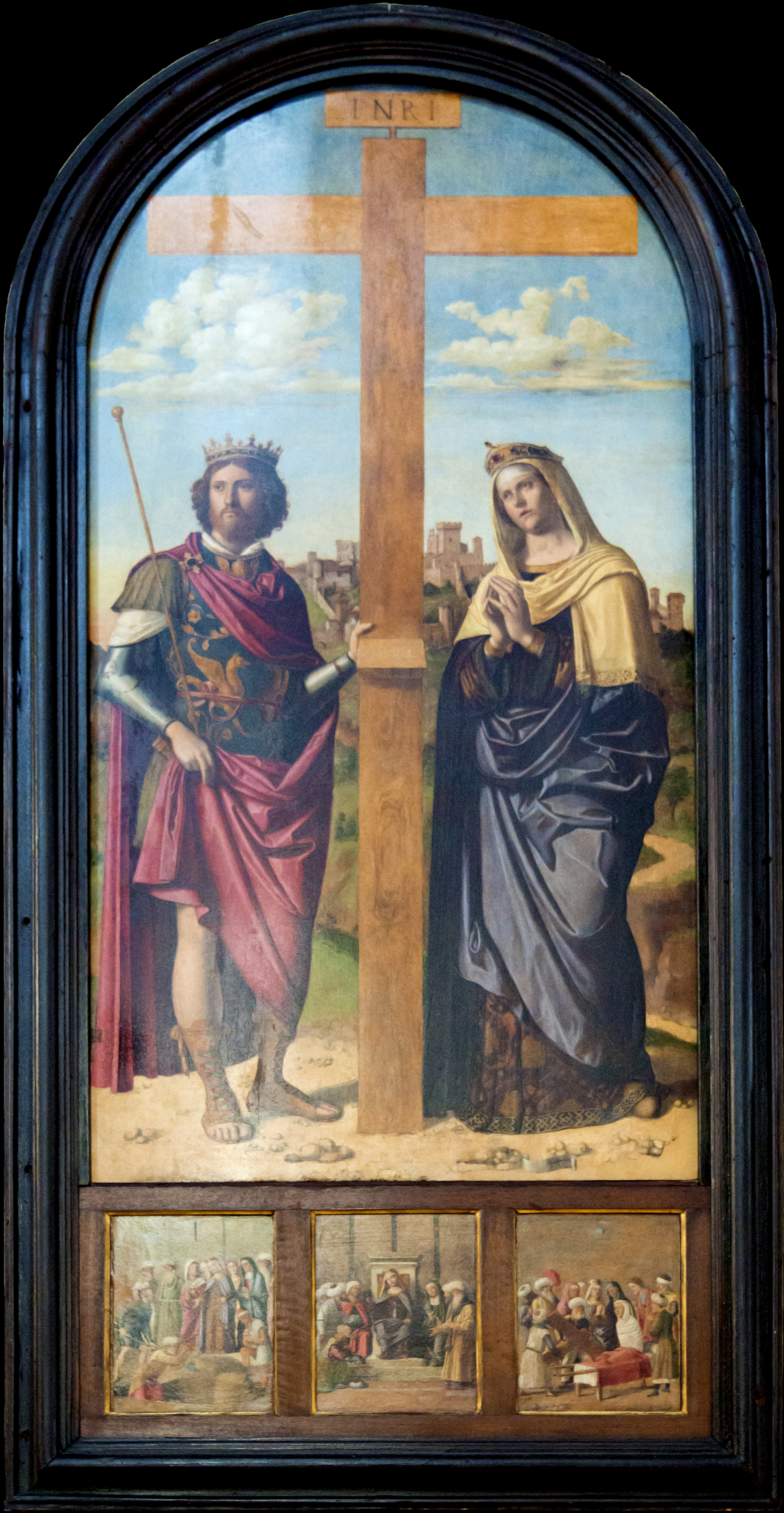
Cima da Conegliano Sant'Elena e Costantino ai lati della Croce

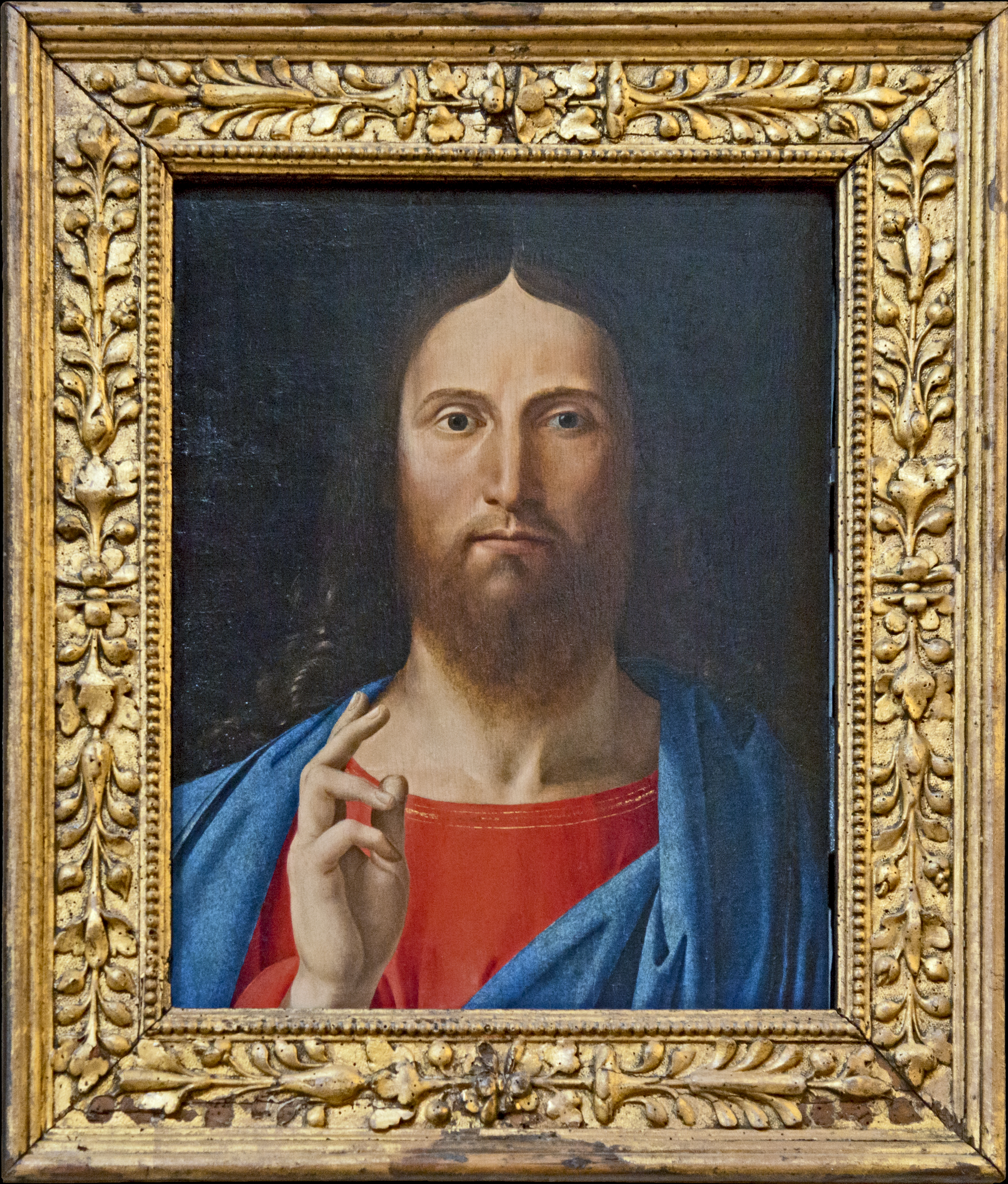
Alvise Vivarini, Cristo benedicente

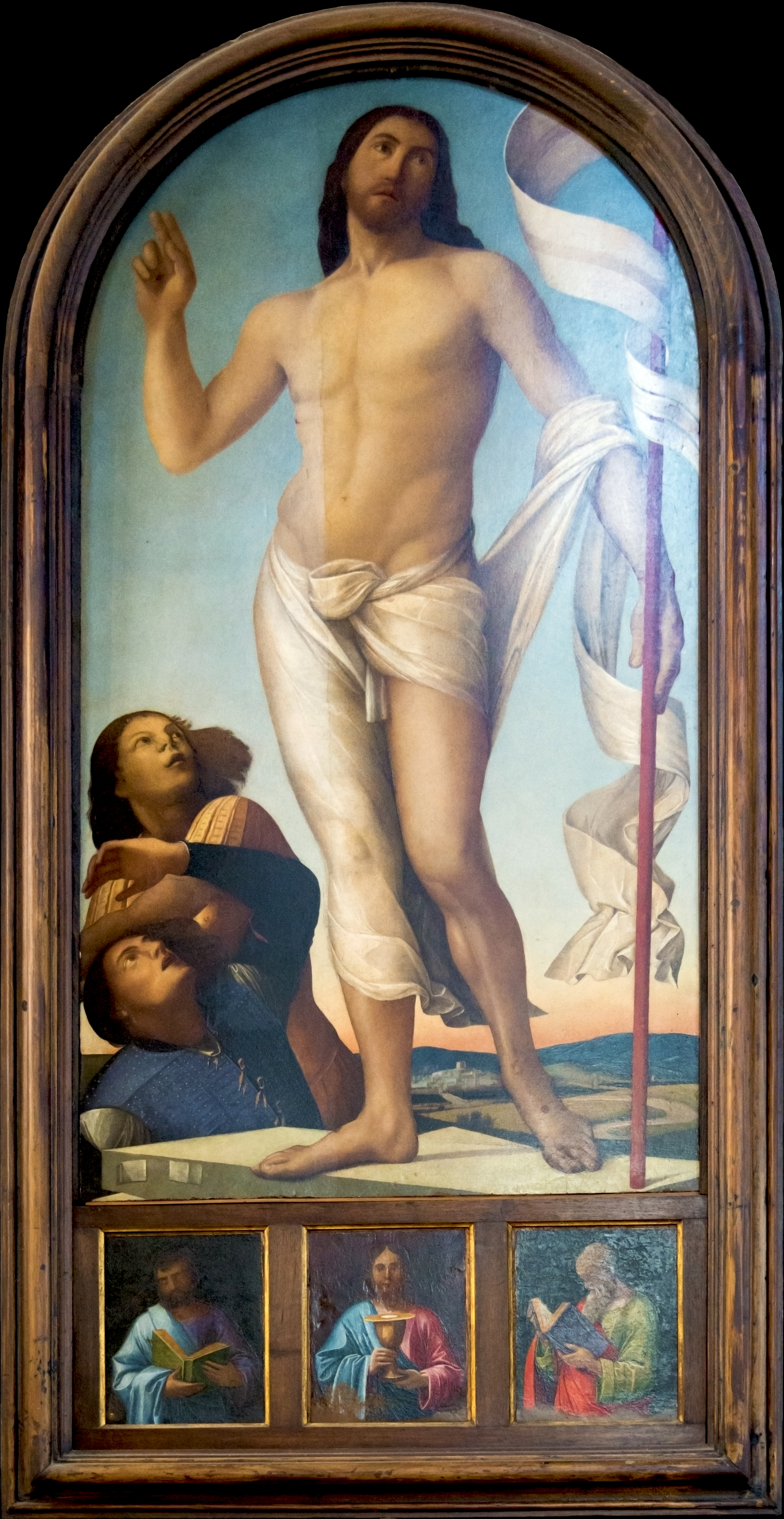
Alvise Vivarini, Cristo risorto

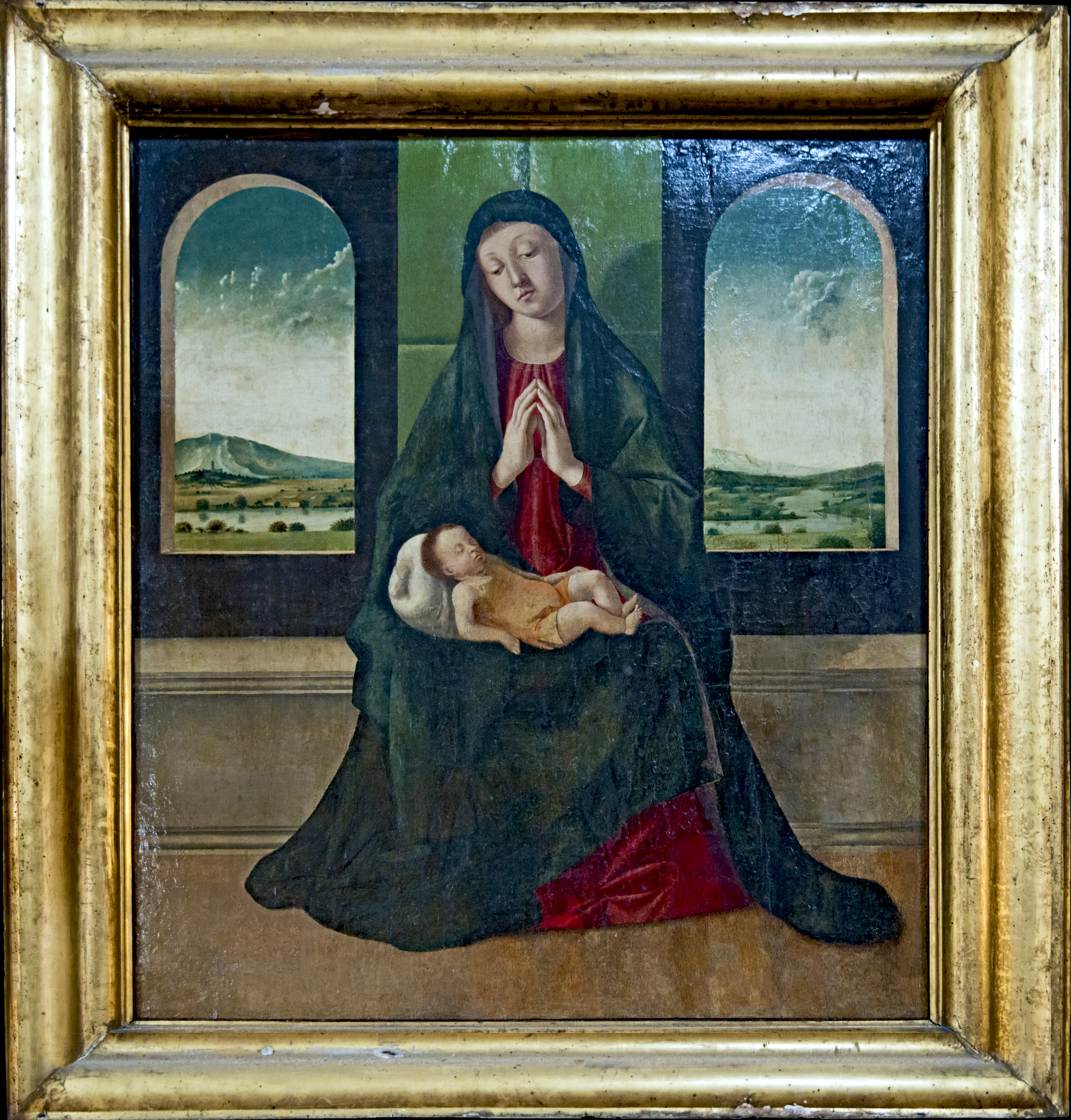
Alvise Vivarini, Madonna col Bambino

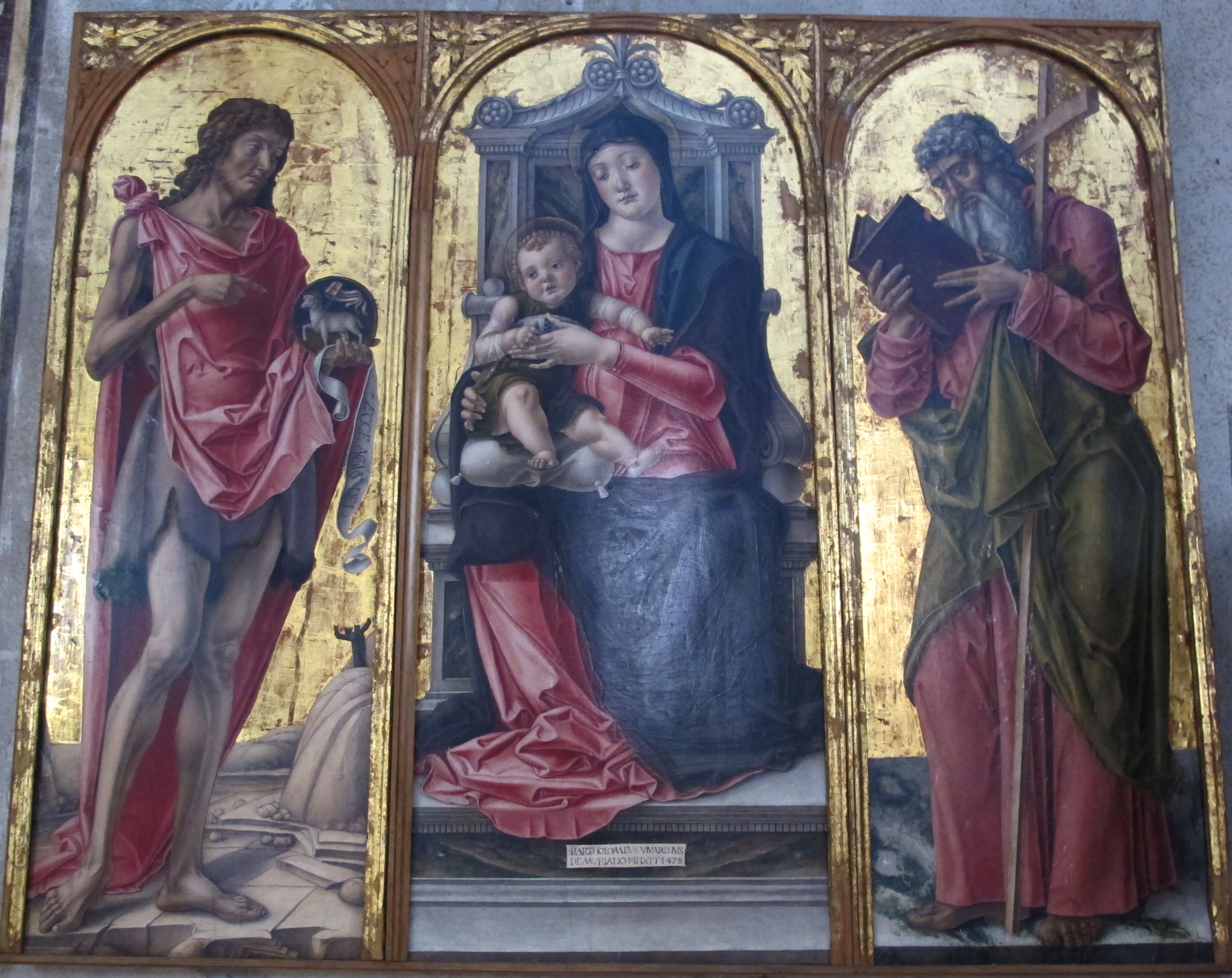
Bartolomeo Vivarini Madonna col Bambino e Santi
