= Annunciation (church of San Salvador) =

Painting by Titian

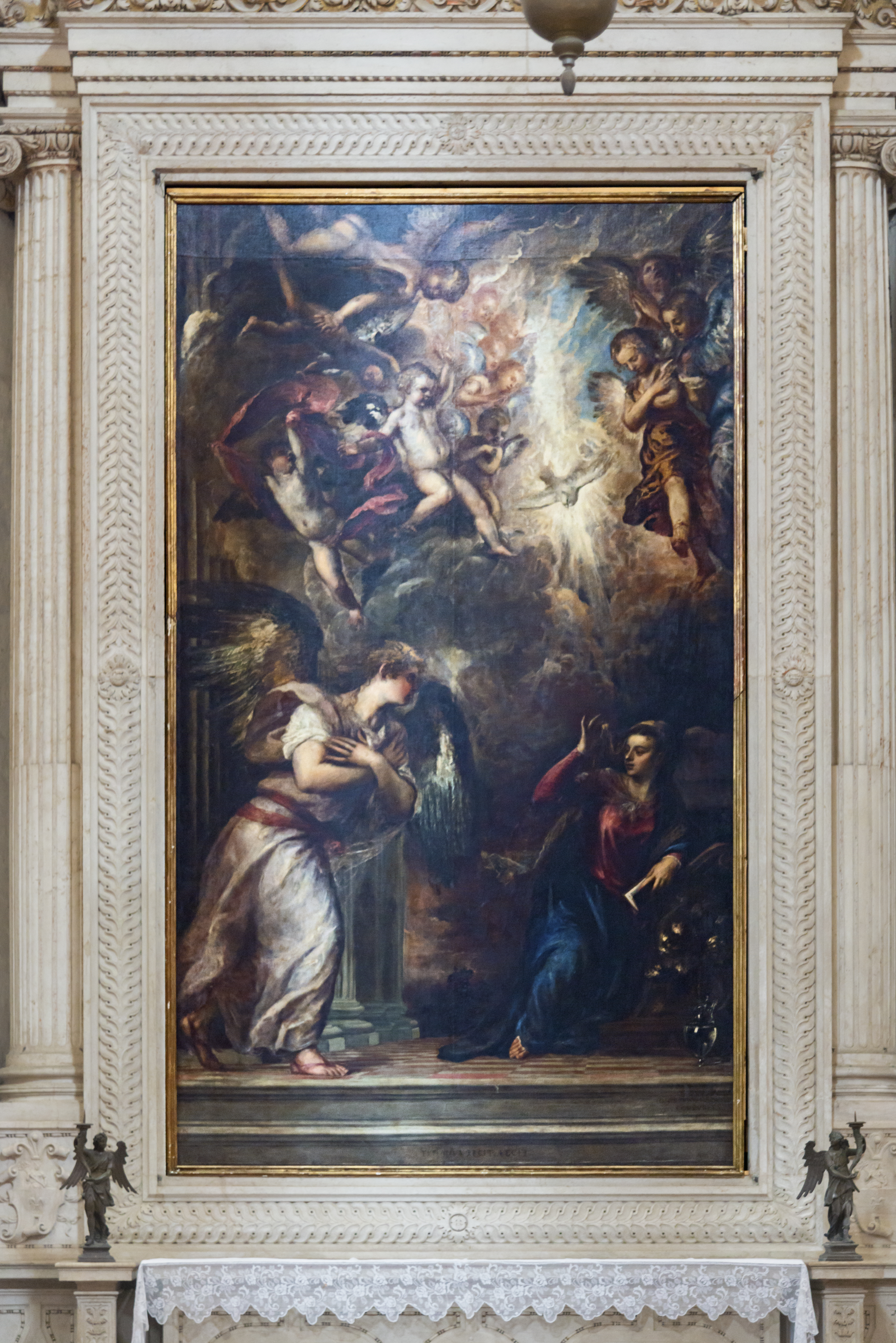
- Artist: Titian
- Year: 1559–1564
- Medium: Oil on canvas
- Dimensions: 410 cm × 240 cm (160 in × 94 in)
- Location: Church of San Salvador; Venice

The Annunciation is a painting by the Italian Renaissance master Titian, executed between 1559 and 1564. It remains in the church of San Salvador in Venice, for which it was commissioned.

Originally three paintings were commissioned by the D'Anna family for their chapels in the church of San Salvador in Venice, northern Italy. Only two out of the three remains in place in the church. The other pieces that were commissioned were a Transfiguration dated around 1560, as the altarpiece of the high altar, and a Crucifixion now in the Church of San Domenico, Ancona. The painting depicts the scene when the Virgin Mary being told that she is carrying the child of God, called the Annunciation of the Virgin.

== Composition ==
The lower figures are Mary (mother of Jesus) and Gabriel. Mary is in shown in a degree of shock but Titian using his colours brings out the sight of the angel. This is most evident in his handling of light. A heavenly light pours from an opening in the sky into the place of the Annunciation.

There have been opinions on the different usage of colour in the painting from Giorgio Vasari to Charles Hope. Hope's opinion ”disliked use of the muddy colours, the physical types, the mannered pose of the Virgin or the badly drawn figure of Gabriel and the inept use of gesture”. Hope's observation is an extension from Vasari's criticism. While Bohde explains that "muddy colours" and the physicality of the figures makes the composition of Titian's Annunciation so good.

Bohde says, "Titian’s painting ultimately deals with the transformation of the immaterial into the material, which is the core of the incarnation theme". The figures itself explains the main theme of incarnation of God within the Virgin. This theme comes thought with the dove in the back that pours out amounts of light from the clouds. The figures are different from other versions of the story annunciation in other Venetian works Titian does not connect to the myth of the city of Venice founded on the day of Annunziata. As Bohde states "Titian merely connects the place of the Annunciation with the interior of San Salvador through the red and white tiled floor and the row of columns. But these features mainly serve to unify the pictorial and the real space, and are not significantly Venetian."

The overwhelming size of the angel compared to the Virgin and the brush strokes being more expressive shows the theme of incarnation. Titian's way of depicting the Virgin showing the flesh is more full in her bosom. Making the flesh of the virgin more evident, puts emphasis that Jesus was made from the Virgin's flesh.

== See also ==
- List of works by Titian

== Bibliography ==
- Bohde, D. "Titian's Three-Altar Project in the Venetian Church of San Salvador: Strategies of Self-Representation by Members of the Scuola Grande Di San Rocco." Renaissance Studies 15, no. 4 (2001): 450–472.
- Hope, Charles, Titian, London, Jupiter Books, 1980.
