= Giulio Angolo del Moro =

Italian painter

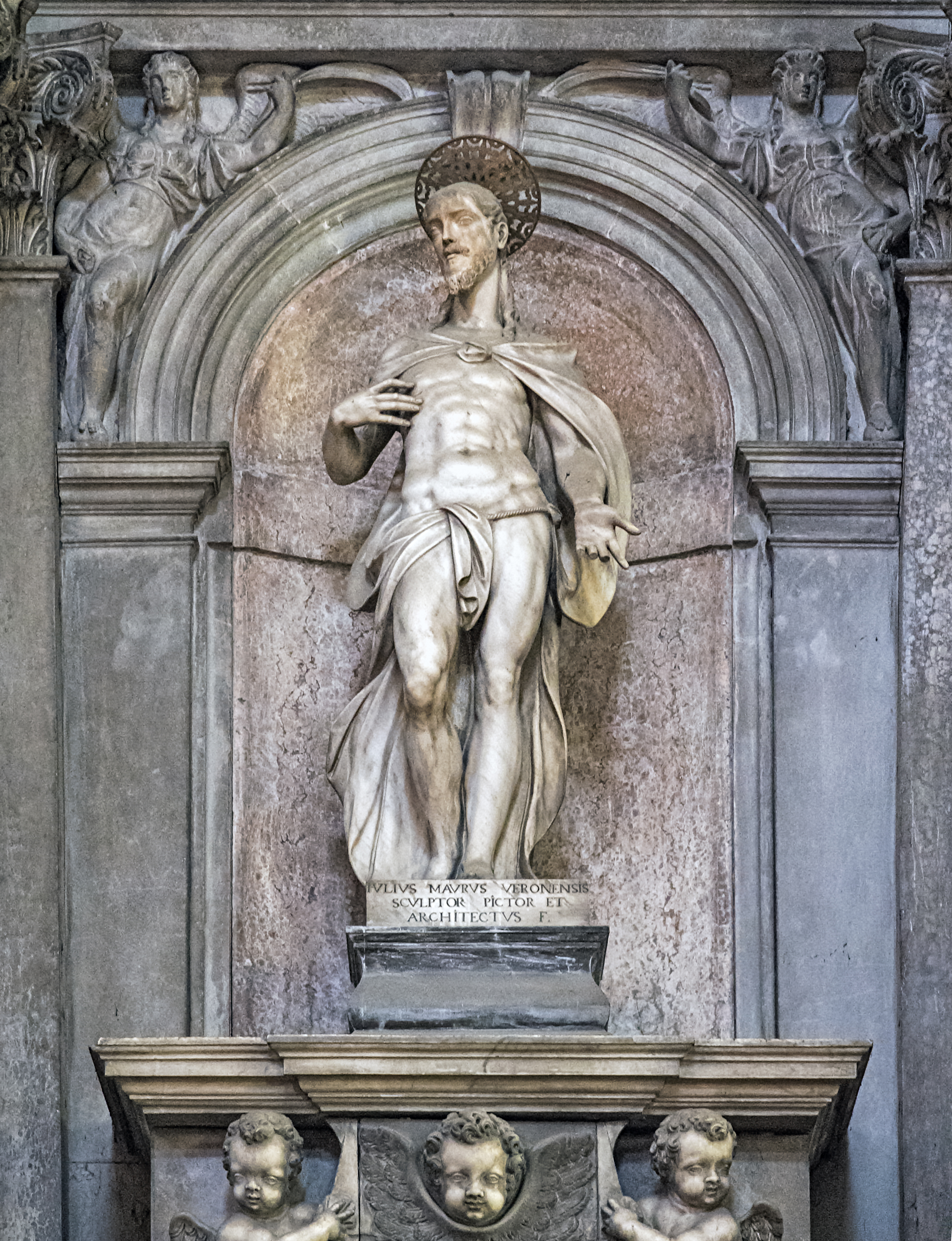
Il Salvatore San Salvador, Venice

Giulio Angolo del Moro, (commonly called Angeli), the brother of Battista, was a sculptor, architect, and painter. He was a native of Verona, but laboured chiefly at Venice, and in the churches and the Doge's Palace of that city he has left several pictures. He flourished in the 16th century and the beginning of the 17th. There is no record of him later than 1618. There was a third brother, Girolamo, who was also a painter, but of no great merit.
