= Giovanni Battista Bertani =

Italian painter and architect

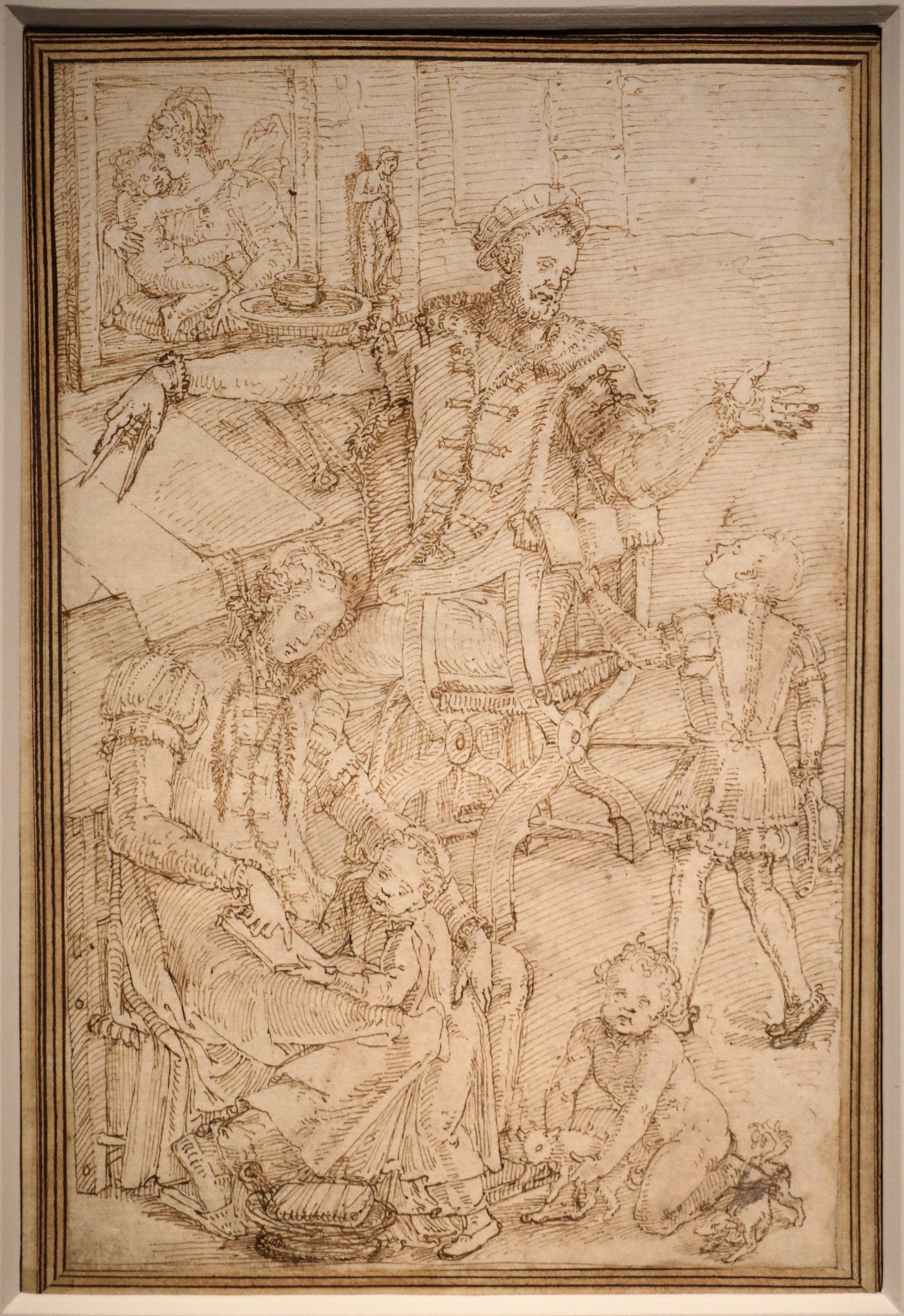
- Self-portrait of Bertani with his family. Drawing in the Gabinetto dei Disegni e delle Stampe of the Uffizi, Florence
- Born: 1516; Mantua, Margravate of Mantua
- Died: 2 April 1576 (aged 59–60); Mantua, Margravate of Mantua
- Education: Giulio Romano
- Known for: Painting and Architecture
- Movement: Mannerism
- Patrons: Vincenzo Gonzaga

Giovanni Battista Bertani (1516 – 2 April 1576) was an Italian architect, painter, sculptor and writer of the late Renaissance period. He trained with Giulio Romano in Mantua, and was promoted after Romano's death to the post of prefect of the ducal studio (fabbriche). Painters who assisted him over the years include his brother Domenico, as well as Battista del Moro, Geronimo Mazzuola, Paolo Farinato, Domenico Brusasorci, Giulio Campi, and Paolo Veronese.

== Biography ==
Giovanni Battista Bertani was born in Mantua in 1516. He was educated in Mantua, was recorded as active 'for many years in Rome and elsewhere' and became known only when he was over 30, due to his design for the triumphal decorations set up in Mantua in January 1549 in honour of Philip II of Spain, son of Emperor Charles V. The success of these decorations won for him the esteem of Cardinal Ercole Gonzaga, and he obtained the prestigious appointment of supervisor of the Cathedral Works (Opera del Duomo) and in May 1549 the title of Prefetto delle Fabbriche Ducali, a post that had remained vacant for almost three years following the deaths, in rapid succession, of Giulio Romano and Battista da Covo. The decree of appointment praises him as a 'supreme architect, excellent painter, refined sculptor', yet the only evidence of his youthful activity as a painter consists of an order (1531) to pay him for a fresco made to Giulio Romano's design on the façade of the Palazzina of Margherita Paleologa at Mantua; the early date of this order has given rise to discussion of Bertani's date of birth, which has been deduced from the Mantuan register of deaths.

In the cathedral, Bertani continued the radical transformation of the interior initiated by Giulio Romano in 1545. In the Ducal Palace, he built a semicircular theatre with stepped seats, modelled on ancient Greek and Roman monuments. This construction—one of the earliest Renaissance examples of a permanent theatre—was destroyed by fire only a few decades later. Bertani's work was decisive in establishing the layout of a large part of the Ducal Palace. In the spacious rectangle of the Palace's Corte della Mostra, he developed in various stages the theme of rusticated architecture first introduced by Giulio Romano. On the long sides of the courtyard, Giulio Romano's vocabulary was given a new rhythm as a result of arches placed beside rectangular openings and framed by paired pilasters on the ground-floor, with spiral columns on the upper storey. The alternation generated by the semicircular arches and straight sections of entablature, which can be interpreted as a sequence of so-called Serlian or Palladian motifs, pervades the majority of Bertani's architectural work and underlines its scenographic nature.

Bertani soon came to the attention of architectural circles in other parts of Italy and, in 1551, was invited to participate in a competition for the design of the Rialto Bridge in Venice. His rapid rise within the hierarchy of the Gonzaga court and in Mantuan society finds its tangible expression in his own house in Mantua, built during the first half of the 1550s. The façade of this 'palazzo' (thus defined by Bertani) has on each side of the main entrance an Ionic column resting on a high pedestal and crowned with a fragment of entablature. On the right side, the order is completely smooth, while on the left, it is made up of sections in order to highlight the projections of the individual elements, which are also identified by inscriptions in Roman lapidary characters.

Bertani's house served as a manifesto of his theoretical ideas and was the forerunner of his treatise Gli oscuri et dificili passi dell'opera ionica di Vitruvio … (1558). This brief volume, complete with numerous illustrations, is dedicated to Cardinal Ercole, and the frontispiece is dominated by the mythical figure of Hercules Killing the Hydra, an engraving by Giorgio Ghisi after an idea by Bertani. The author's defence of the fundamental importance of Vitruvius is in contrast to the relativist and subjective approach that underlies the writing of art treatises in general in the second half of the 16th century. The problems to which Bertani principally devoted his attention are the methods for describing the volutes of the Ionic capital, the profiles of the columns, the various types of fluting and the proportional relationship of doorways. The most original passage on the Ionic order in Bertani's version describes the subdivision of the trunk of the pedestal into projecting bands, similar to those of the architrave, but such an interpretation has been firmly rejected by subsequent readers of Vitruvius.

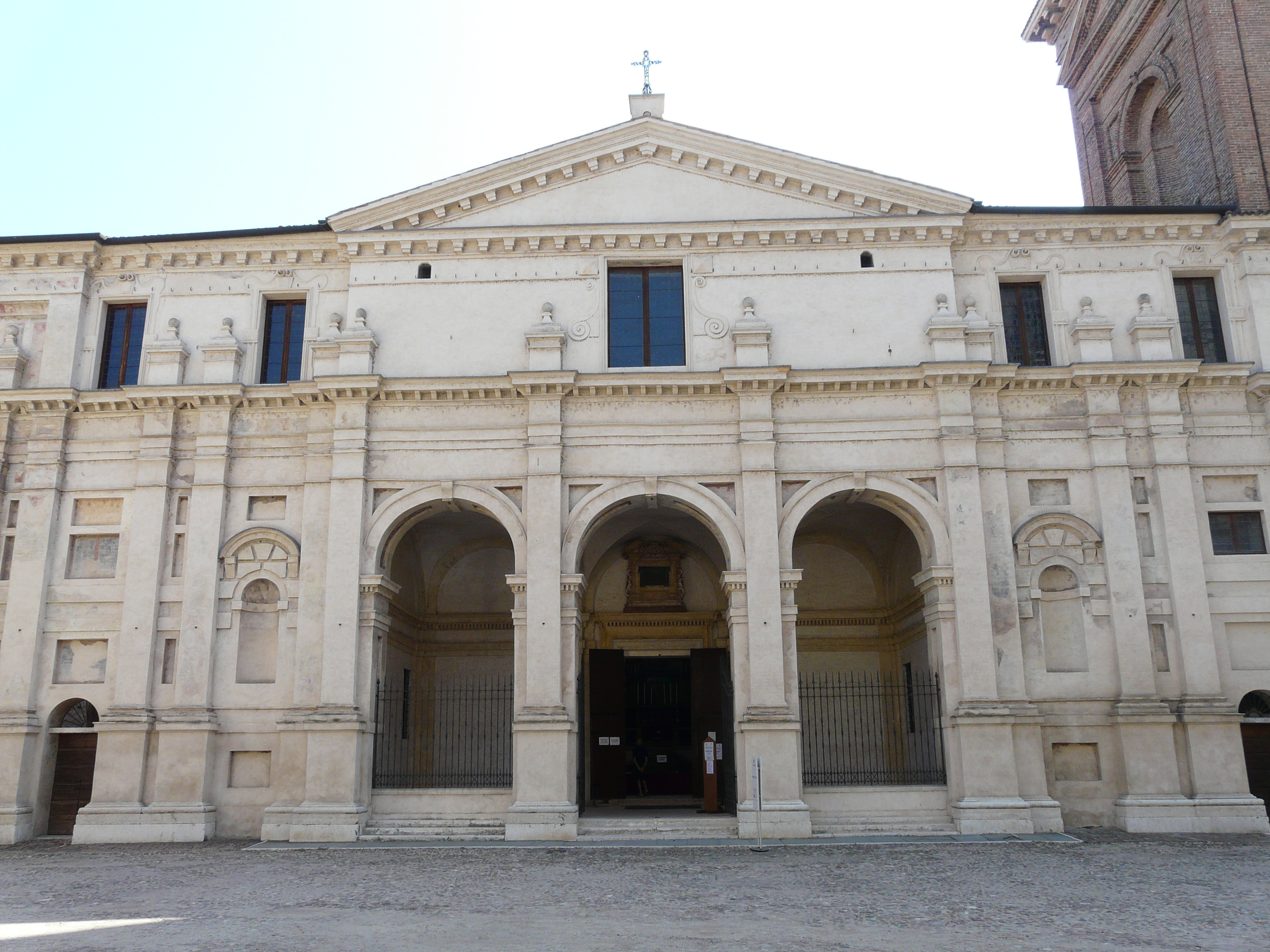
Santa Barbara, Mantua

The correspondence between theory and practice is a fundamental element of Bertani's approach; he cited as a concrete application of the Corinthian order the columns that supported the two organs in Mantua Cathedral. Yet such an approach did not prevent him from freely interpreting the Classical repertory, as at the church of Santa Barbara, erected within the confines of the Ducal Palace for Guglielmo Gonzaga, 3rd Duke of Mantua. The building work, which was undertaken in three successive stages, lasted from 1561 to 1572; a dramatic interlude occurred in 1568, when Bertani was subjected to the rigours of the Inquisition, imprisoned for several months, then obliged to take the oath of abjuration. This large church, with its flanking bell-tower and front portico, has a complex internal spatial organisation. The presbytery is elevated over the crypt, itself divided into a rectangular and an oval area (the first instance of an oval plan in Mantuan architecture). A vertical caesura divides the long nave into two sections, each crowned with a light-filled dome rising from a square base, creating a centralised space. The orders are schematic and reduced almost to an abstract level. Bertani freed himself from the well-established Vitruvian models: he eliminated the bases, reduced the capitals to almost unrecognisable simulacra and varied the heights and proportional relationships of the pilaster strips. The structural function of the orders is subordinated to the rhythm of the cavities and panels, which in turn is emphasised by the multiple niches and blind fenestration. In some of the details, such as the niche on the bell tower bearing the architect's name, the freedom of the classicising vocabulary reaches extremes that have something in common with the tension and energy of Michelangelo's architecture, yet here appears frozen in the play of overlapping geometrical forms.

Also at the Ducal Palace, Bertani supervised the decoration of the summer apartments of the Mostra (e.g. the Loggia dei Frutti, 1561 and 1573) and enlarged Giulio Romano's Troy apartment together with the Galleria dei Marmi and the Sala di Mano. The unnerving variations that Bertani introduced to Classical architecture in no way compromised his faith in the 'true and infallible style' of the 'worthy ancients', which he reaffirmed in 1570 in reply to a question put to him by Martino Bassi in relation to Milan Cathedral. In his brief declaration, Bertani alluded to his experiences in sculpture, of which there remains no material trace. His identity as a painter is equally vague, although his role as coordinator of altarpiece design for the cathedral and for Santa Barbara is confirmed by documents. Also documented is his intervention on a painting by Lorenzo Costa the Younger, but this perhaps predates the composition and is therefore less binding than the designs that had been supplied by Giulio Romano.

== Legacy ==
Bertani's reception from contemporary critics was flattering (despite Vasari's reservations) and continuously lively in subsequent centuries. In the 19th century, however, his work was almost totally neglected, and in the 20th century, too, his intellectualising inventions were often rejected. Bertani was nevertheless an architect who managed to free himself from the cumbersome heritage of Giulio Romano to take his own path within the context of Mannerist architecture.

== Writings ==
- Gli oscuri et dificili passi dell’opera ionica di Vitruvio, di latino in volgare et alla chiara inteligentia tradotti, et con sue figure a luochi suoi. Mantua. 1558.

== Bibliography ==
- Lanzi, Luigi (1847). History of Painting in Italy; From the Period of the Revival of the Fine Arts to the End of the Eighteenth Century. Vol. II. Translated by Thomas Roscoe. London: Henry G. Bohn. pp. 334–335.
- Ticozzi, Stefano (1830). Dizionario degli architetti, scultori, pittori, intagliatori in rame ed in pietra, coniatori di medaglie, musaicisti, niellatori, intarsiatori d'ogni etá e d'ogni nazione. Vol. 1. Milan: Gaetano Schiepatti. p. 221.
- Perina, C.; Pellati, Francesco (1967). "BERTANI, Giovanni Battista". Dizionario Biografico degli Italiani (in Italian). Vol. 9: Berengario–Biagini. Rome: Istituto dell'Enciclopedia Italiana. ISBN 978-88-12-00032-6.
