= Battista del Moro =

Italian painter

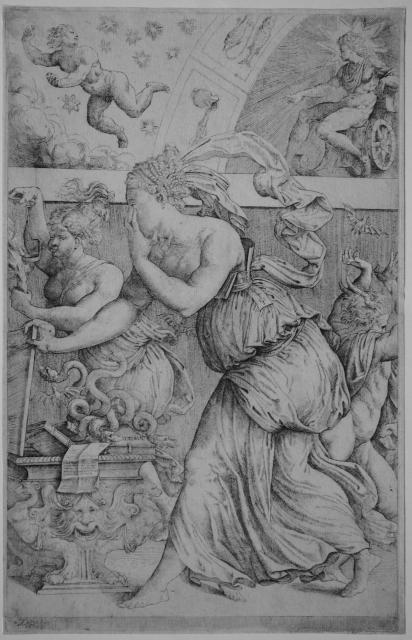
Pandora Opens the Jar, or Allegory of Light by Battista del Moro, 1557

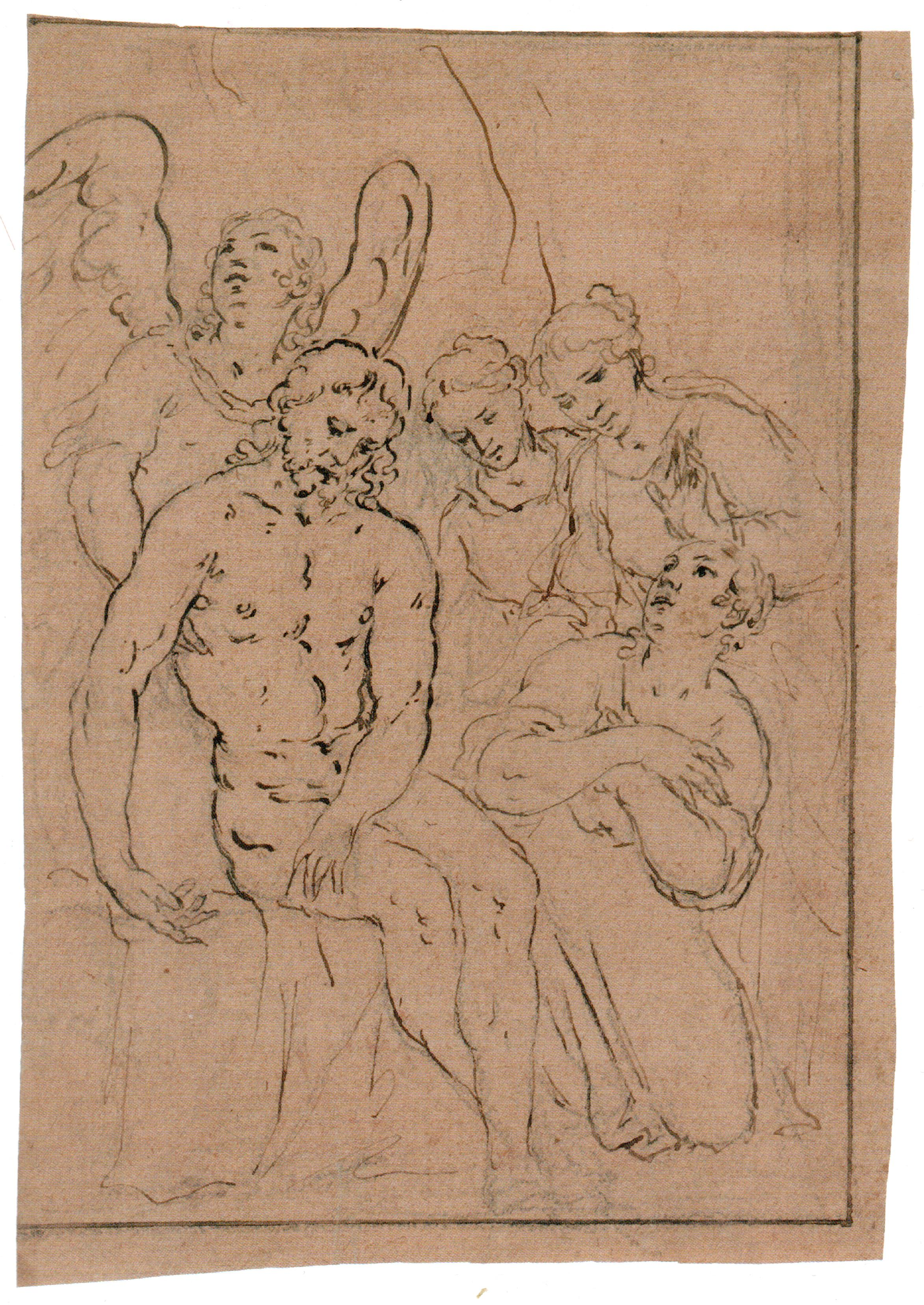
Dead Christ with angel and three Marys

Battista del Moro (1512 – after 1568) was an Italian painter of the Renaissance period active in his native Verona, as well as in Mantua and Venice.

This artists is referred to by various names including Battista D’Agnolo Veronese by Filippo Baldinucci and Giorgio Vasari, or by Battista Angolo del Moro, (commonly called Angeli, and occasionally Angelo and Agnolo). He was a scholar of Francesco Torbido, called Il Moro, whose daughter he married, and whose name he added to his own. He improved his style by studying the works of Titian, and painted several pictures, both in oil and fresco, for the churches at Verona, and sometimes in competition with Paolo Veronese. In Sant'Euphemia he had painted a fresco of 'Paul before Ananias,' which, on the demolition of the wall on which it was painted, was sawn out with great care, and removed to another part of the church. His colouring is more vigorous than that of his instructor, and his design more graceful. Such is his picture in San Stefano of 'An Angel presenting the Palms of Martyrdom to the Innocents'. He also painted much in Venice, Mantua, and Murano. We have several slight but spirited etchings by this master, in which the extremities of the figures are drawn in a very masterly style. In conjunction with Battista Vicentino, he engraved a set of fifty landscapes, mostly after Titian, which are executed in a bold, free style. He labored in Mantua under Giovanni Battista Bertani.

We have also the following plates as specimens of his work in this line :

- The Nativity, or Adoration of the Shepherds; after Parmigiano.
- The Virgin, with the Infant Christ and St. John; B. A. del Moro, fec.
- The Holy Family, with St. Elisabeth and St. John; after Raphael.
- Another Holy Family; after the same.
- The Martyrdom of St. Catherine; after Bernardino Campi.
- The Baptism of Christ by St. John; after the same.

== See also ==
- Giulio Angolo del Moro
- Marco Angolo del Moro
