= San Salvador, Venice =

Church in San Marco, Venice

Church of San Salvador
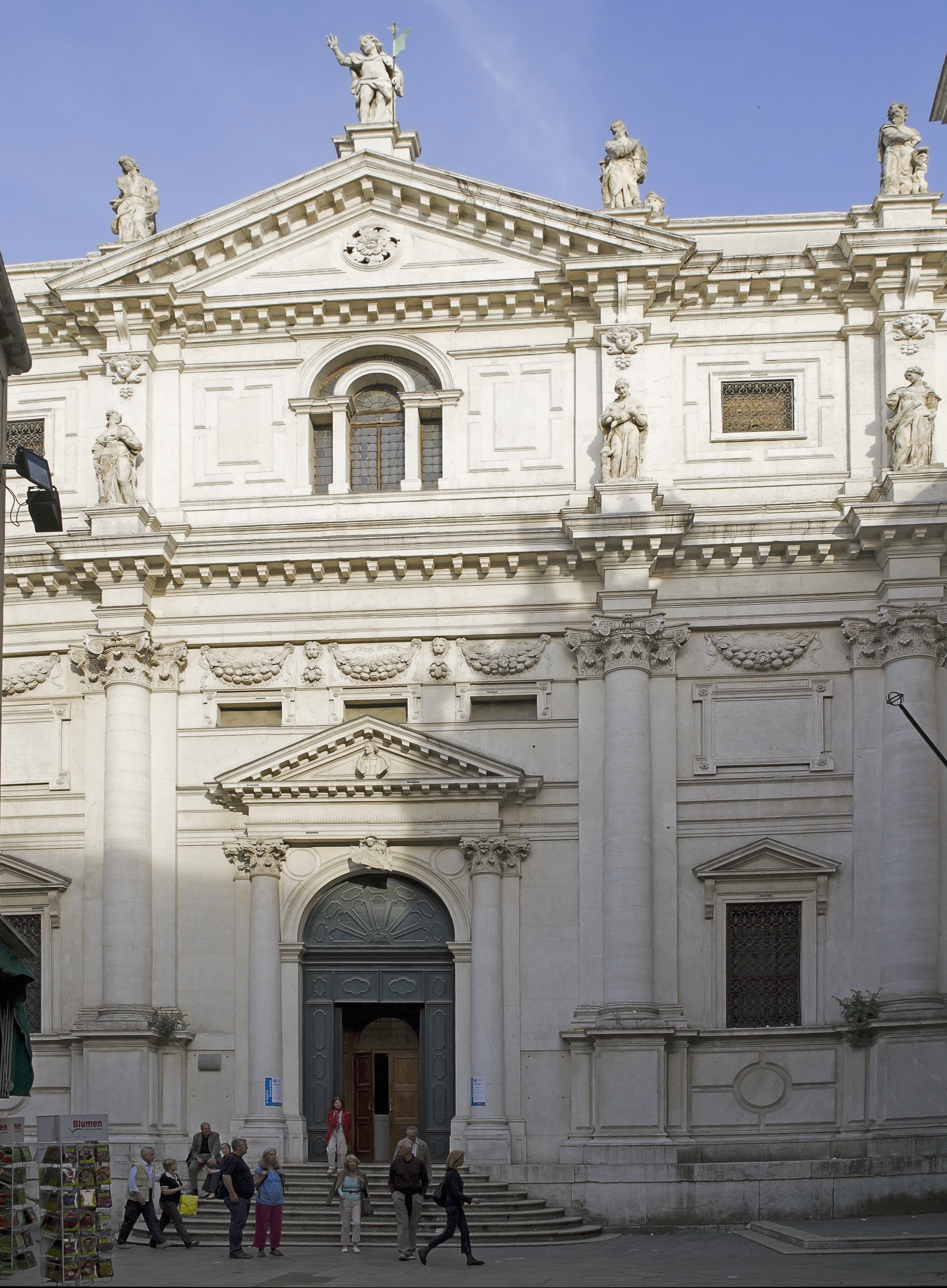
- Face of San Salvador

- Location within Venice Location within Italy

Religion
- Affiliation: Roman Catholic
- Province: Venice

Location
- Location: Venice, Italy
- Coordinates: 45.4366°N 12.3365°E

Architecture
- Architect: Giuseppe Sardi (facade)
- Type: Church
- Style: Baroque, Renaissance
- Completed: 1663 (facade)

The Church of Santissimo Salvatore (Italian: Chiesa del Santissimo Salvatore, lit. 'Church of the Most Holy Saviour'), usually known by its Venetian name of San Salvador, is a church in Venice, northern Italy. It is located on the Campo San Salvador, along the Mercerie, the main shopping street of Venice. The church was first consecrated in 1177 by Pope Alexander III shortly after his reconciliation with Emperor Frederick Barbarossa at nearby San Marco. The present church, however, was begun in around 1508 by Giorgio Spavento and continued after his death the following year by Tullio Lombardo, Vincenzo Scamozzi and possibly Jacopo Sansovino. They built a large hall church, formed from three Greek crosses placed end to end. Each has a dome with a lantern to let light into the cavernous interior. The facade was added in 1663 by Giuseppe Sardi.

Adjoining the church is the former monastery, now the offices of the telephone company, which still contain Sansovino's magnificent cloisters.

San Salvador is the parish church of a parish in the Vicariate of San Marco-Castello. Other churches in the parish are San Bartolomeo and San Zulian.

San Salvador is a small, but still-active religious, cultural and social centre.

Below the left column on the facade there is a cannonball embedded in the base of the column. It derived from a bombardment in 1849 by Austrian forces in the port of Marghera, of the independent republic which had been proclaimed by Daniele Manin.

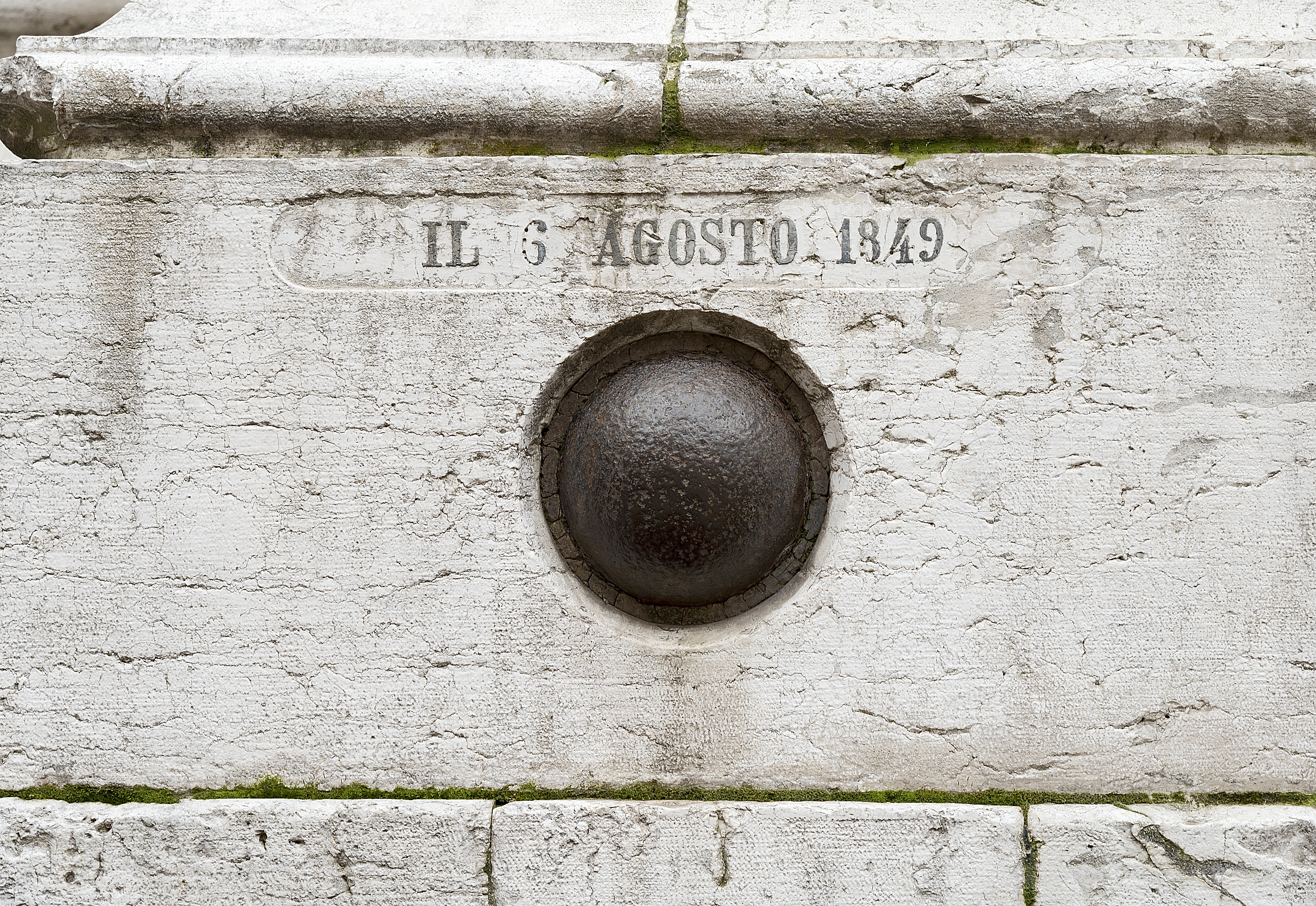
Embedded cannonball in Facade.

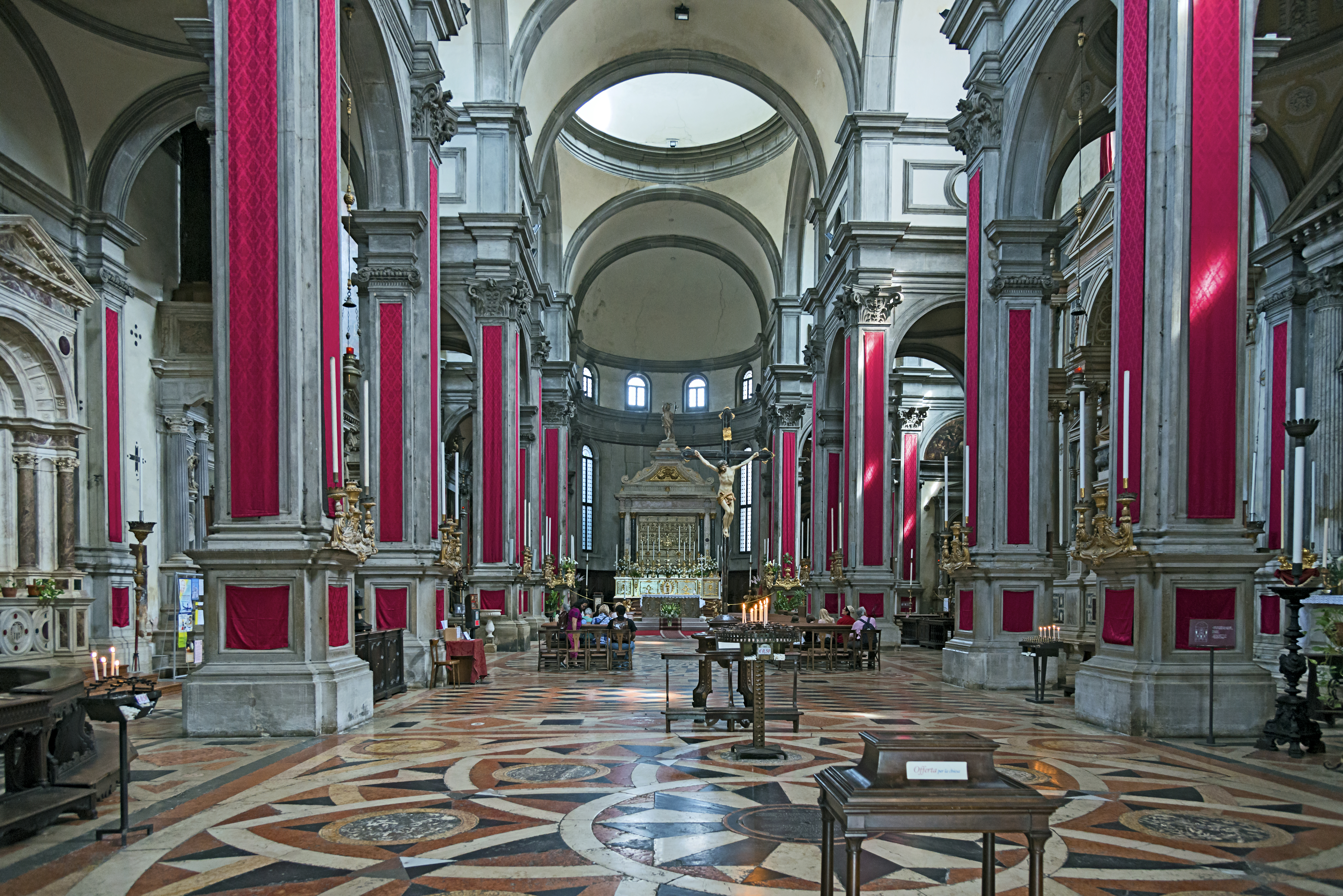
Inside

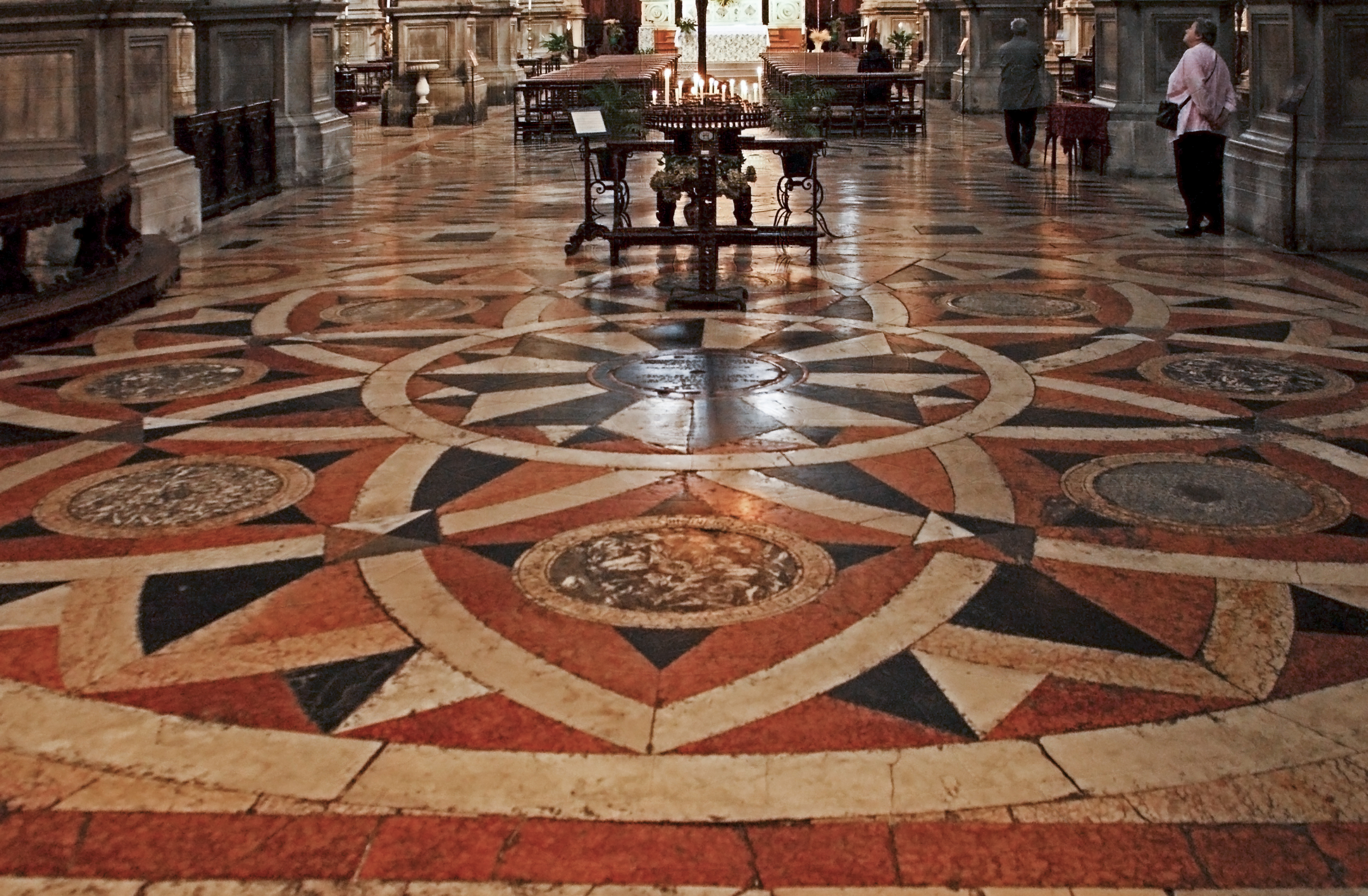
Polychrome marble mosaic

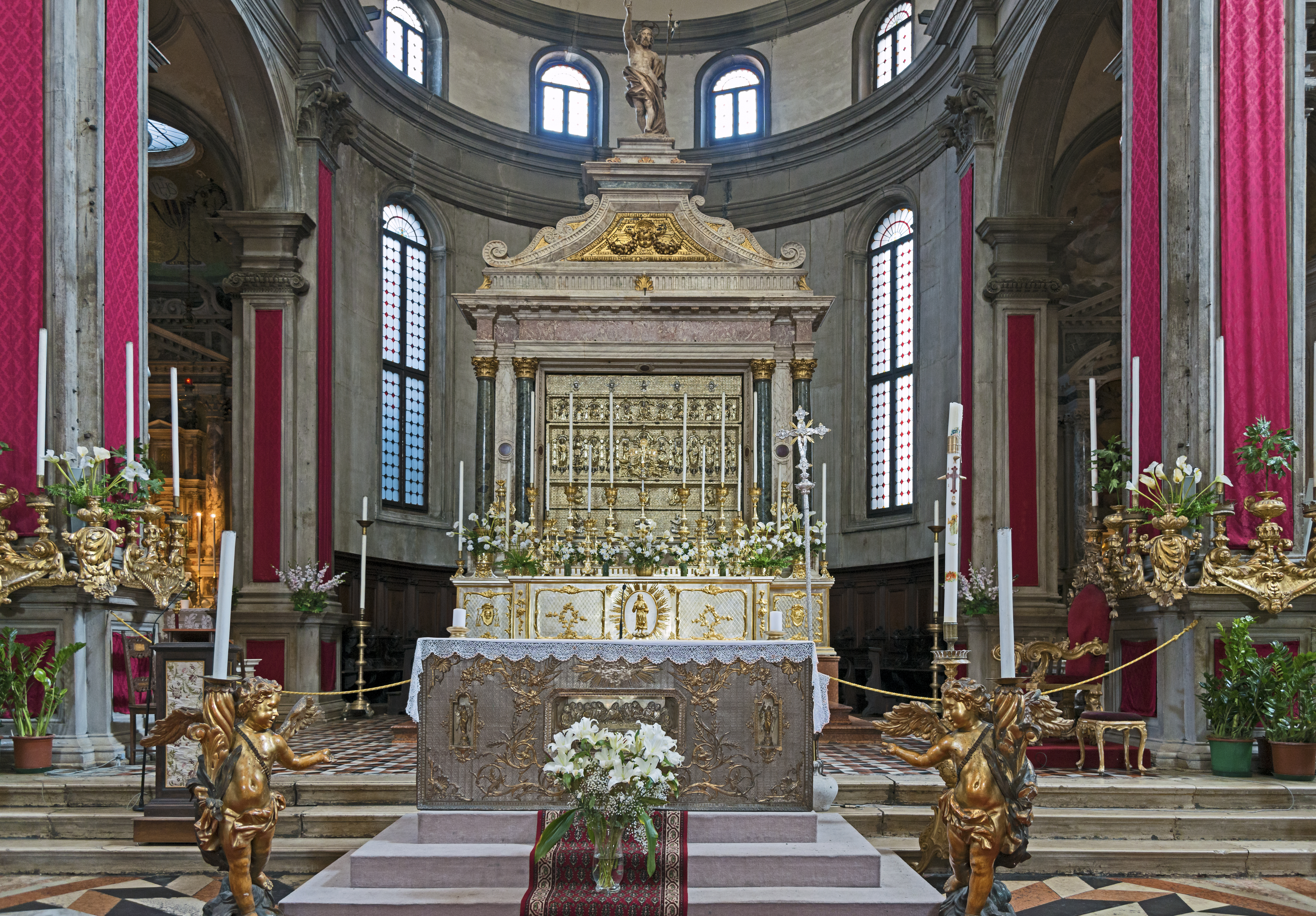
Altarpiece and main altar

== Works of art ==
- Jacopo Sansovino (tomb of Francesco Venier on the south wall).
- Titian (Annunciation on the south wall and Transfiguration, the altarpiece of the high altar).
- Francesco Vecellio (paintings on organ doors; frescoes in tomb in floor in front of high altar).
- Alessandro Vittoria (altar on north wall, with statues of St. Roch and St. Sebastian).
- Giulio Angolo del Moro Savior in Monument of Andrea Dolfin.
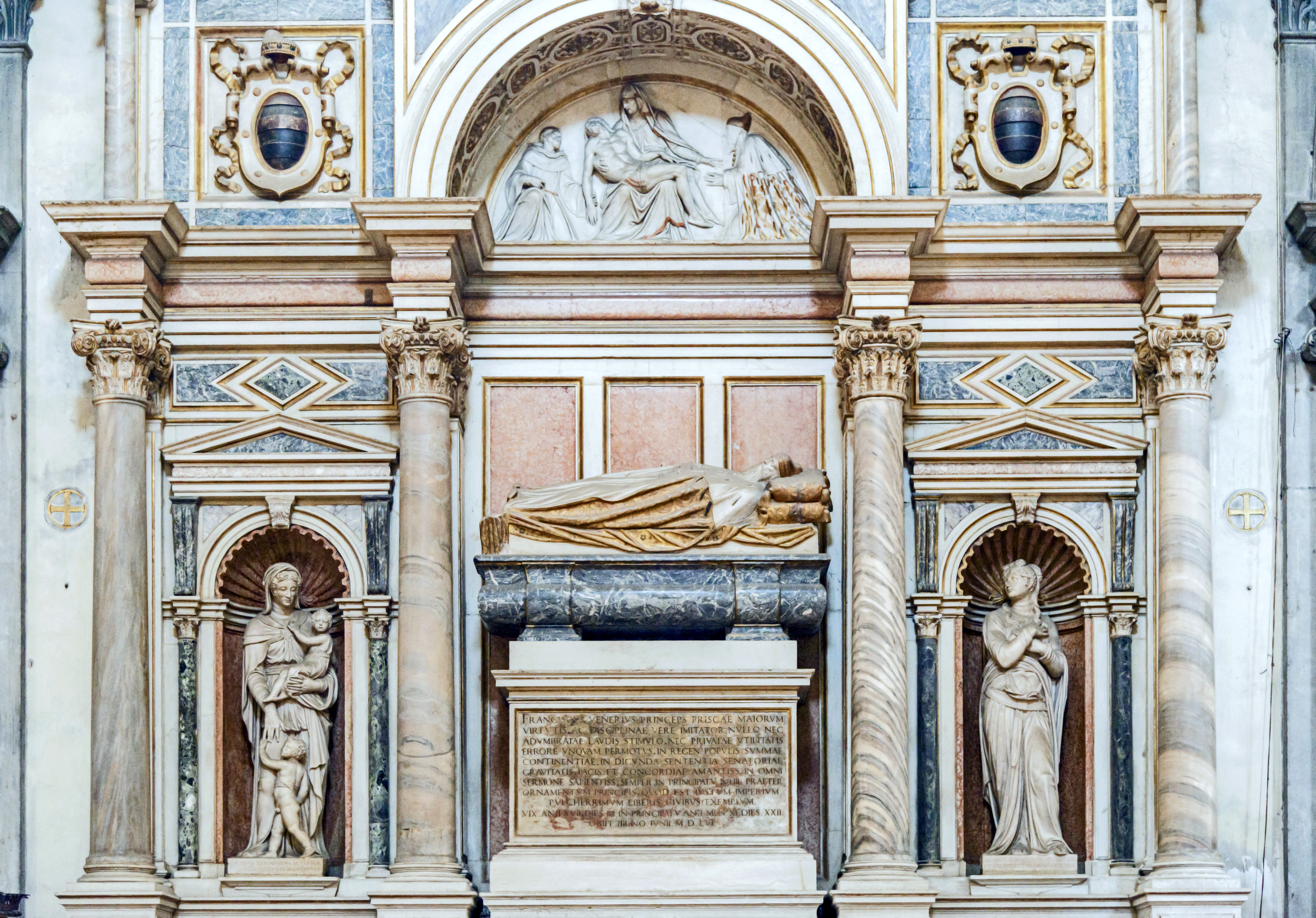
Francesco Venier's monument

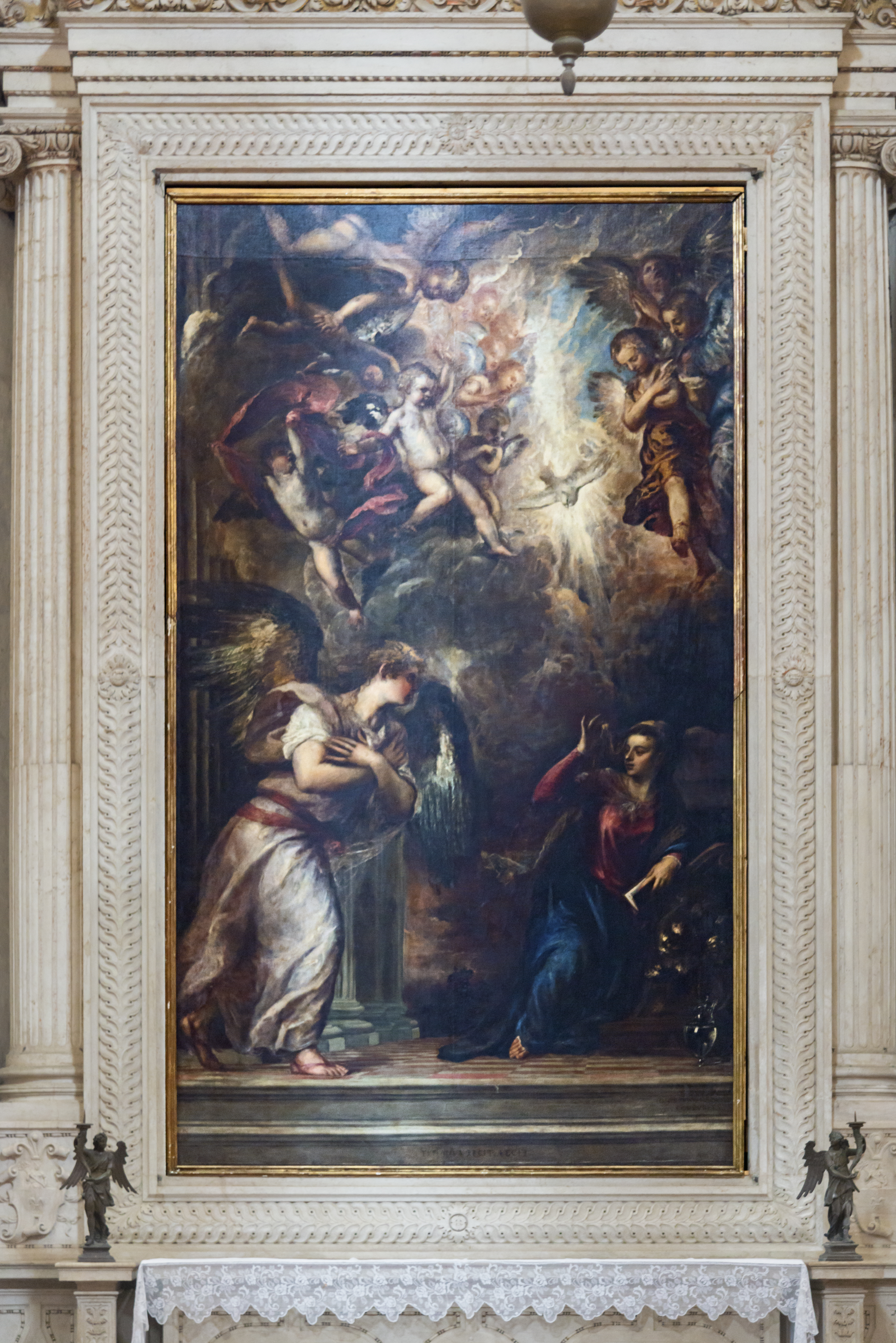
Titian (Annunciation

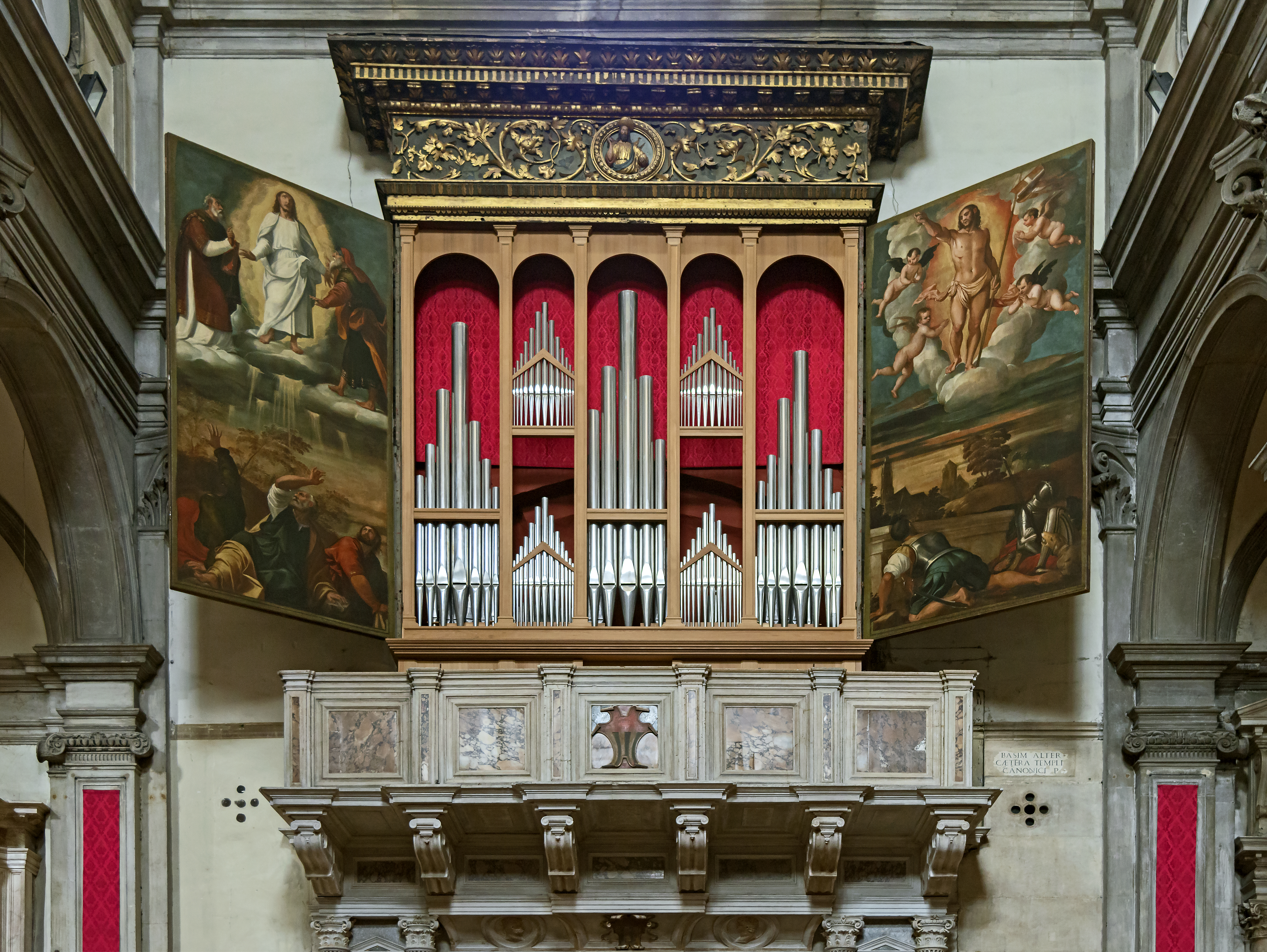
Organ

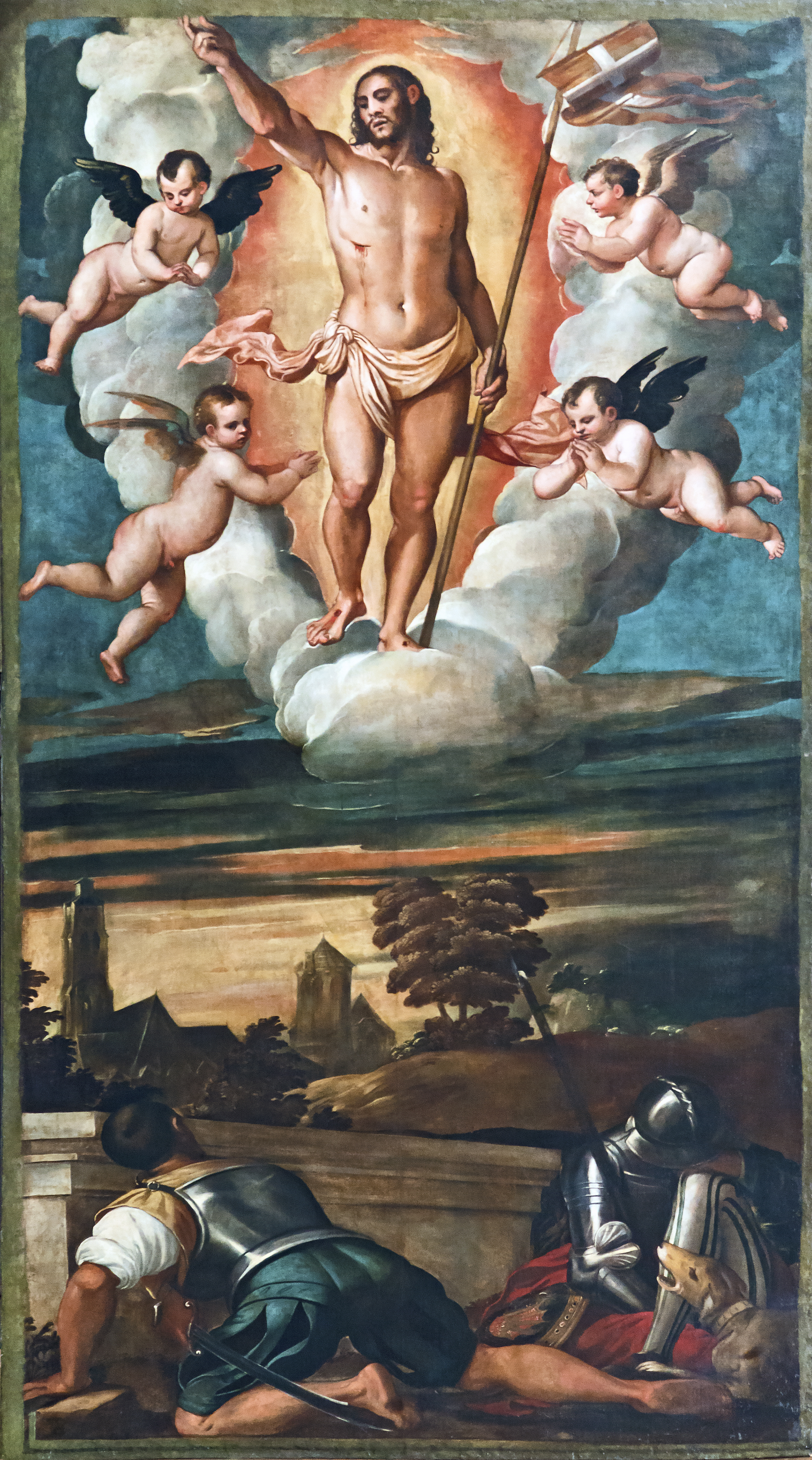
Resurrection by Francesco Vecellio

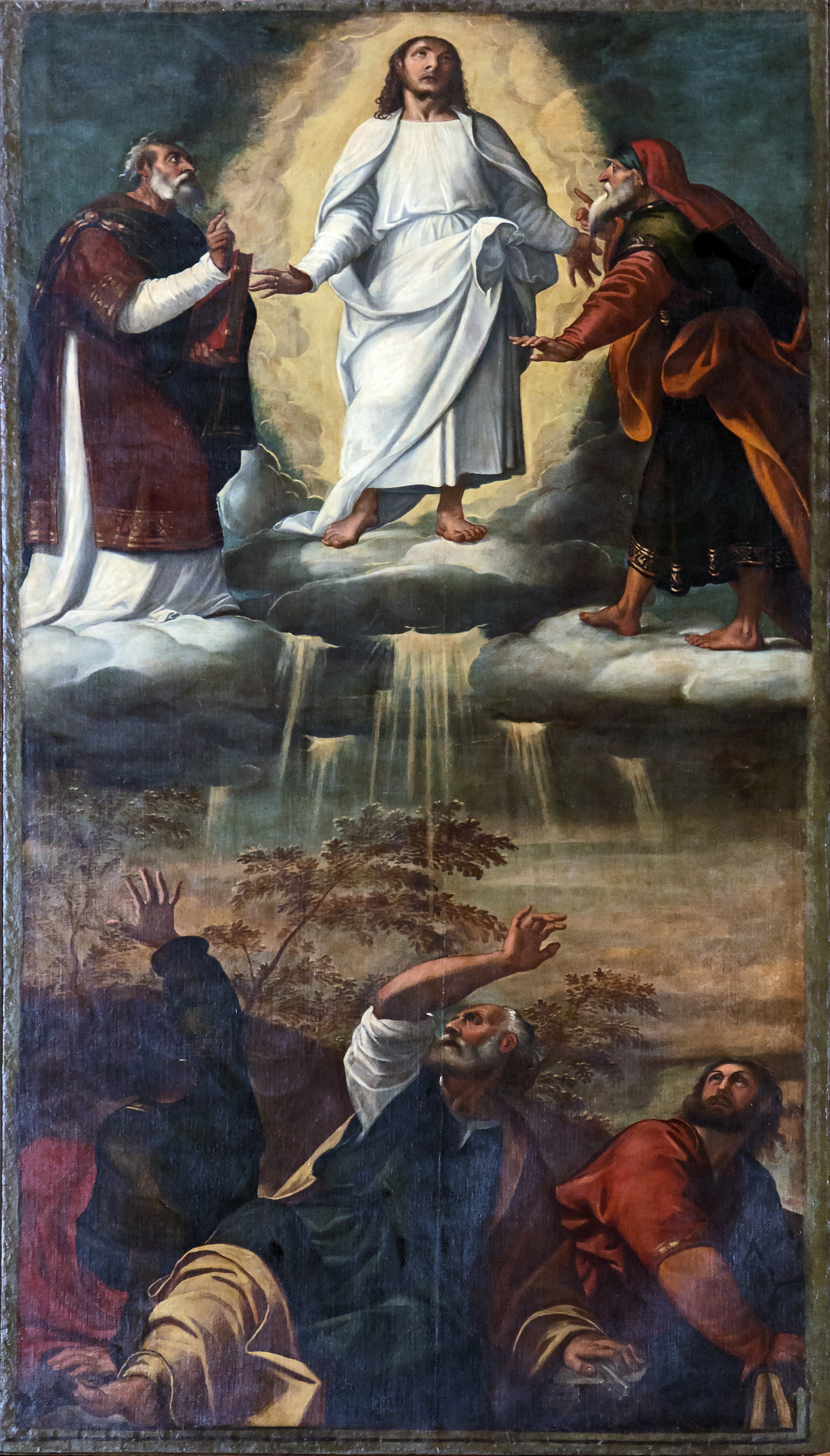
Transfiguration by Francesco Vecellio

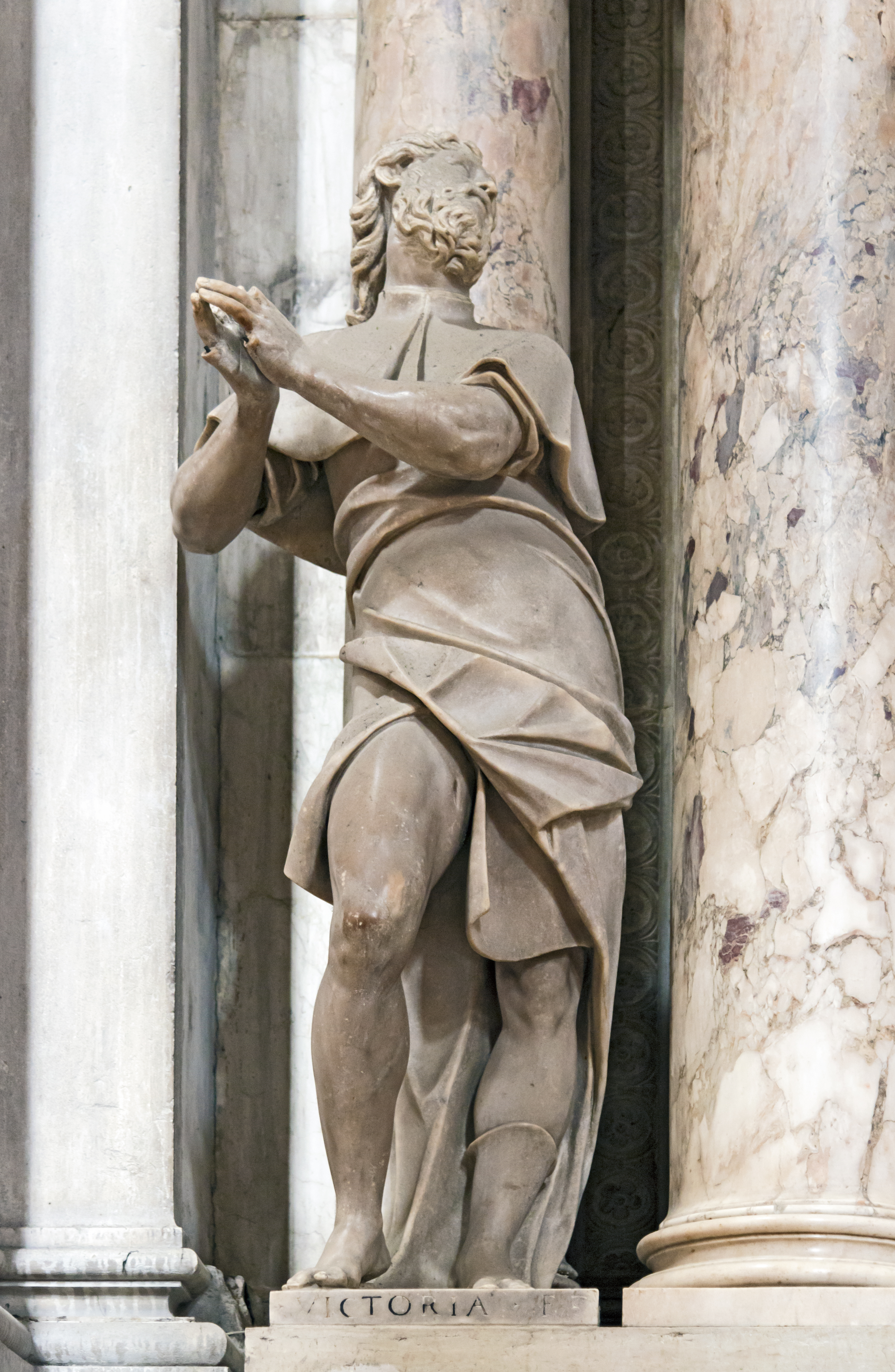
St. Roch by Alessandro Vittoria

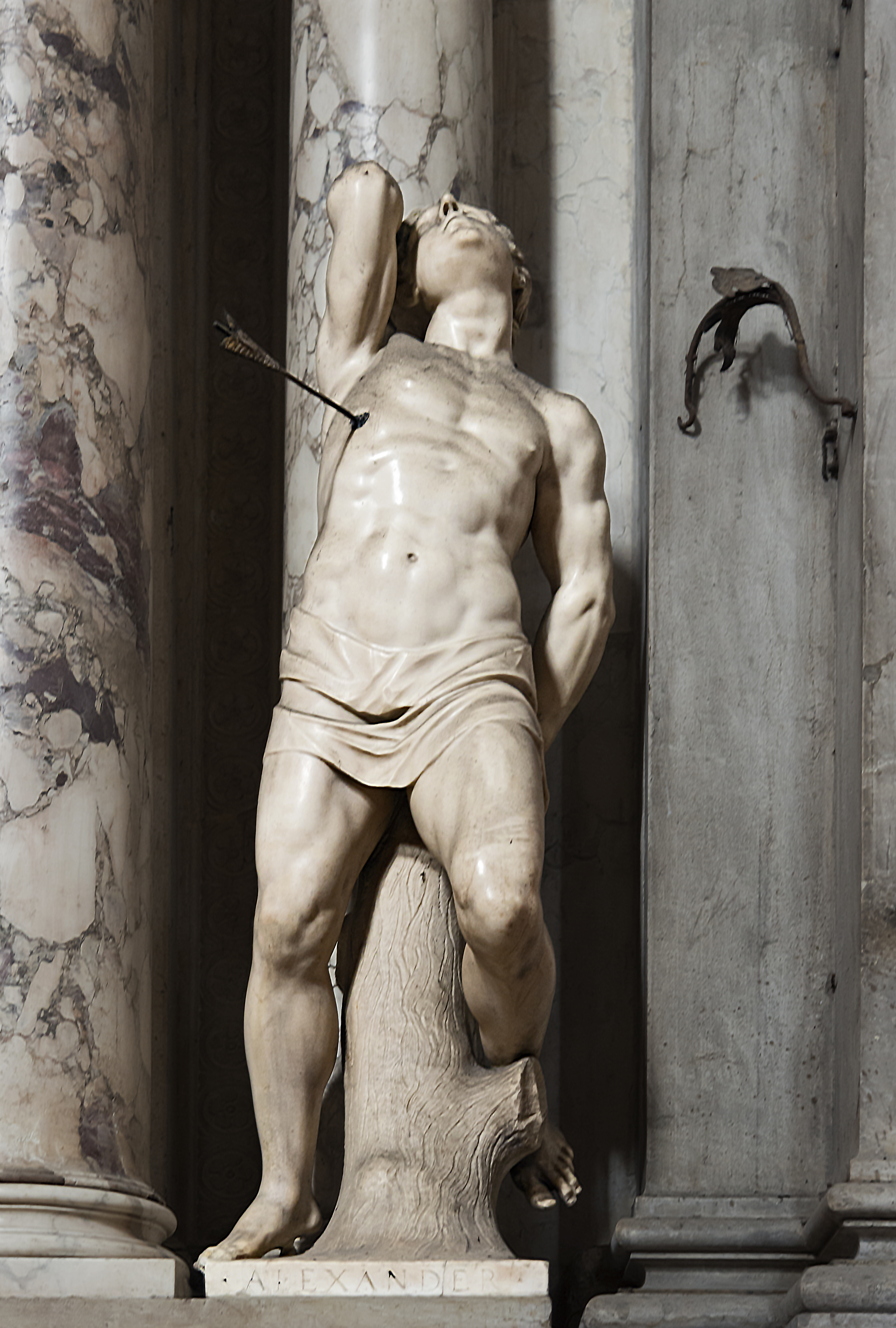
St. Sebastian by Alessandro Vittoria

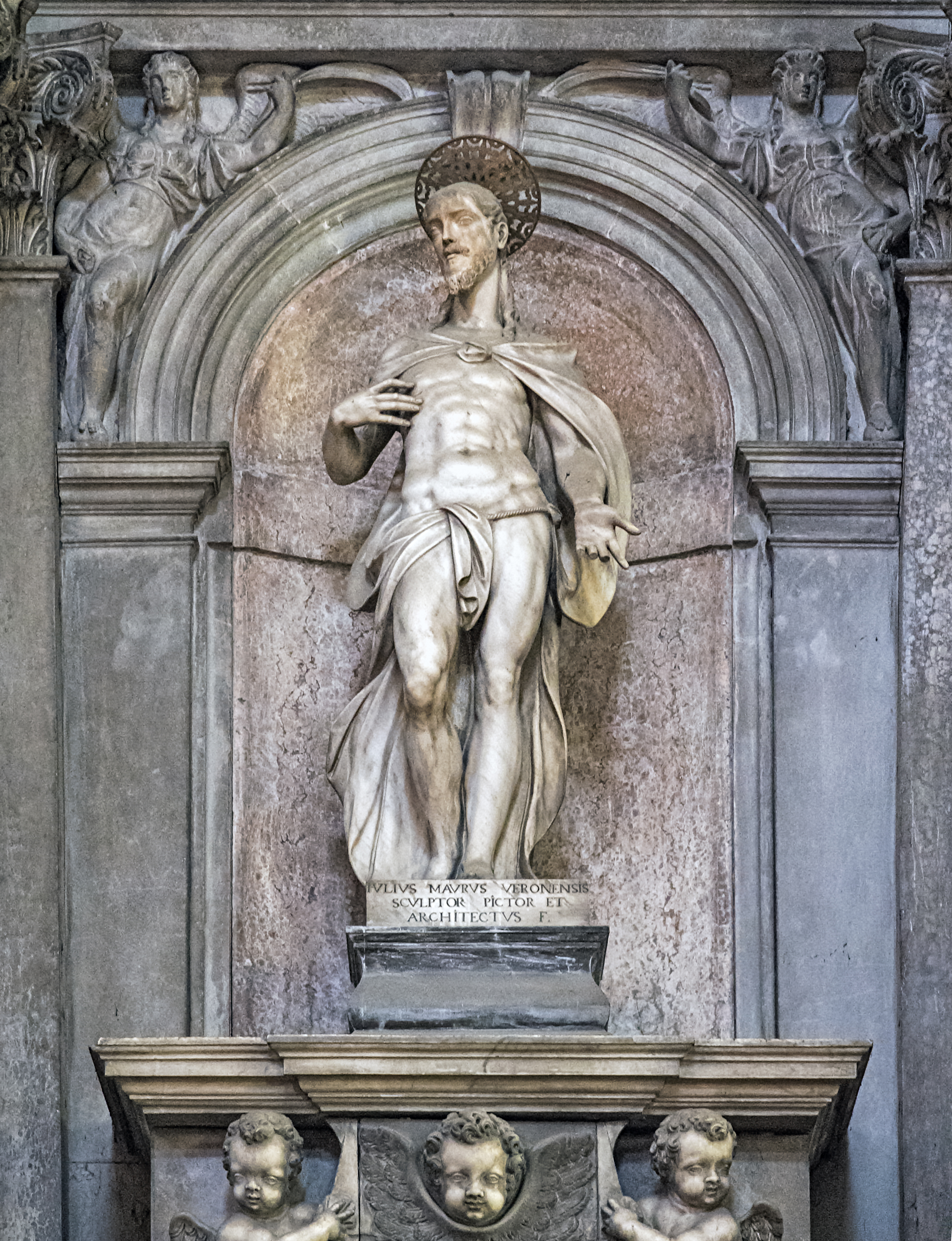
Savior by Giulio del Moro

== Funerary monuments ==
- Caterina Cornaro, Queen of the Kingdom of Cyprus (d.1510)
- Andrea Dolfin
- Doge Gerolamo Priuli
- Doge Lorenzo Priuli
- Doge Francesco Venier (d.1556)

== See also ==
- 16th-century Western domes
