= Madonna and Child with Saint Catherine and Saint Nicholas =

Painting by Cima da Conegliano

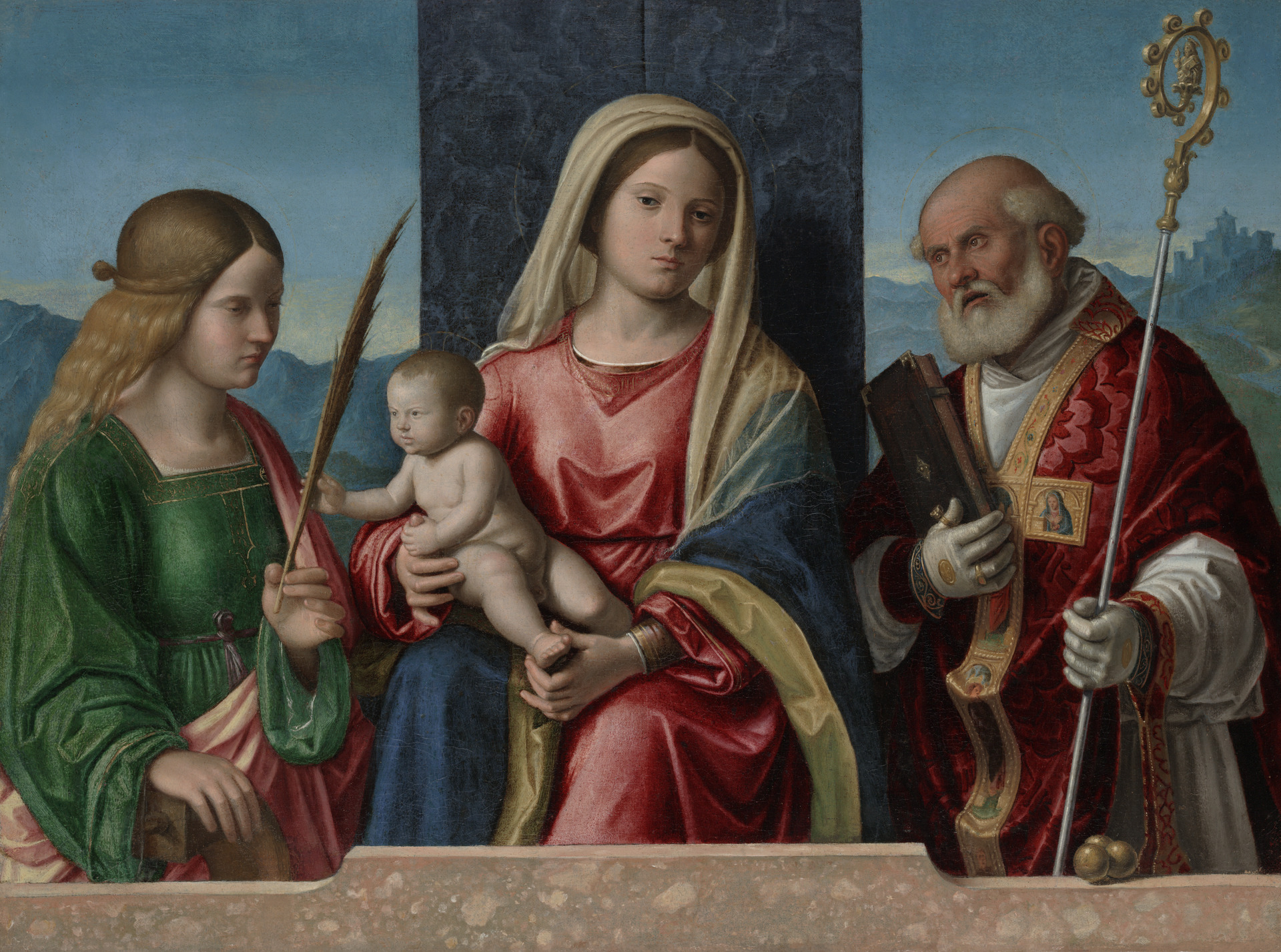
Madonna and Child with Saint Catherine and Saint Nicholas (1510-1517) by Cima da Conegliano

Madonna and Child with Saint Catherine and Saint Nicholas is a 1510-1517 oil on canvas painting by Cima da Conegliano, now on long-term loan to the Yale University Art Gallery from the Barker Welfare Foundation in memory of Catherine Barker and Charles V. Hickox.
