= Madonna and Child with Saint Jerome and Saint Mary Magdalene =

Painting by Cima da Conegliano

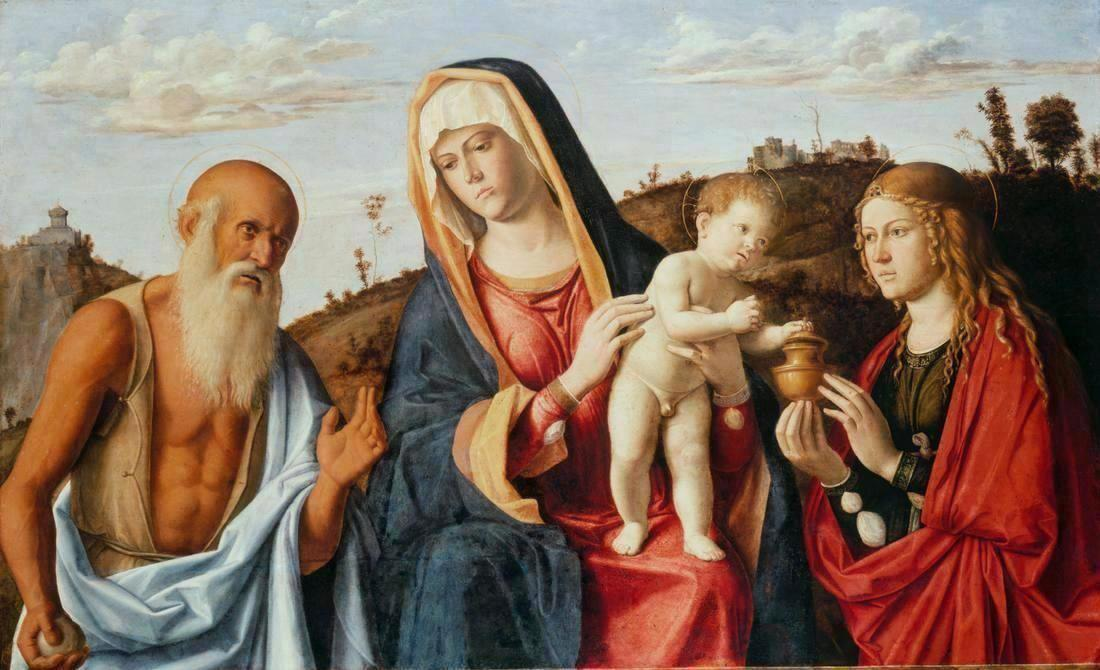
Madonna and Child with Saint Jerome and Saint Mary Magdalene (1495) by Cima da Conegliano

Madonna and Child with Saint Jerome and Saint Mary Magdalene is a 1495 oil-on-panel painting by the Italian Renaissance painter Cima da Conegliano, now in the Alte Pinakothek, Munich, having been bought for the Bavarian royal collections in 1815 from the Empress Josephine's collection at Malmaison.
