= Virgin and Child (Cima, London, c. 1505) =

Painting by Cima da Conegliano

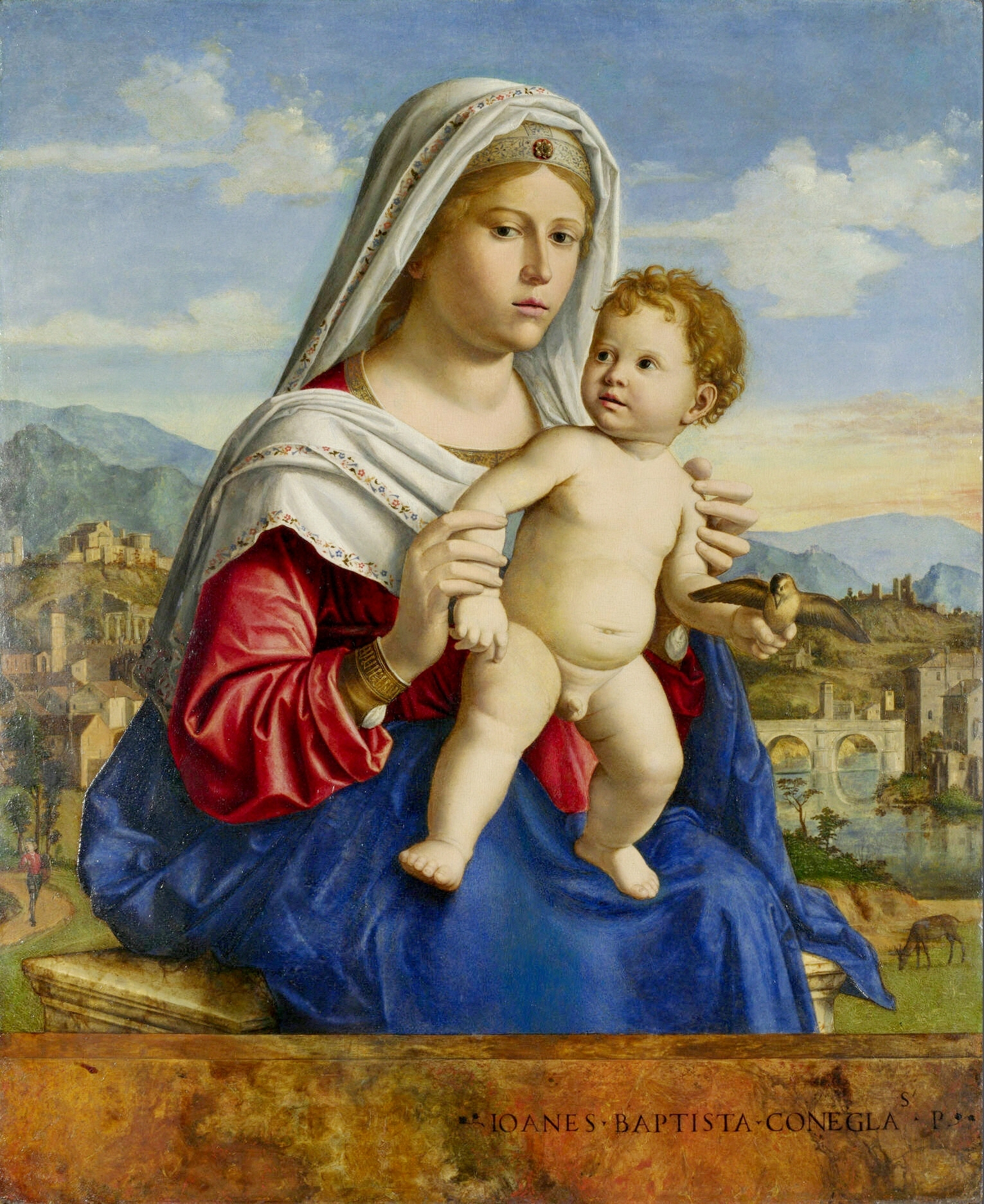
- Artist: Cima da Conegliano
- Completion date: 1505
- Dimensions: 53.3 x 43.8 cm
- Location: National Gallery, London

The Virgin and Child is a 1505 oil on panel painting by Cima da Conegliano, now in the National Gallery, London, which bought it in 1860.
