= Virgin and Child with Saint Andrew and Saint Peter =

Painting by Cima da Conegliano

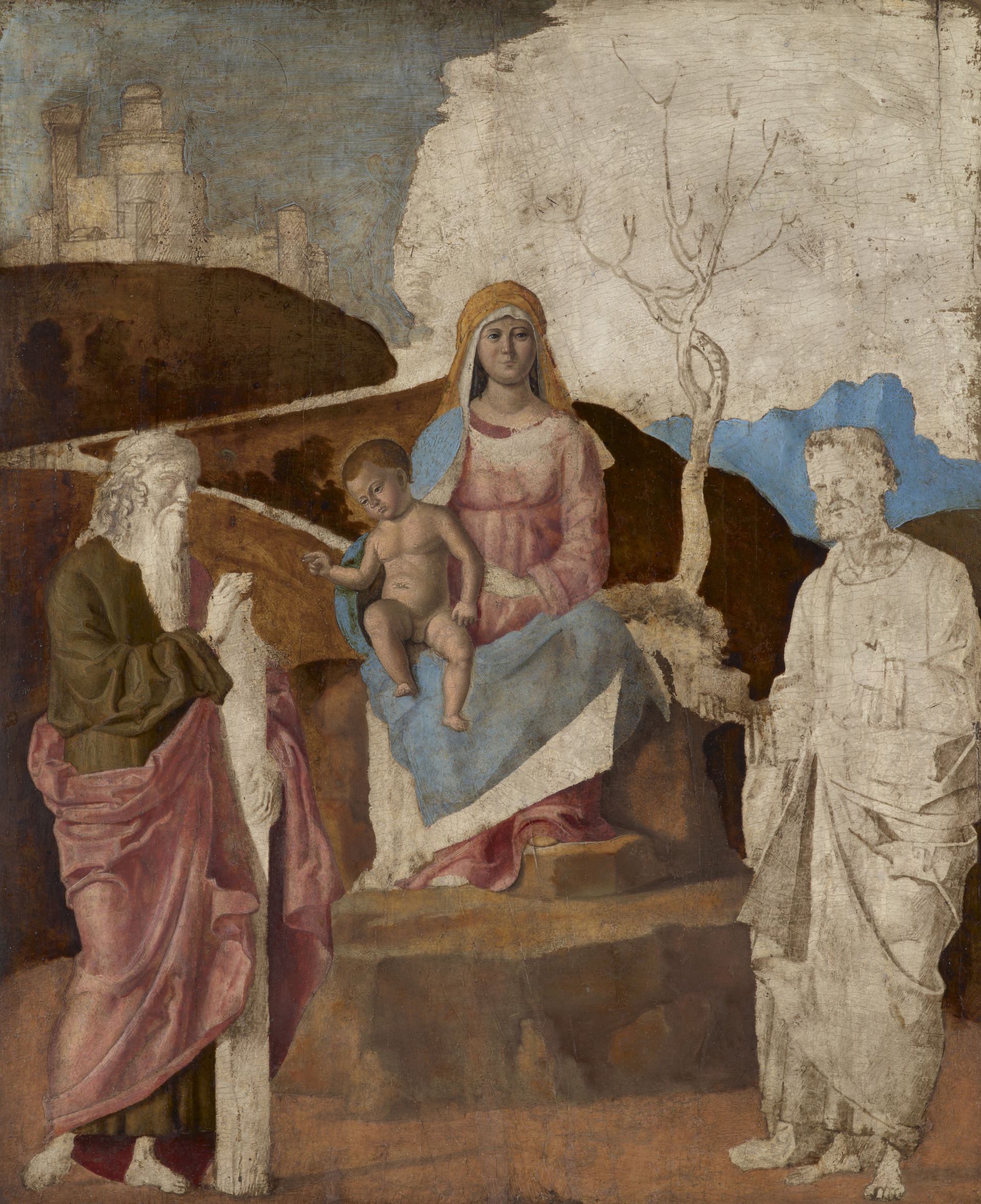
The Virgin and Child with Saint Andrew and Saint Peter (c. 1510) by Cima da Conegliano

The Virgin and Child with Saint Andrew and Saint Peter is an unfinished painting by an unknown artist in the studio of Cima da Conegliano. It is believed to have been created in the late 15th or early 16th century. It is now in the National Galleries of Scotland, in Edinburgh.
