= Virgin and Child before a Landscape =

Painting by Cima da Conegliano

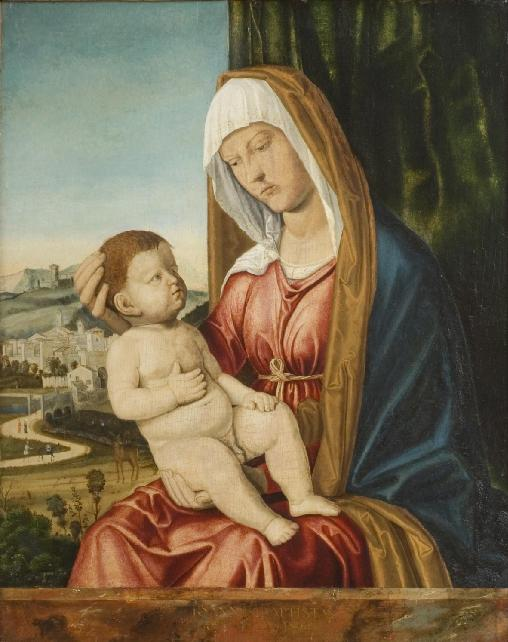
Virgin and Child before a Landscape by Cima da Conegliano

Virgin and Child before a Landscape is an undated oil-on-panel painting by the Italian Renaissance artist Cima da Conegliano, now in the Philadelphia Museum of Art, which acquired it as part of the John G. Johnson collection in 1917.
