= Saints Peter, Martha, Mary Magdalen and Leonard =

1514 painting by Antonio da Correggio

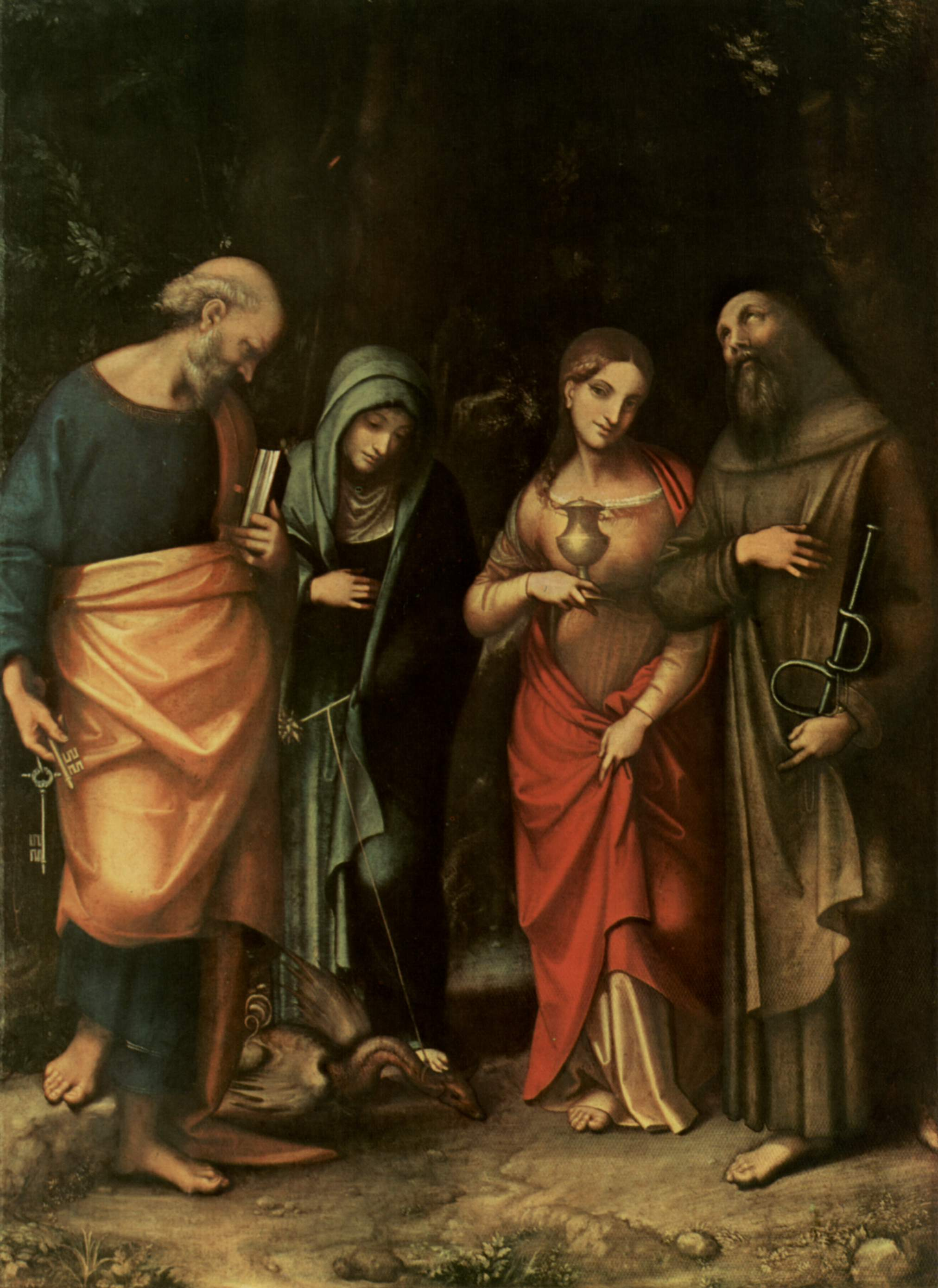
Four Saints

Saints Peter, Martha, Mary Magdalen and Leonard or Four Saints is a 1514 oil on canvas altarpiece by Correggio, now in the Metropolitan Museum of Art in New York City. He painted it for the church of Santa Maria della Misericordia and it shows Saint Peter, Saint Martha, Mary Magdalene and Leonard of Noblac.

== History ==
It has been linked to the 17 December 1517 will of the notary Melchiorre Fassi, which made the Church of San Quirino in Correggio his heir, on condition that it build a chapel with an altar dedicated to the four saints shown in the work. However, it is unclear if the work already existed, or if it was painted especially for the chapel. A codicil was added on 29 August 1528, changing the heir to the Church of San Domenico in the same town, with the same condition. On 1 April 1538, he added a third and final codicil switching the church of that of Santa Maria della Misericordia, where he also wished to be buried, and where he already possessed a chapel (dedicated to Saint Martha) which had an altarpiece at the time he first wrote his will. It is unclear if Correggio painted the work after the first will of 1517 or, as is more probable, before it.

== Analysis ==
The artist carefully studied how to vary poses, gestures and looks, with two of the figures looking downwards (Peter and Martha), one looking up (Leonard) and one towards the viewer (Mary Magdalene). The slight smile of Mary also draws on the style of Leonardo da Vinci, most notably in the Mona Lisa. Stylistically it can be placed in the years before 1517, preceding the maturer Madonna and Child with St Francis. Parallels with Raphael's The Ecstasy of St. Cecilia, which arrived in Bologna in 1514–15, should also be considered with caution. The simple and compact composition instead has precedents in other local artists such as Saints Roch, Anthony Abbot and Lucy by Cima da Conegliano, which was already in Parma and belongs to an artistic tradition more familiar to Correggio.

== Bibliography ==
- Cecil Gould, The Paintings of Correggio, London 1976, ISBN 0-571-10580-7.
- (in Italian) Elio Monducci, Il Correggio. La vita e le opere nelle fonti documentarie, Cinisello Balsamo 2004, ISBN 88-8215-805-5.
- Arthur Ewart Popham, Correggio's Drawings, London 1957.
- (in Italian) Corrado Ricci, Correggio, Roma 1930.
