= Virgin and Child with Saint Paul and Saint Francis =

Painting after Cima da Conegliano

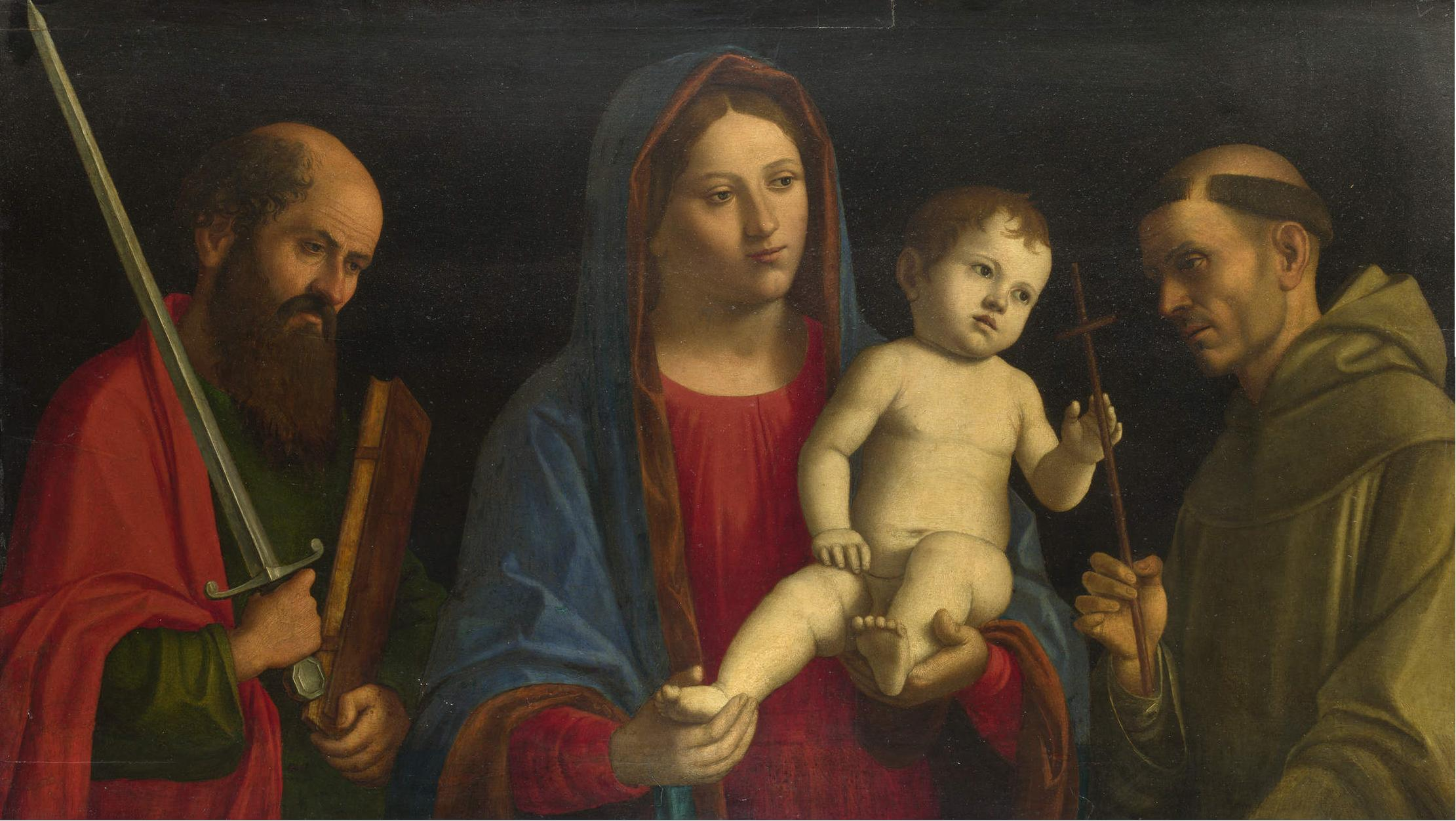
The Virgin and Child with Saint Paul and Saint Francis (c. 1508-1530)

The Virgin and Child with Saint Paul and Saint Francis is a 1508-1530 oil on poplar panel. It was previously attributed to Cima da Conegliano but now thought to be by one of his studio assistants, possibly using workshop drawings by the artist himself, since all four figures appear in autograph works by the painter. It is now in the National Gallery, London.
