= Madonna and Child with Saint Francis and Saint Clare =

Painting by Cima da Conegliano

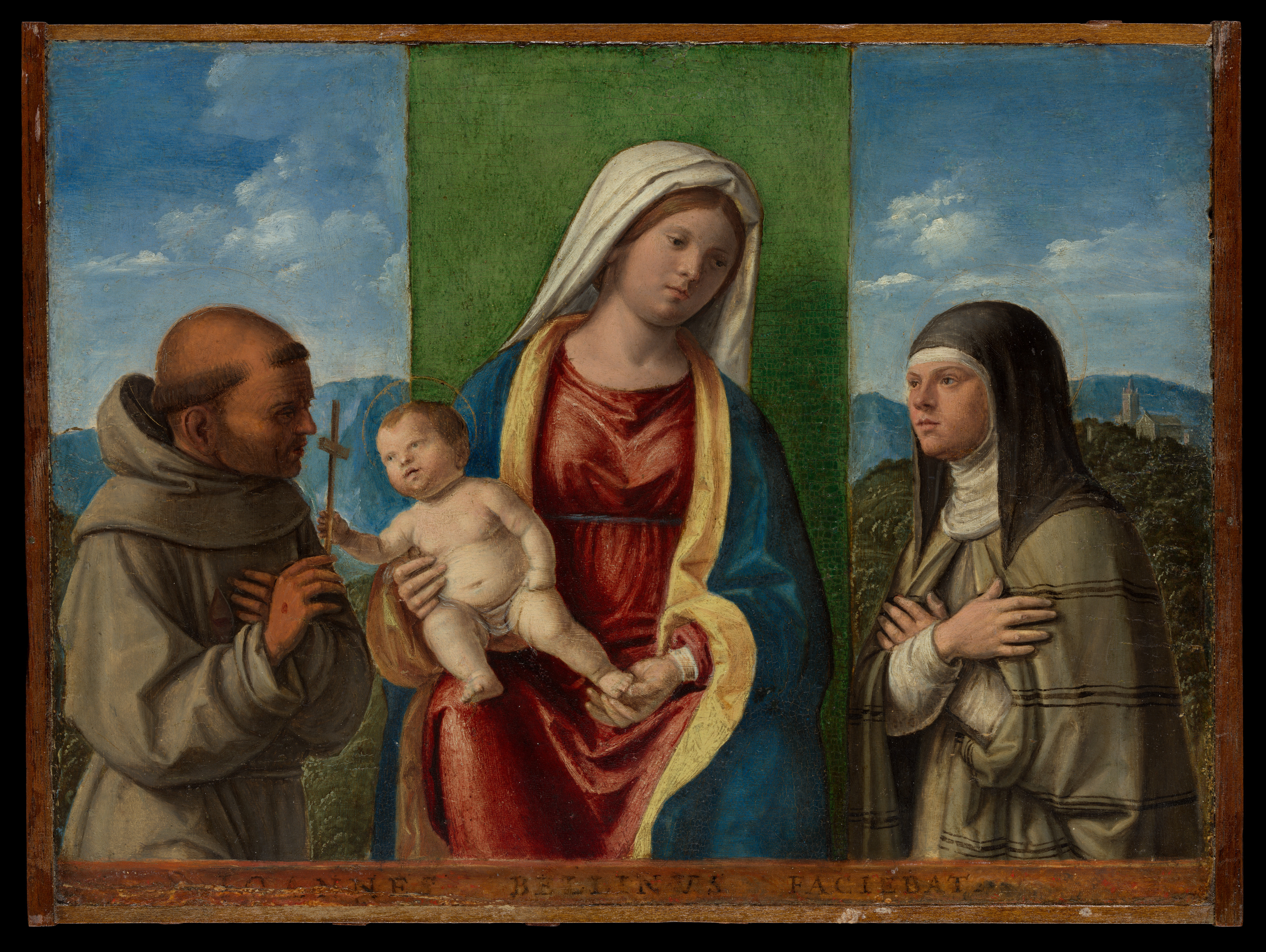
Madonna and Child with Saint Francis and Saint Clare (1492–1495) by Cima da Conegliano

Madonna and Child with Saint Francis and Saint Clare is an oil-on-panel painting created ca. 1492–1495 by the Italian Renaissance painter Cima da Conegliano, now in the Metropolitan Museum of Art, in New York.
