= Madonna of the Orange Tree =

Painting by Cima da Conegliano

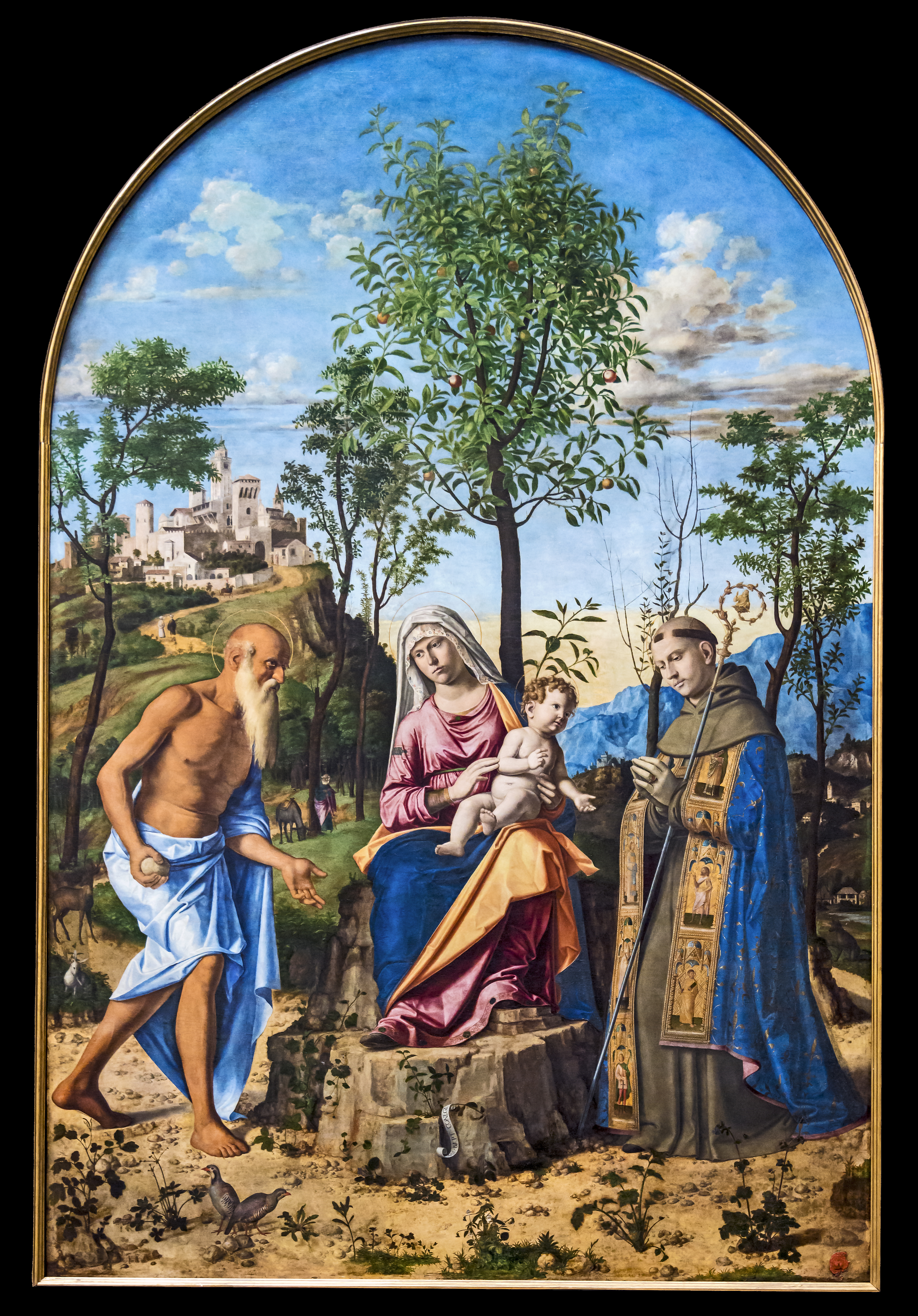
Madonna of the Orange Tree (1496–1498) by Cima da Conegliano

Madonna of the Orange Tree (Italian - Madonna dell'Arancio) is a 1496–1498 oil painting on panel by Cima da Conegliano. It was originally produced for the church of Santa Chiara in Murano, from which it was confiscated for the Gallerie dell'Accademia in Venice, where it now hangs.

== Gallery ==
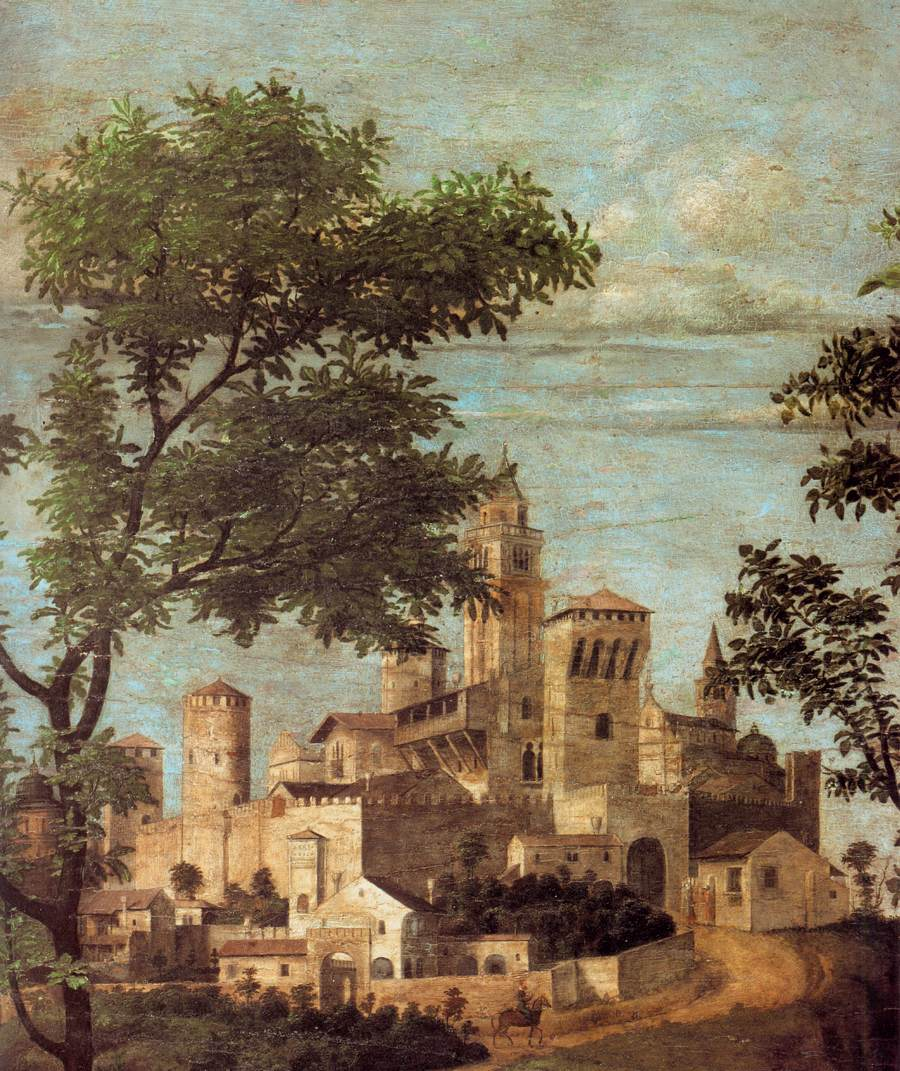
Landscape

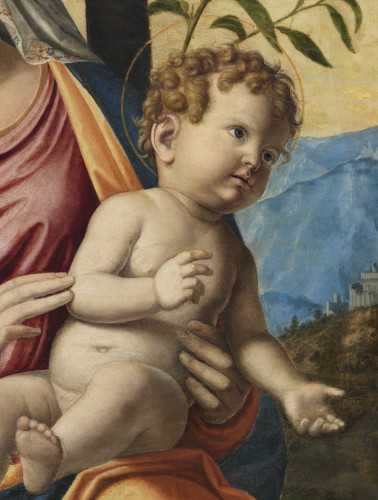
Christ Child

== Bibliography ==
- (in Italian) Stefano Zuffi, Il Quattrocento, Electa, Milano 2004. ISBN 8837023154
- (in Italian) Ugo Carmeni, "Madonna dell'arancio, un'analisi alla rovescia", Venezia, 2010, (consultazione online)
