= Bacchic Cassone =

Painting by Cima da Conegliano

The Bacchic Cassone was a 1505–1510 panel painting by Cima da Conegliano, produced as the front panel of a decorated cassone. It is now split into four portions, one in a private collection, two in the Philadelphia Museum of Art (Bacchant and Drunken Silenus) and one in the Museo Poldi Pezzoli in Milan (Marriage of Bacchus and Ariadne).

== Gallery ==
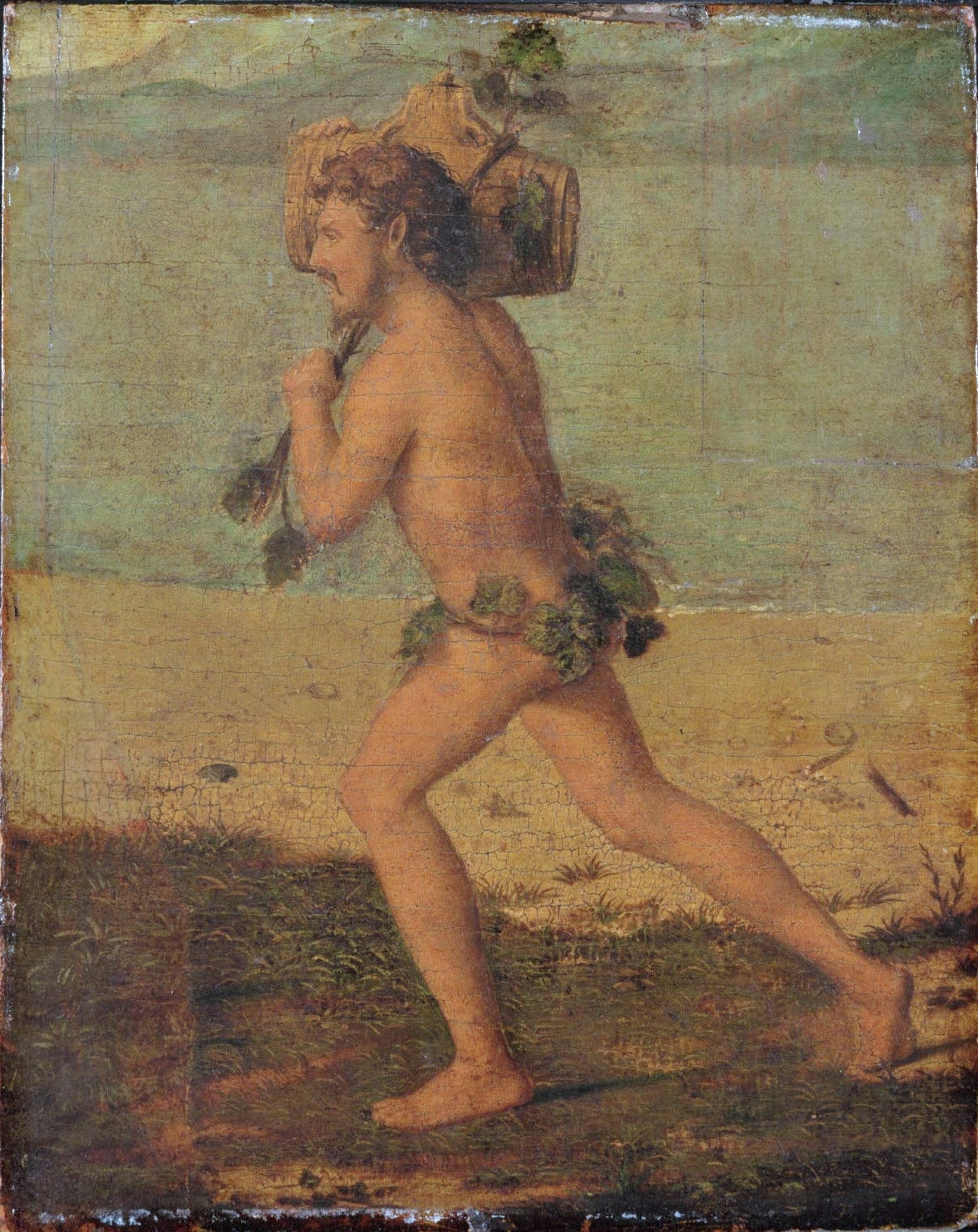
Bacchante

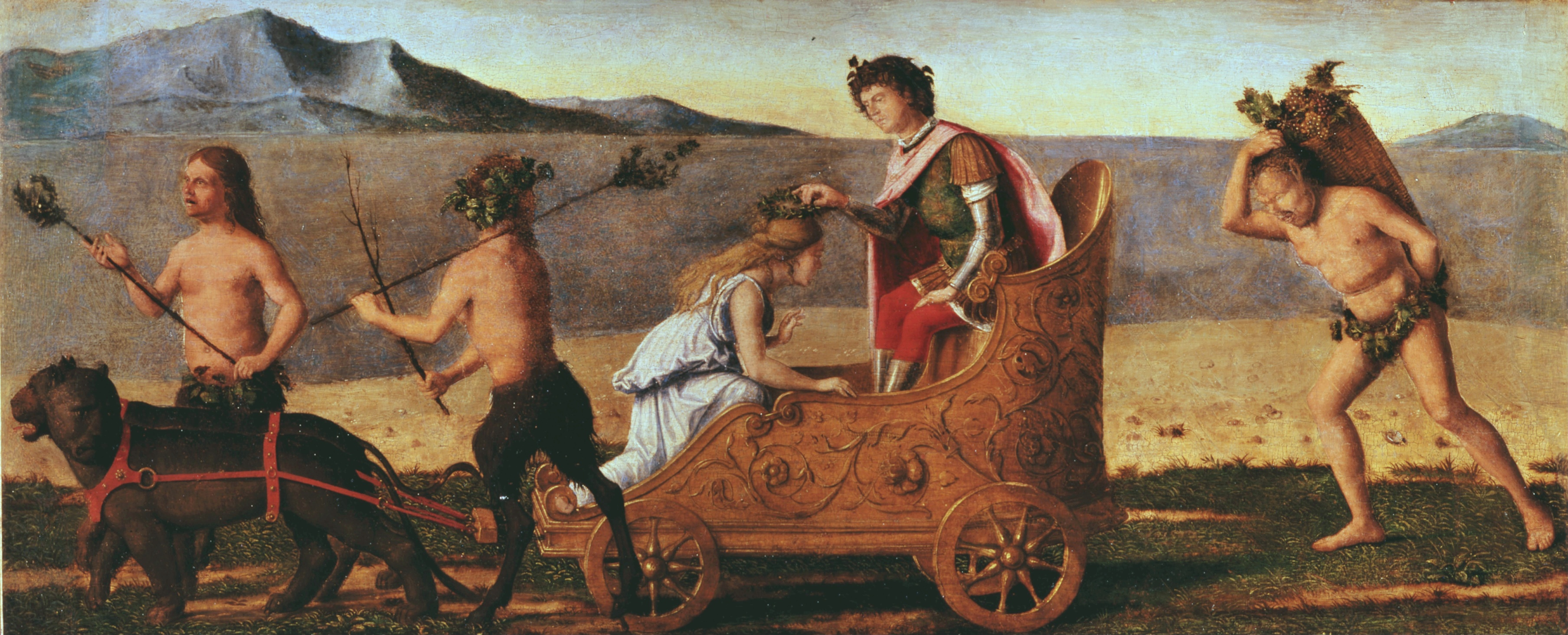
Marriage of Bacchus and Ariadne

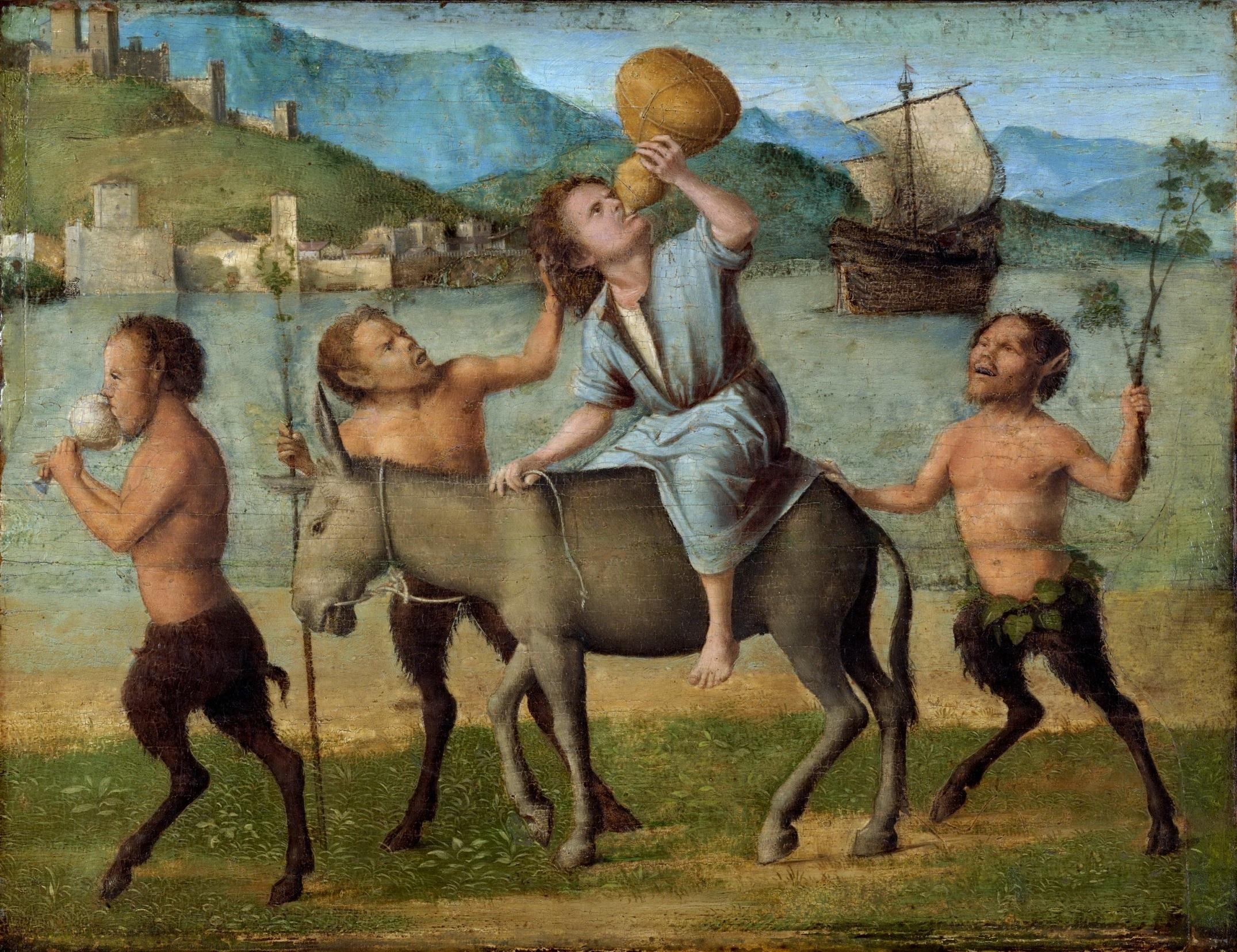
Satyrs with Silenus
