= Baptism of Christ (Cima) =

Painting by Cima da Conegliano

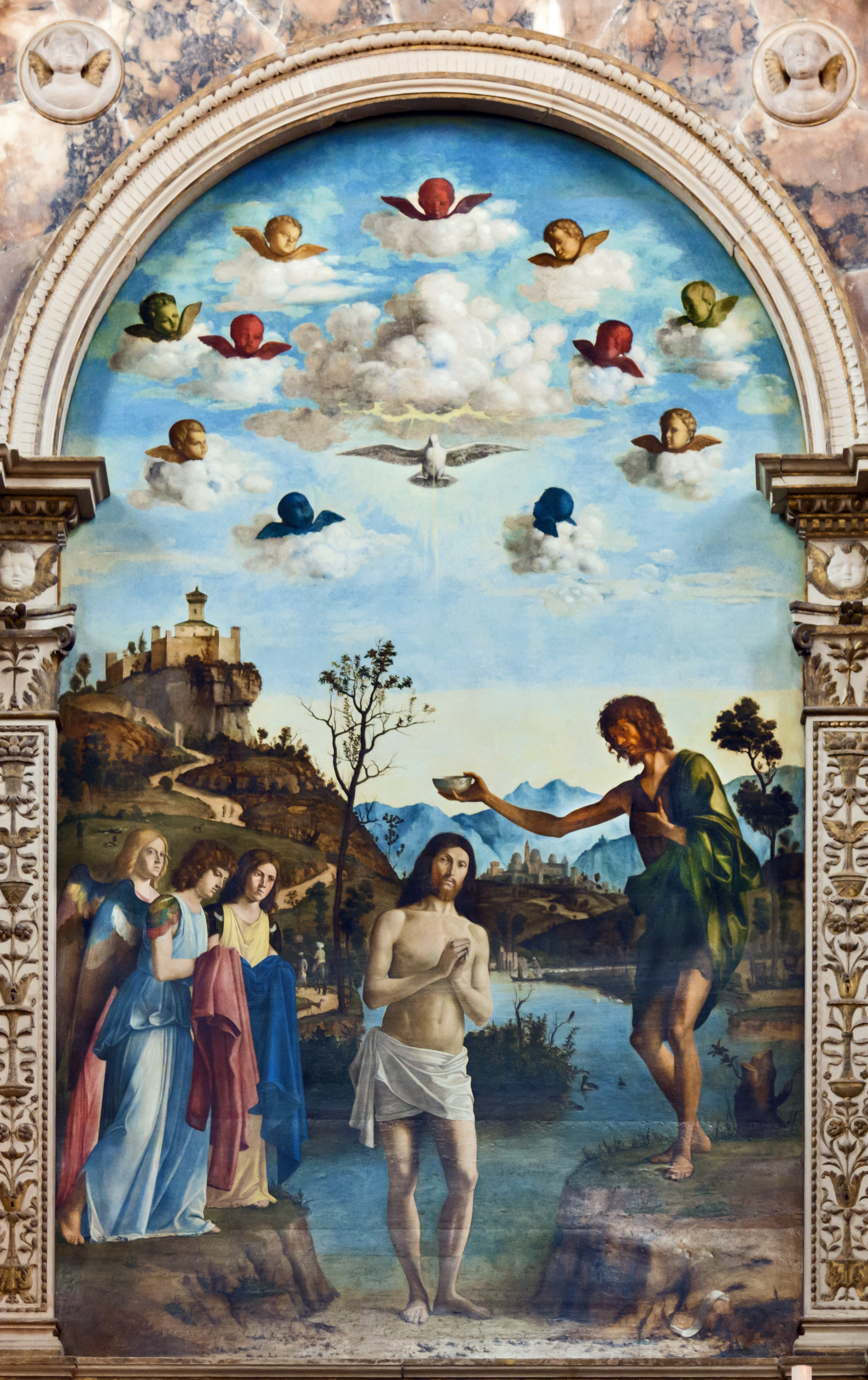
- Artist: Cima da Conegliano
- Year: 1492
- Medium: Oil on panel
- Dimensions: 350 cm × 210 cm (140 in × 83 in)
- Location: San Giovanni in Bragora, Venice

Baptism of Christ is a painting by Italian Renaissance painter Cima da Conegliano, dating from 1492. It is an oil painting on panel and is housed in the church of San Giovanni in Bragora in Venice.

== Description ==
The painting portrays Christ at the center of the scene, standing with joined hands. His attitude is that of humble submission to baptism, which is being given him by Saint John the Baptist, who appears on the right.

At the left are three angels with Christ's garments, in red and blue colors, which he will use after the baptism. The scene is completed by an angelic choir surrounding a dove representing the Holy Spirit in the sky, and a generic city on a spur on the left, while another one is visible in the far background.

This backdrop is a portrayal of the foothills (outside of the Italian Dolomites) where Cima is from, showing how individual artistic expression was beginning to be allowed in the Renaissance. The trees behind Christ and Saint John the Baptist bend around the two figures. St John the Baptist's tree is healthy and alive, while Christ's tree is entering spring (an era of regrowth), alluding to his resurrection and rebirth.

== Placement inside Chapel ==
The altarpiece was originally lower on wall of the chapel. The chapel's original choir screen acted as a frame for the altarpiece, similarly as the choir screen does in Santa Maria Gloriosa Dei Frari for Titian's Assumption of the Virgin (Assunta). Once the choir screen was removed, the altarpiece was moved higher on the wall.
