= Madonna and Child with Saints Michael the Archangel and Andrew =

Painting by Cima da Conegliano

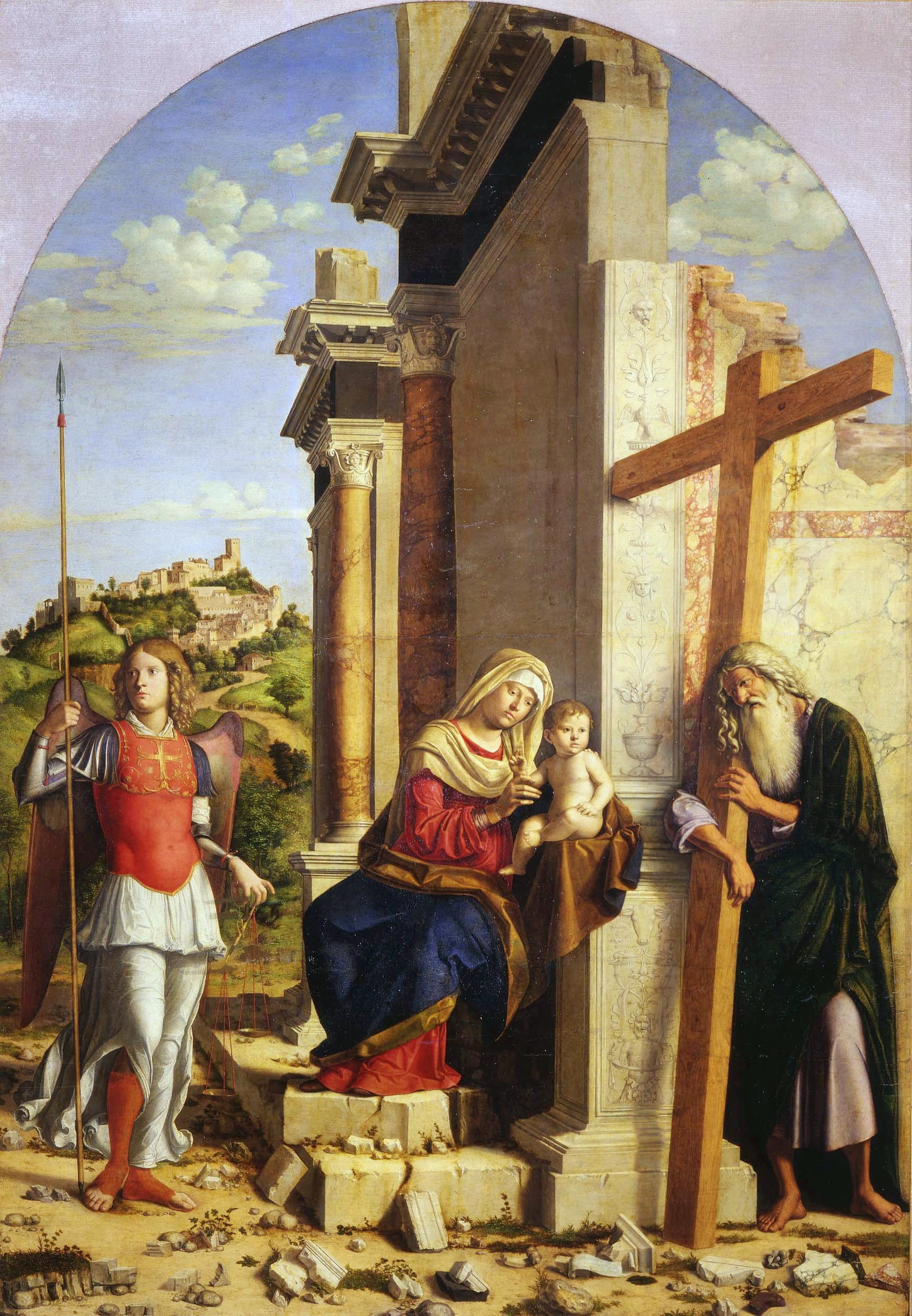
- Artist: Cima da Conegliano
- Year: c. 1496–1498
- Medium: Oil on wood
- Dimensions: 194 cm × 134 cm (76 in × 53 in)
- Location: Galleria nazionale di Parma

The Madonna and Child with Saints Michael the Archangel and Andrew is an oil painting on panel by Cima da Conegliano, measuring 194x134 cm and dating to c. 1496–1498, in the Galleria nazionale di Parma.

== History ==
The painting was originally installed in the old church of the Annunciation outside the city walls of Parma; this was demolished in 1546. In 1706, the painting entered the Sanvital collection as a work attributed to Leonardo da Vinci owing to an apocryphal inscription in the bottom cartouche. In 1834 it was sold to the Ducal Gallery of Parma and it was subsequently attributed to Cima da Conegliano.

== Description ==
The panel represents the Virgin with the Christ Child. On the left, the Archangel Michael stands with a lance and on the right, Andrew the Apostle carries a cross. The background depicts the town of Collalto. At right, ruined marble architecture is seen in silhouette, with pilasters sculpted in classical motifs forming the background of the Virgin and Child. The novel composition accentuates the dynamism of the scene, which is depicted with sharp definition in the details and landscape, all in a soft, golden light.

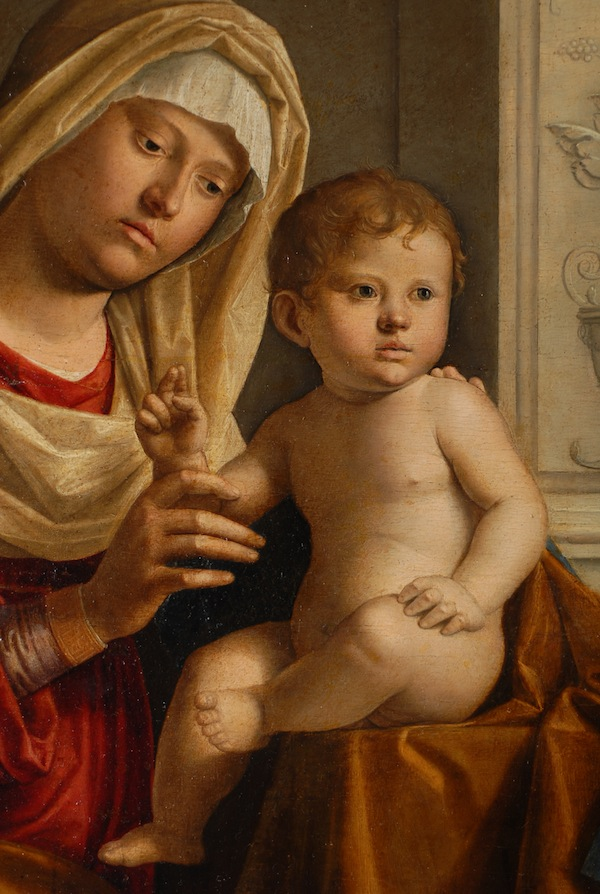
Detail of the Madonna and Child

== Bibliography ==
- Fornari Schianchi, Lucia (1997). Galleria Nazionale di Parma, Catalogo delle opere. Milan: Franco Maria Ricci.
- Villa, Giovanni C. F. (2010). Cima da Conegliano. Poeta del paesaggio, catalogo della mostra Conegliano 2010. Venice: Marsilio.
- Humfrey, Peter (1983). Cima da Conegliano. Cambridge: Cambridge University Press.
