= Saints Roch, Anthony Abbot and Lucy =

Painting by Cima da Conegliano

Three Saints: Roch, Anthony Abbot, and Lucy
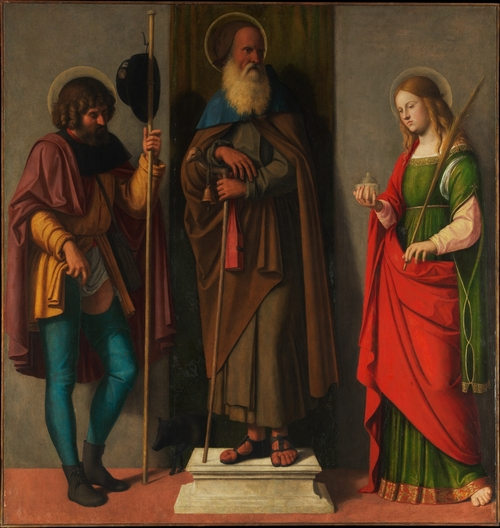
- Artist: Cima da Conegliano
- Year: c.1513
- Medium: Oil on canvas, transferred from wood
- Dimensions: 128.3 cm × 121.9 cm (50.5 in × 48.0 in)
- Location: Metropolitan Museum of Art; New York
- Accession: 07.149

Saints Roch, Anthony Abbot and Lucy or Three Saints is a 1513 oil on canvas (previously wood) painting by Cima da Conegliano, which is now in the collection of the Metropolitan Museum of Art in New York.

It was painted in Parma, where it may have provided one of the inspirations for Correggio's Four Saints. As its name suggests, it shows Saint Anthony Abbot (with a little alms bell hanging from the handle of his crutch) flanked by Saint Roch (pointing out the ulcer on his thigh) and Saint Lucy (with an oil lamp and martyr's palm). Since St Anthony is depicted elevated in the centre and since St Roch is a patron saint of plague sufferers, it may have been commissioned for the Hospital Brothers of St. Anthony, who ministered to plague victims. It was later misattributed to Giovanni Bellini, Cima's probable teacher.

It is currently (2018) not on view.

== Provenance ==
The work was once in the collection of the Empress Josephine at Malmaison (as a work of Bellini) and later in that of her son Eugène de Beauharnais, Viceroy of Italy. From 1843 to 1904 it was part of the Duke of Leuchtenberg’s collection at Munich and St Petersburg and was acquired by the Metropolitan Museum in 1907. The painting suffered during the transfer from panel to canvas and may have also been reduced in size.
