= Saint Peter Martyr with Saints Nicholas and Benedict =

Painting by Cima da Conegliano, c. 1505

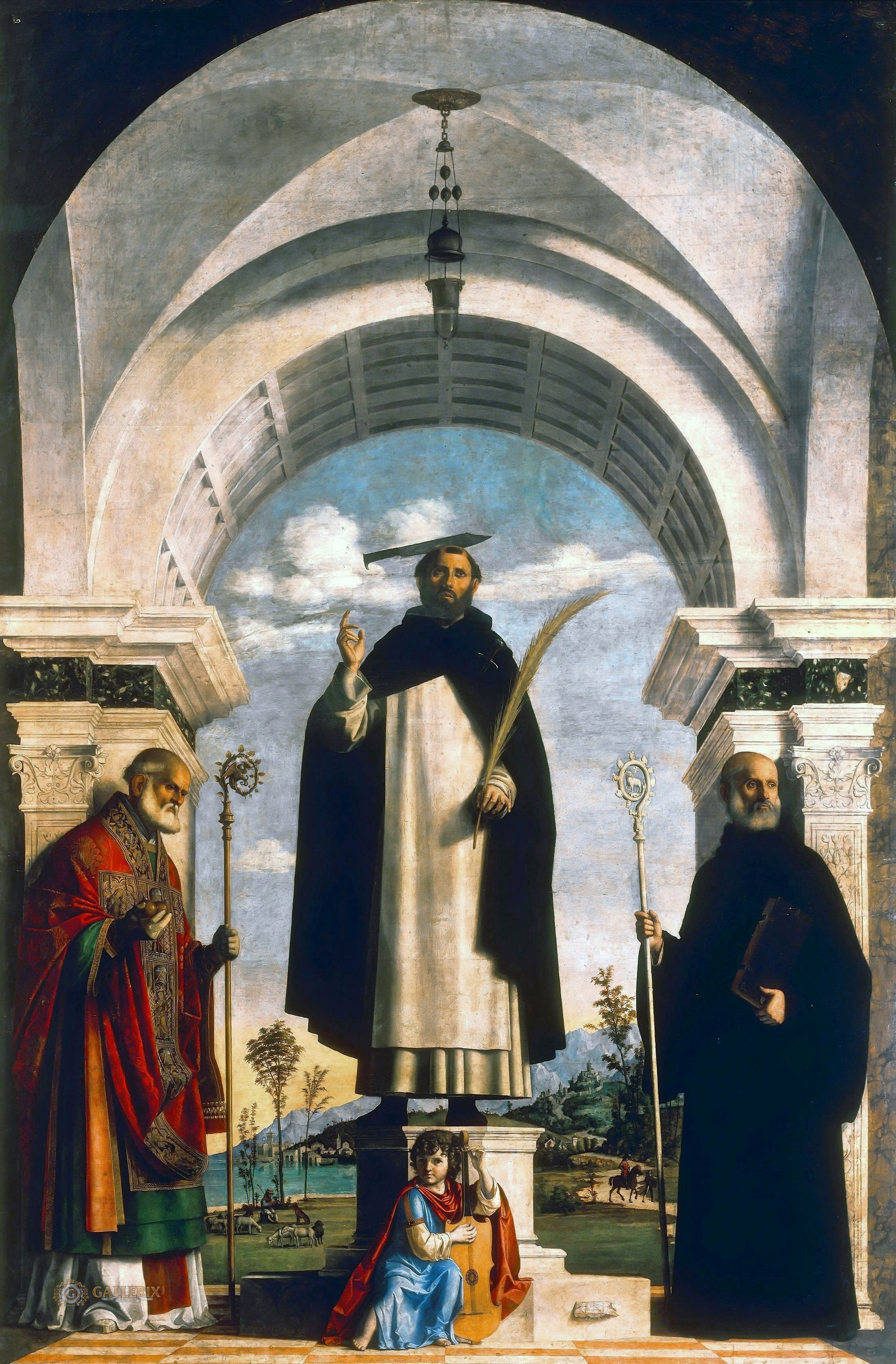
Saint Peter Martyr with Saints Nicholas and Benedict (c. 1505–1506)

Saint Peter Martyr with Saints Nicholas and Benedict is an oil painting on canvas by the Italian Renaissance painter Cima da Conegliano, created c. 1505–1506, now in the Pinacoteca di Brera in Milan. It references the sacra conversazione pieces by Giovanni Bellini, whilst the landscape shows the artist as an early adopter of the new style of Giorgione.

The work was commissioned by the spice merchant Benedetto Carlone for the chapel dedicated to Saint Peter Martyr in Corpus Domini, a church in Venice, where he planned to be buried. It shows the saint dressed in Dominican habit. The church was suppressed under the Napoleonic occupation of Italy and the painting arrived at the Brera in 1811.

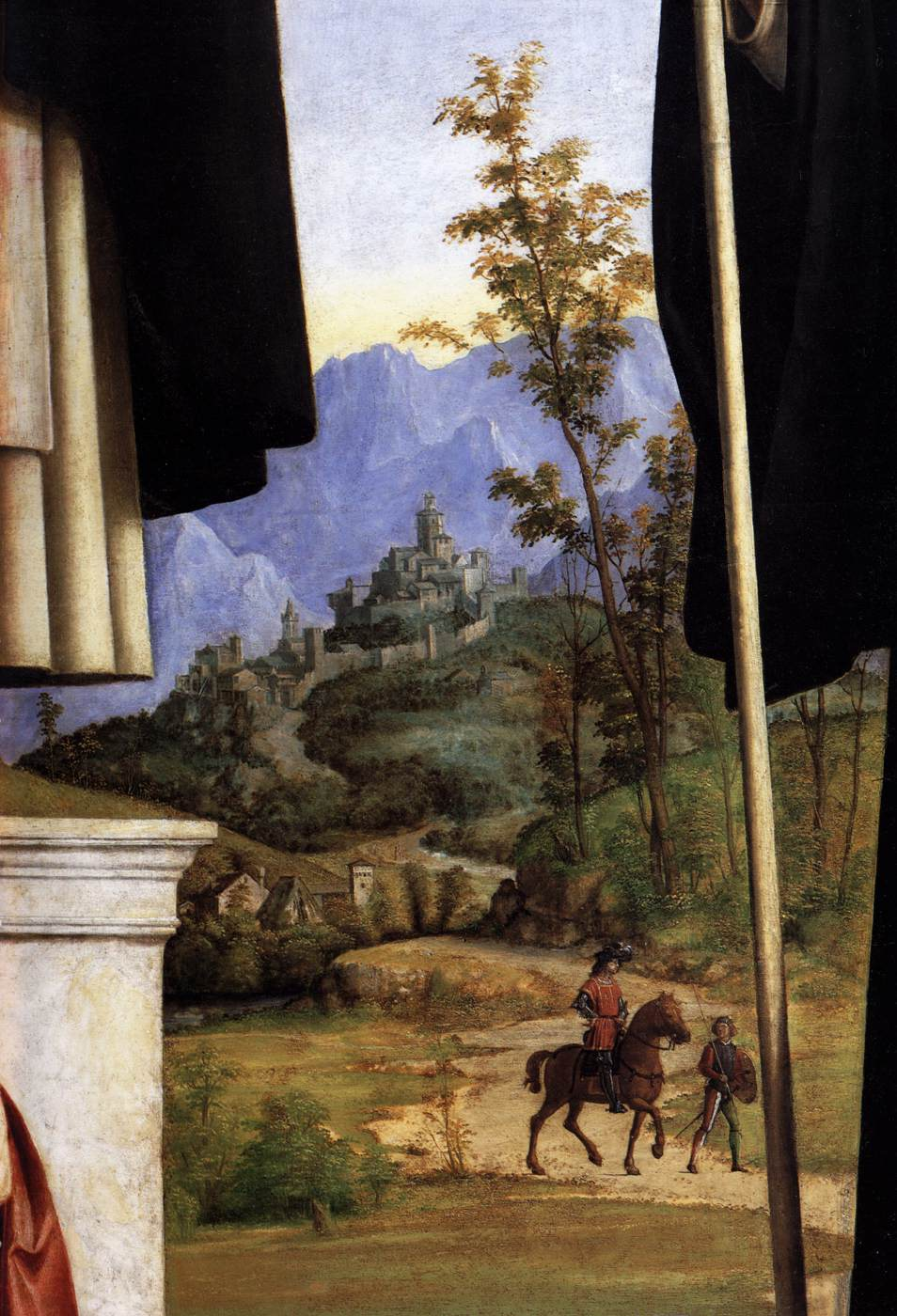
Detail of the landscape
