= Theseus Killing the Minotaur =

Painting by Cima da Conegliano

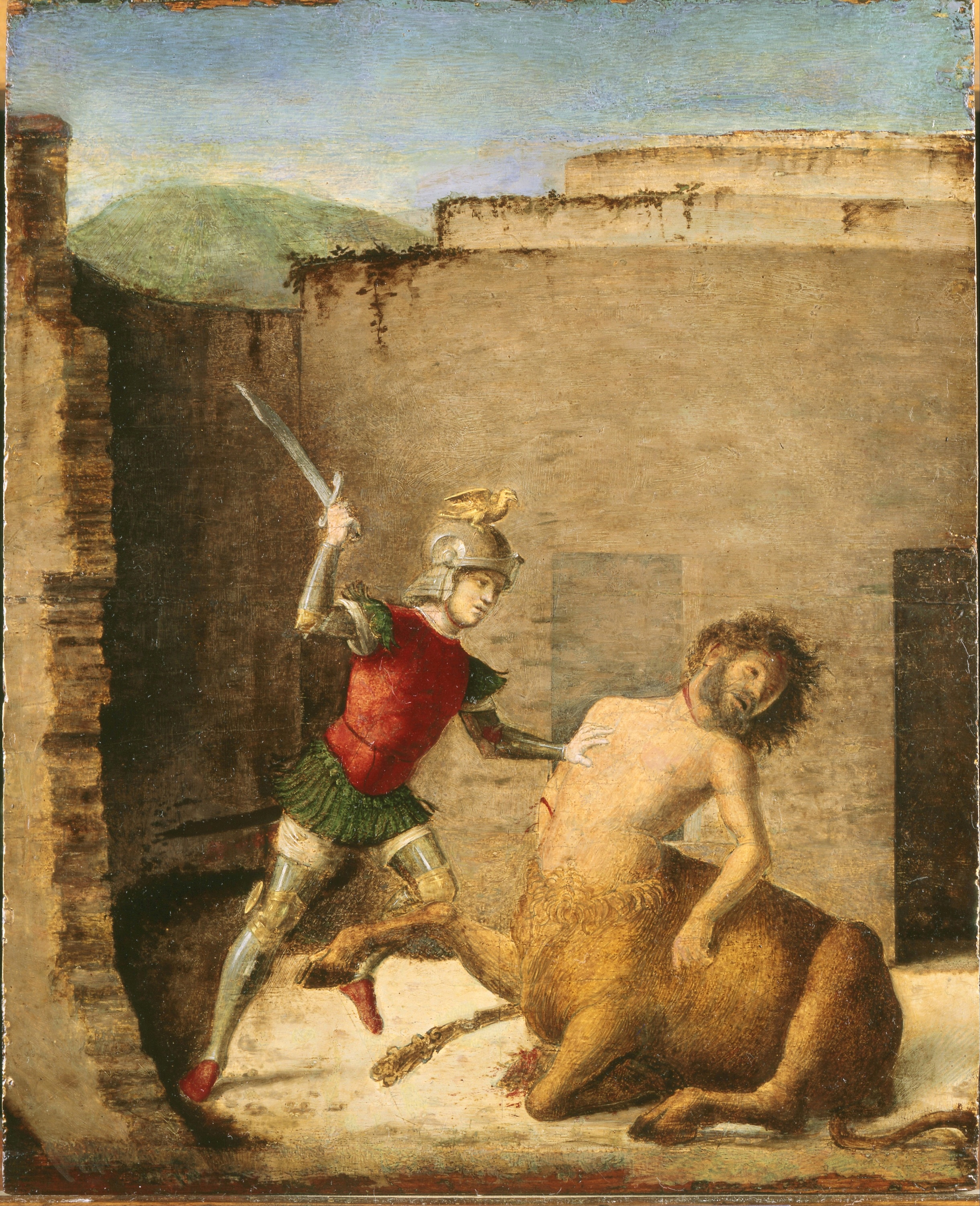
- Artist: Cima da Conegliano
- Year: c. 1505
- Medium: Oil on panel
- Dimensions: 38.2 centimetres (15.0 in) × 30.8 centimetres (12.1 in)
- Location: Museo Poldi Pezzoli, Milan

Theseus Killing the Minotaur is an oil-on-panel painting by Cima da Conegliano, created c. 1505, now in the Museo Poldi Pezzoli in Milan. It depicts a scene of Greek mythology, when Theseus killed the Minotaur in Crete's labyrinth.

It measures 38.2 centimetres (15.0 in) by 30.8 centimetres (12.1 in).
