= Presentation of the Virgin at the Temple (Cima) =

Painting by Cima da Conegliano

Presentation of the Virgin Mary at the Temple
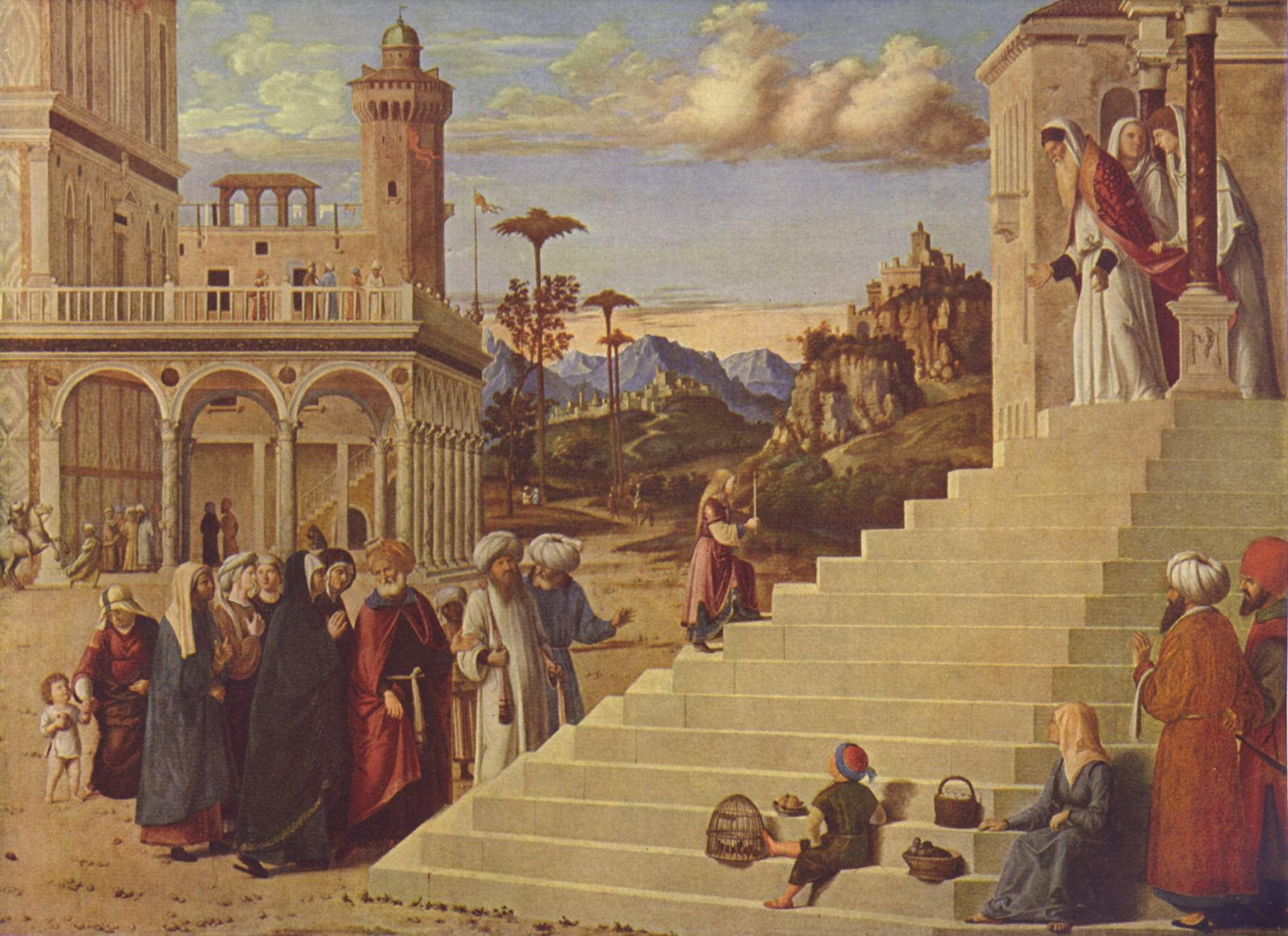
- Artist: Cima da Conegliano
- Year: 1496–1497
- Medium: Oil on panel
- Subject: Presentation of Mary
- Dimensions: 105 cm × 145 cm (41 in × 57 in)
- Location: Gemäldegalerie Alte Meister, Dresden

The Presentation of the Virgin Mary at the Temple is a painting by the Italian Renaissance master Cima da Conegliano, c. 1496–1497, in the Gemäldegalerie Alte Meister of Dresden, Germany, of the Presentation of Mary. The work presents the theme, apocryphal, but common in Christian art, of the presentation of the Virgin Mary in the Temple of Jerusalem, during her childhood.
