= The Archangel Raphael and Tobias with Two Saints =

Painting by Cima da Conegliano

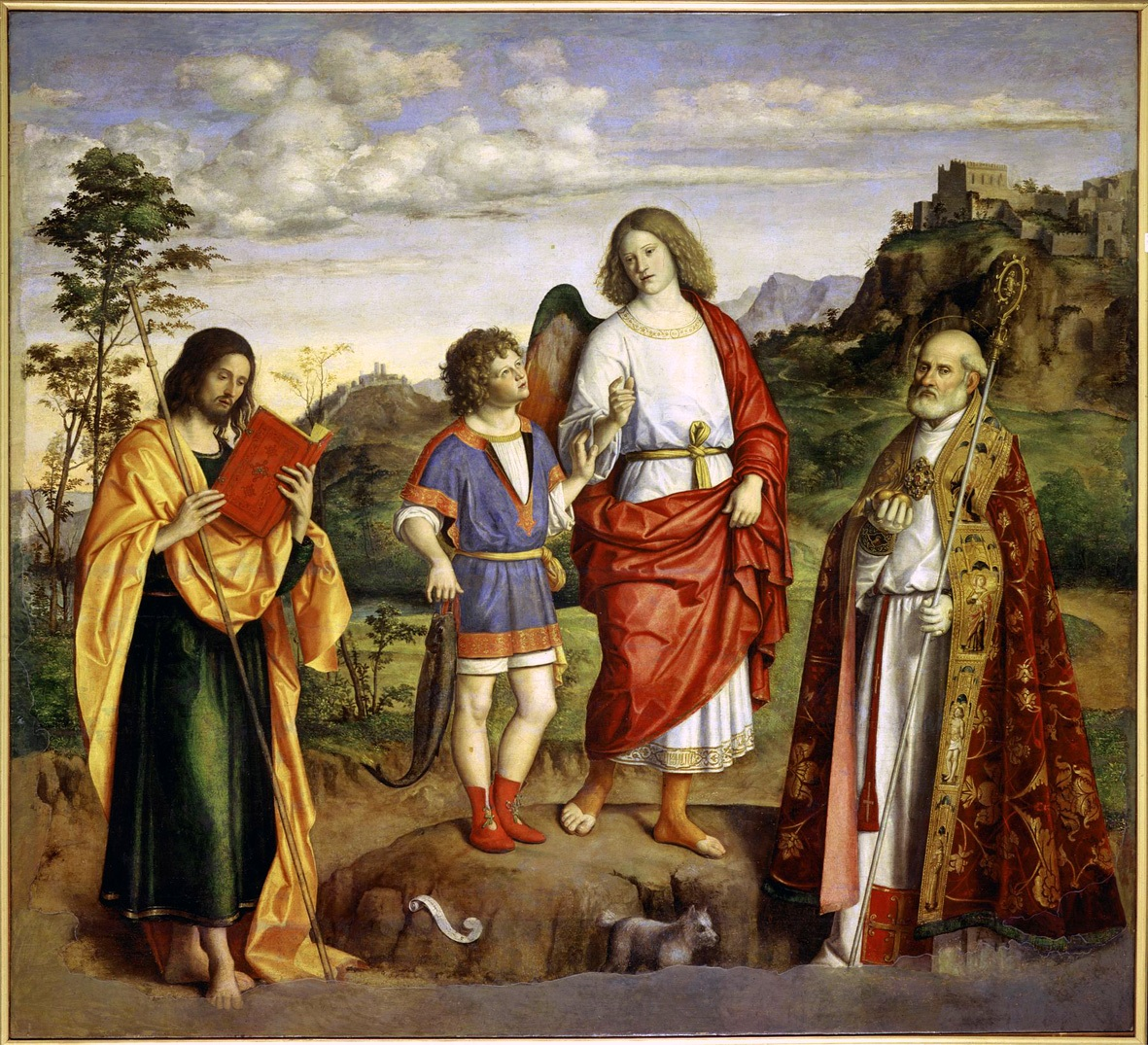
The Archangel Raphael and Tobias with Two Saints

The Archangel Raphael and Tobias with Two Saints is an undated oil painting by Cima da Conegliano, now in the Gallerie dell'Accademia in Venice. To the left of the composition is Saint James the Great and to the right is Saint Nicholas of Bari. It measures 162 cm (63.7 in) by 178 cm (70 in).

The central pair include the fish carried by Tobias, and the dog below, from the narrative subject of Tobias and the Angel, very popular at the time. Documented in the church of Santa Maria della Misericordia in Venice, in the 19th century it passed to the art market, and was transferred from the original wood panel to canvas.
