= Annunciation (Cima) =

1495 painting by Cima da Conegliano

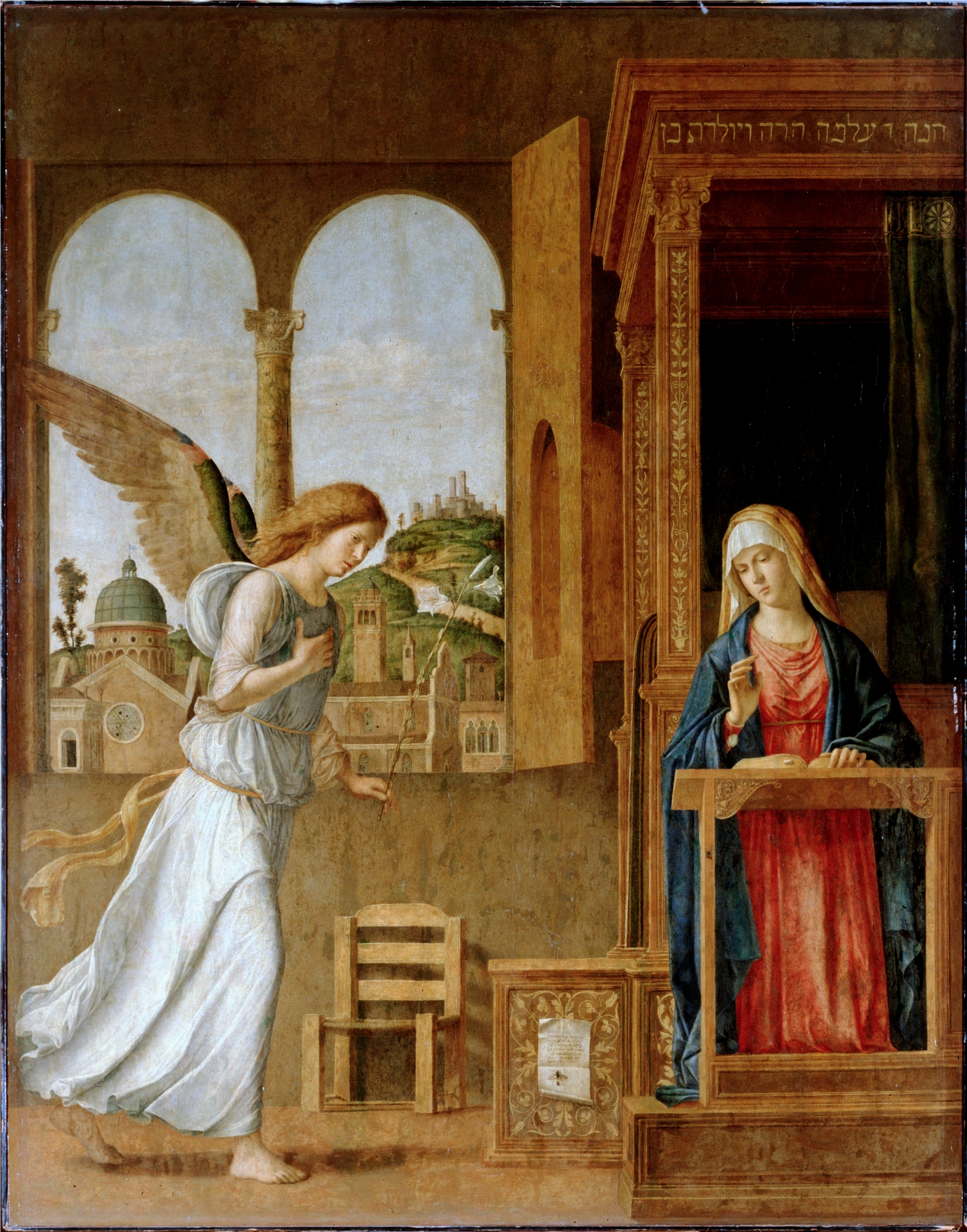
Annunciation (1495), by Cima da Conegliano

The Annunciation is a 1495 oil on panel painting by Cima da Conegliano, now in the Hermitage Museum, in Saint Petersburg, Russia.
