= Christ Enthroned (Cima da Conegliano) =

Painting by Cima da Conegliano

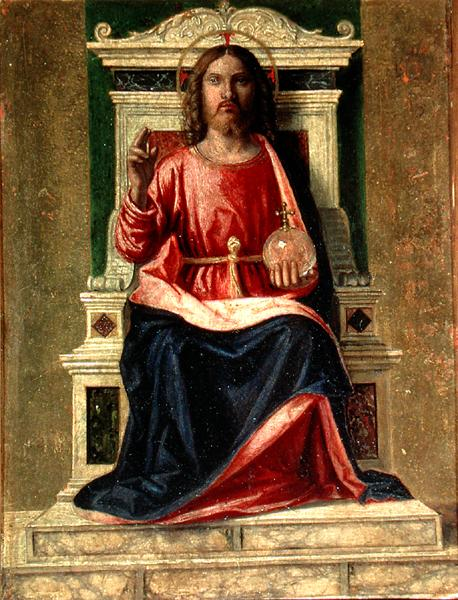

Christ Enthroned is a tempera on panel painting with gold leaf background by Cima da Conegliano, painted before 1505. Christ is seated on a marble throne, two fingers of his right hand raised in a benediction, and the left hand holding a globus cruciger. It measures 20 cm × 15 cm (7.9 in × 5.9 in) and was initially part of a larger altarpiece, probably its predella. It was owned by Friedrich von Pourtalès then Osip Braz, and was seized from the latter by the Soviet state on the October Revolution and assigned to the Hermitage Museum. It was transferred to the Pushkin Museum in Moscow in 1928, where it still hangs.
