= Mestre Altarpiece =

Altarpiece by Cima da Conegliano

The Mestre Altarpiece was a c. 1500–1502 altarpiece by Cima da Conegliano. The side panels of Saint Roch and Saint Sebastian from the work are now in the Musée des Beaux-Arts in Strasbourg, whilst the central section showing St Catherine of Alexandria and the lunette of Madonna and Child between St Dominic and St Francis are both in the Wallace Collection in London. The central section is signed on a pedestal "JOANIS BABTISTE CONEGLANESIS OPUS".

The work was commissioned by the church of San Rocco in Mestre. After the 1630 plague it was swapped for a marble altarpiece and Cima's work was moved to San Lorenzo church, where it was forgotten. A poor copy, probably produced in the late 18th century, is still in the sacristy of San Lorenzo. Cima's work was later acquired by John Strange, English resident in Venice, before the end of the 18th century. It was then sold at Stanley's on 12 June 1834 and was split up between 1832 and 1857—the latter was the date the central portion was first recorded at Thirlestaine House. After an attempt by Ludwig, M. Cook was the first to reconstruct the altarpiece thanks to discovering a relatively faithful 18th-century engraving of the whole work produced by Baratta.

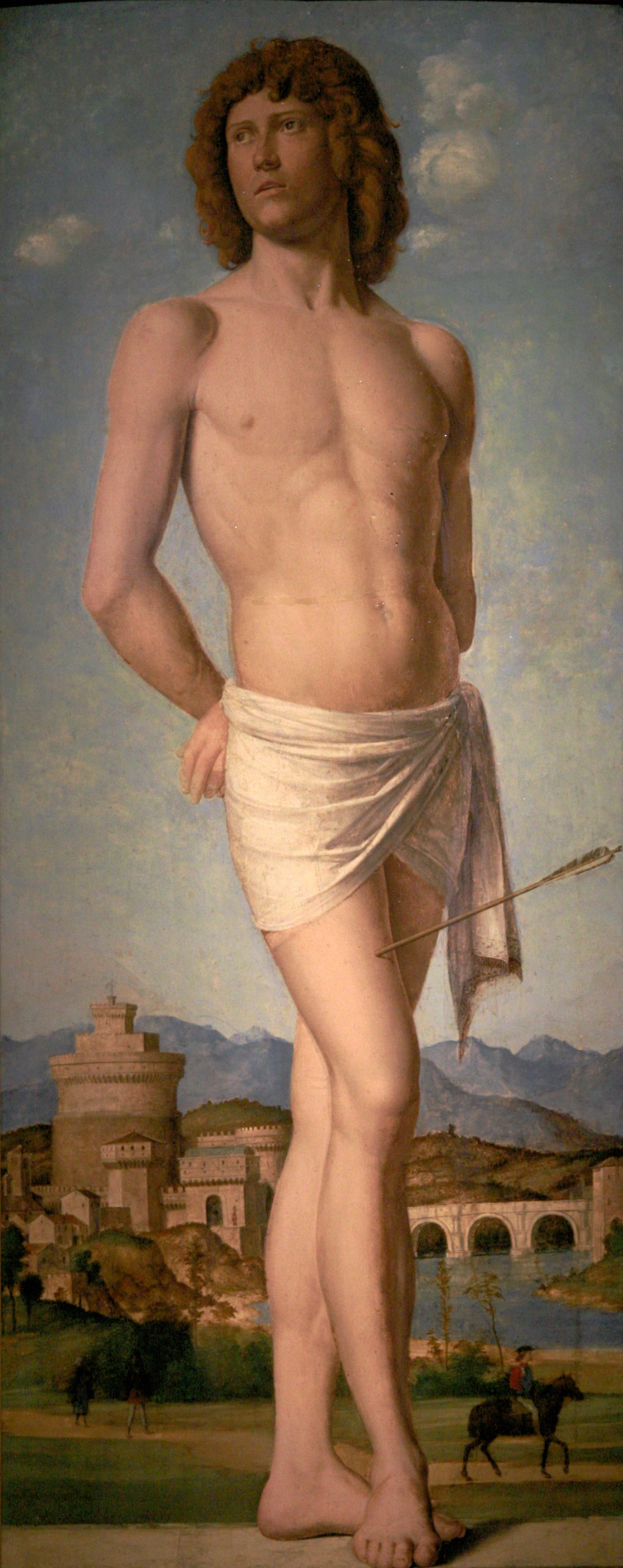
St Sebastian

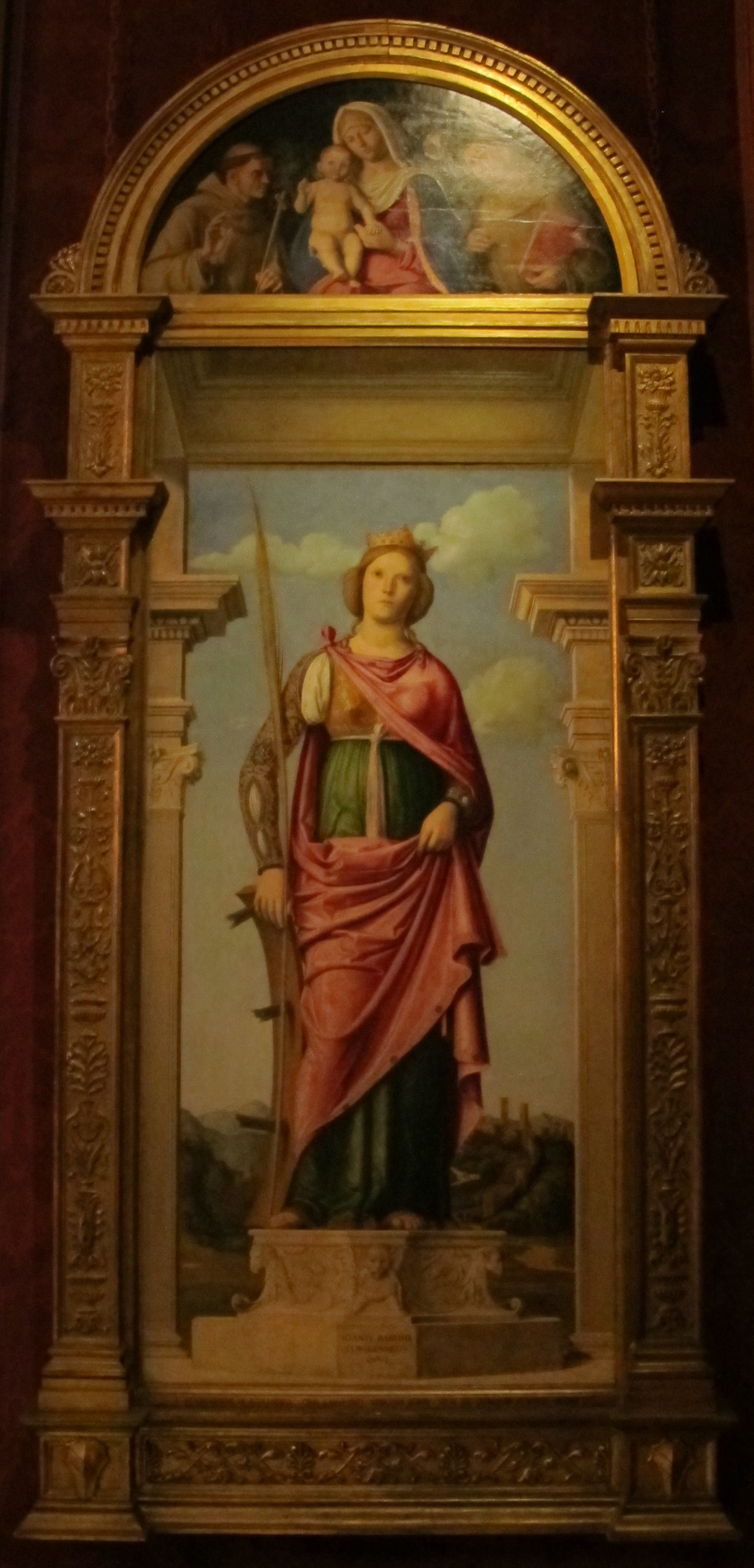
St Catherine and Madonna and Child

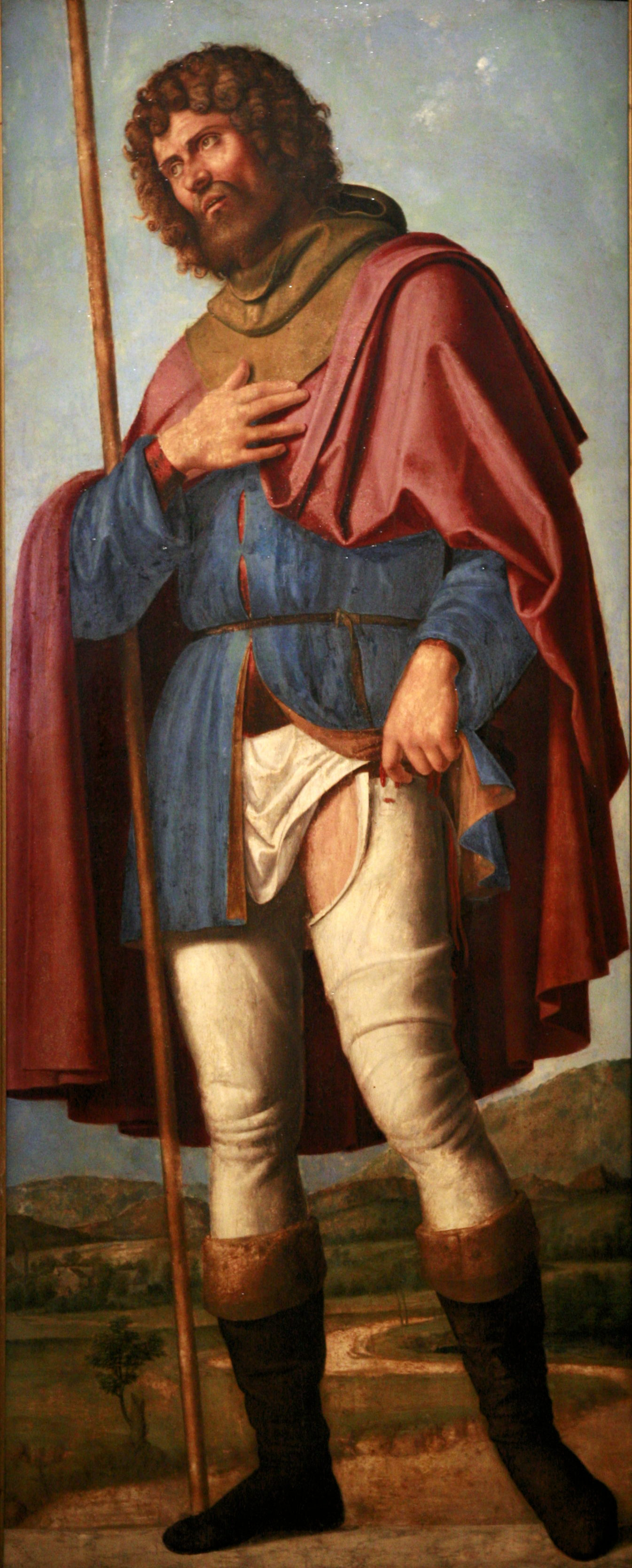
St Roch
