= Cima da Conegliano =

Italian Renaissance painter (c. 1459 – c. 1517)

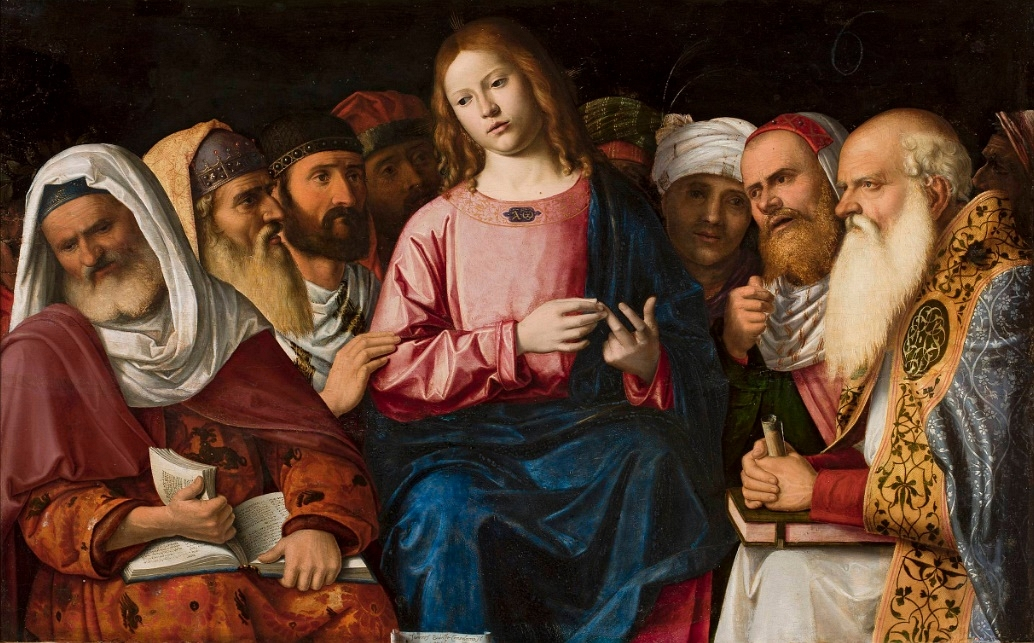
Christ among the doctors, 1504, National Museum in Warsaw

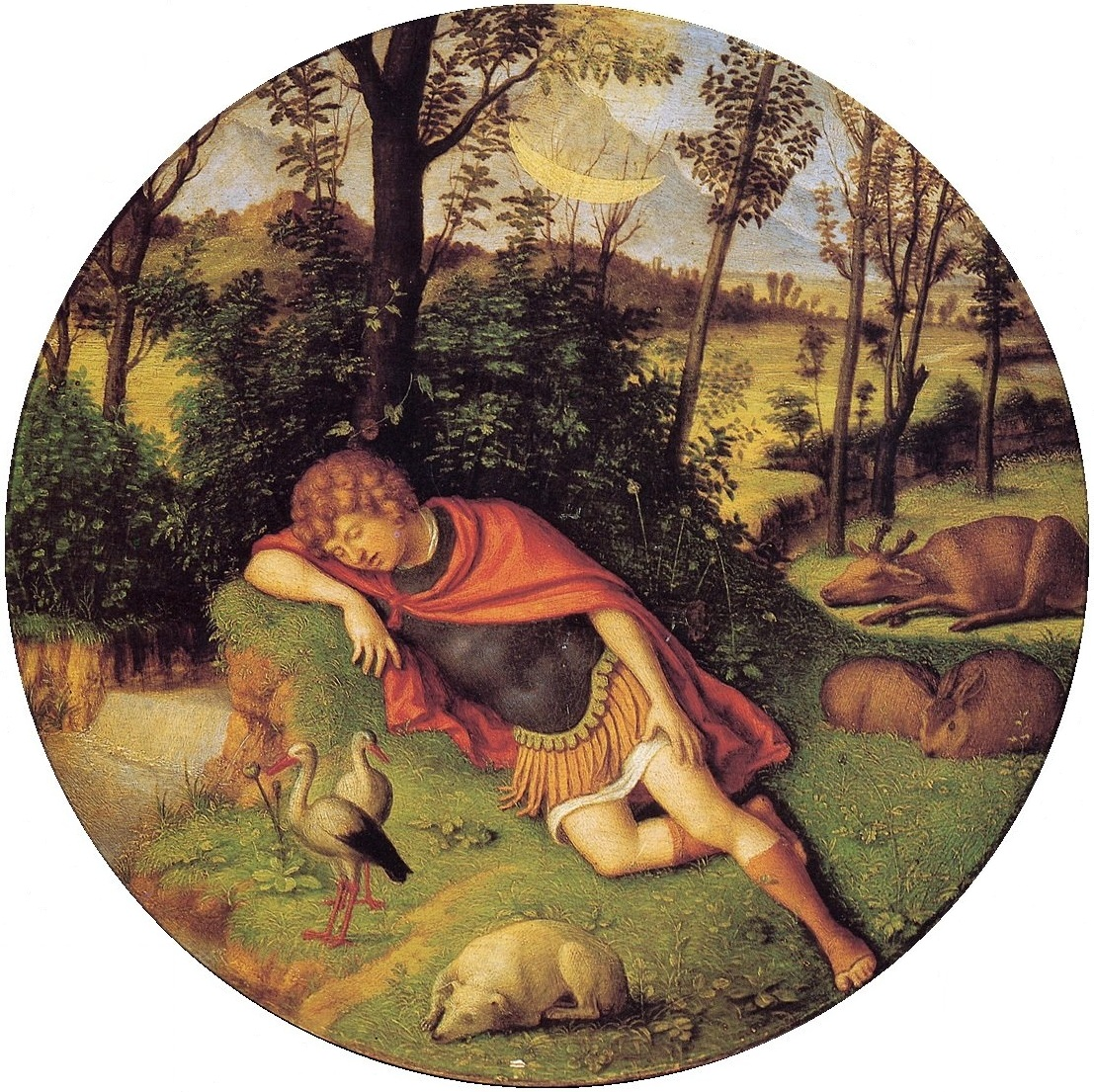
Sleeping Endymion

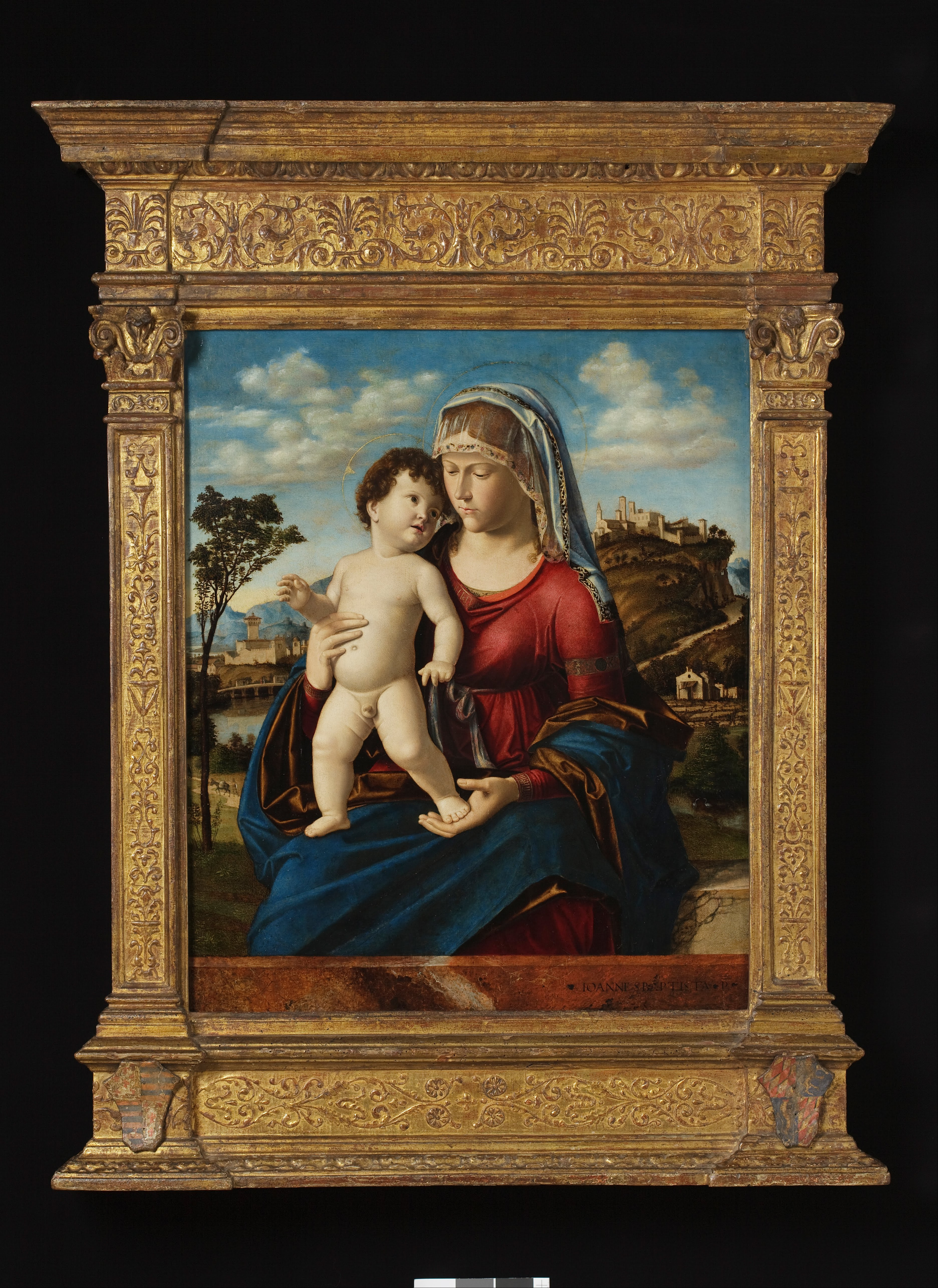
Madonna and Child, a popular composition found in many good versions

Giovanni Battista Cima, also called Cima da Conegliano (c. 1459 – c. 1517), was an Italian Renaissance painter, who mostly worked in Venice. He can be considered part of the Venetian school, though he was also influenced by Antonello da Messina, in the emphasis he gives to landscape backgrounds and the tranquil atmosphere of his works.

Once formed his style did not change greatly. He mostly painted religious subjects, often on a small scale for homes rather than churches, but also a few, mostly small, mythological ones. He often repeated popular subjects in different versions with slight variations, including his Madonnas and Saint Jerome in a Landscape. His paintings of the Madonna and Child include several variations of a composition that have a standing infant Jesus, which in turn are repeated several times.

== Biography ==
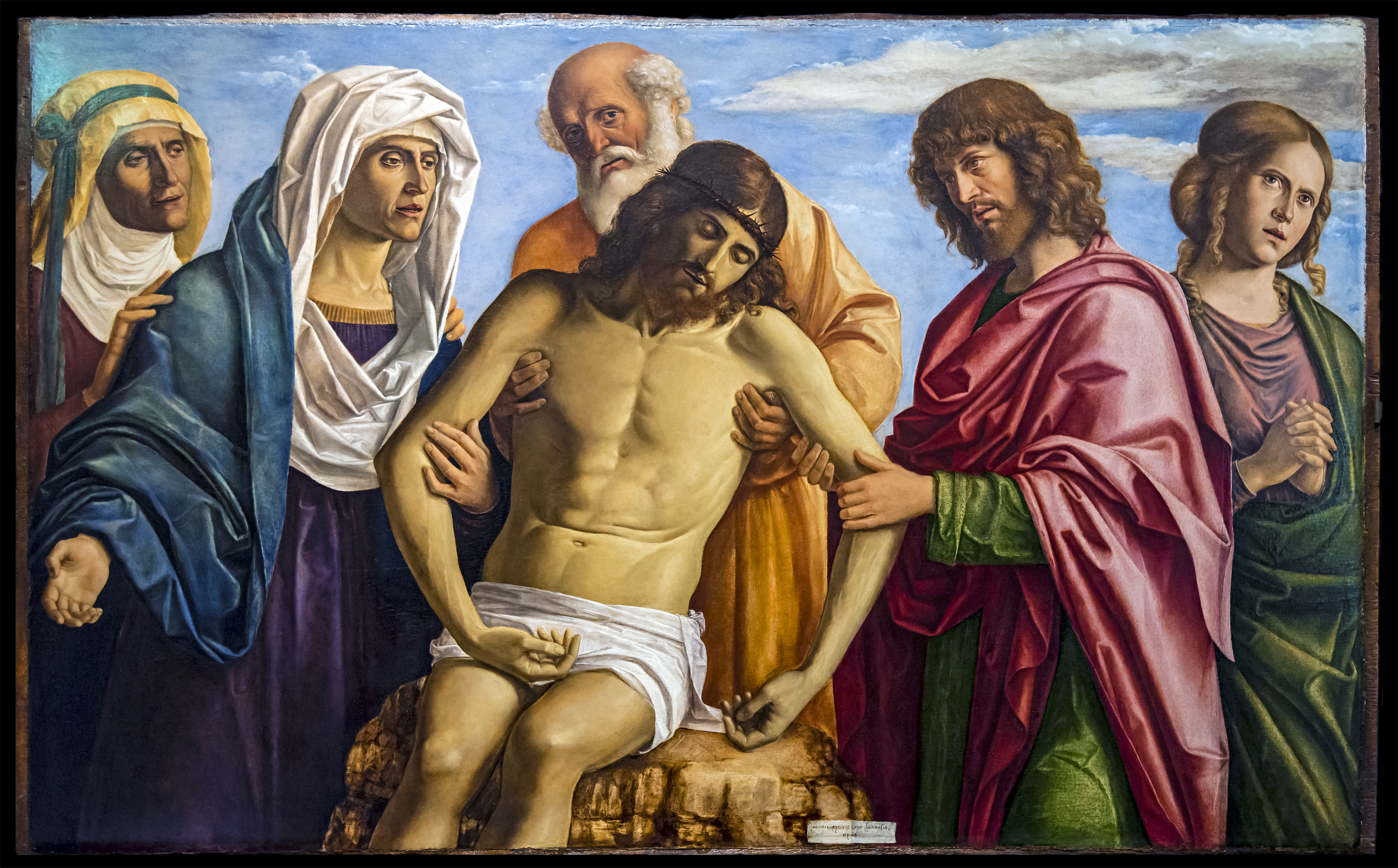
Nicodemus with Christ's body, the Apostle John on the right and Mary to left.

Giovanni Battista Cima was born at Conegliano, then part of the terrafirma of the Republic of Venice but now part of the province of Treviso, in 1459 or 1460. His father, who died in 1484, was a cloth-shearer (cimator), hence the family surname.

In 1488 the young painter was at work at Vicenza; in 1492 he established himself at Venice, but by the summer of 1516 he had returned to his native place. Cima married twice, his first wife, Corona, bore him two sons, the older of whom took Holy orders at Padua. By Joanna, his second wife, he had six children, three being daughters.

His oldest painting inscribed with a date is the Madonna of the Arbour (1489; now in Museum of Vicenza). This picture is done in distemper and savours so much of the style of Bartolomeo Montagna, who lived at Vicenza from 1480, as to make it highly probable that Cima was his pupil. Even in this early production Cima gave evidence of the serious calm, and almost passionless spirit that so eminently characterized him. Later he fell under the influence of Giovanni Bellini and became one of his ablest successors, forming a happy, if not indispensable link between this master and Titian.

According to the 1913 Catholic Encyclopedia:

At first his figures were somewhat crude, but they gradually lost their harshness and gained in grace while still preserving the dignity. In the background of his facile, harmonious compositions the mountains of his country are invested with new importance. Cima was one of the first Italians to assign a place for landscape depiction, and to formulate the laws of atmosphere and of the distribution of light and shade. His Baptism of Christ in the church of San Giovanni in Bragora, in Venice (1492), gives striking evidence of this. The colouring is rich and right with a certain silvery tone peculiar to Cima, but which in his later works merges into a delicate gold. His conceptions are usually calm and undramatic, and he has painted scarcely any scenes (having depicted religious ones almost exclusively) that are not suggestive of "sante conversazioni". His Incredulity of St. Thomas (National Gallery, London) and his beautiful Nativity (Venice, Santa Maria dei Carmini, 1509) are hardly aught else. But most of his paintings represent Madonnas enthroned among the elect, and in these subjects he observes a gently animated symmetry. The groupings of these sainted figures, even though they may not have a definitely pious character, and the impression of unspeakable peace.

Among his pupils were his son, Carlo da Conegliano, and Vittore Belliniano. It is unclear if Francesco Beccaruzzi, who was born in Conegliano in 1492, received direct training from Cima.

== Selected works ==
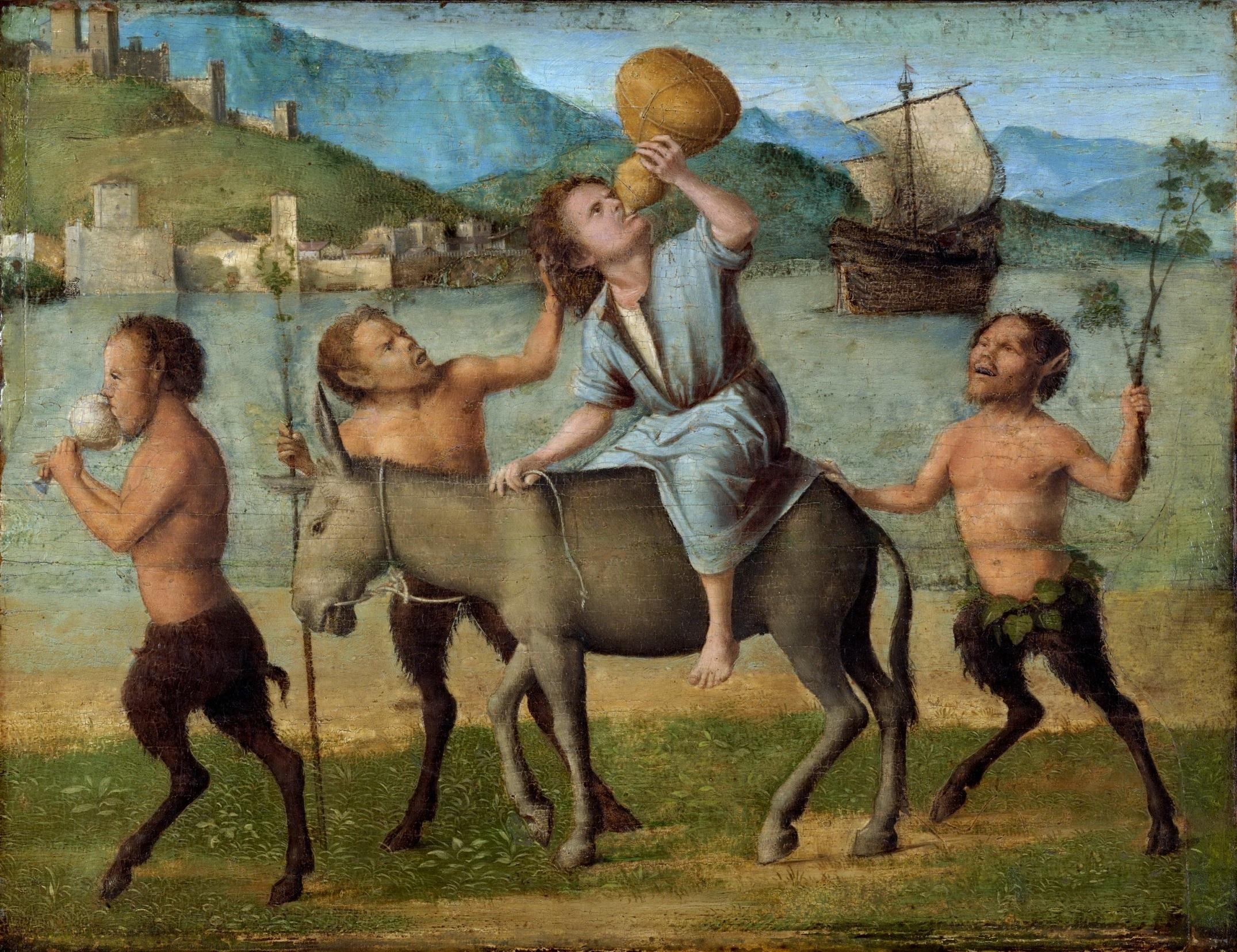
Satyrs, 1505–1510

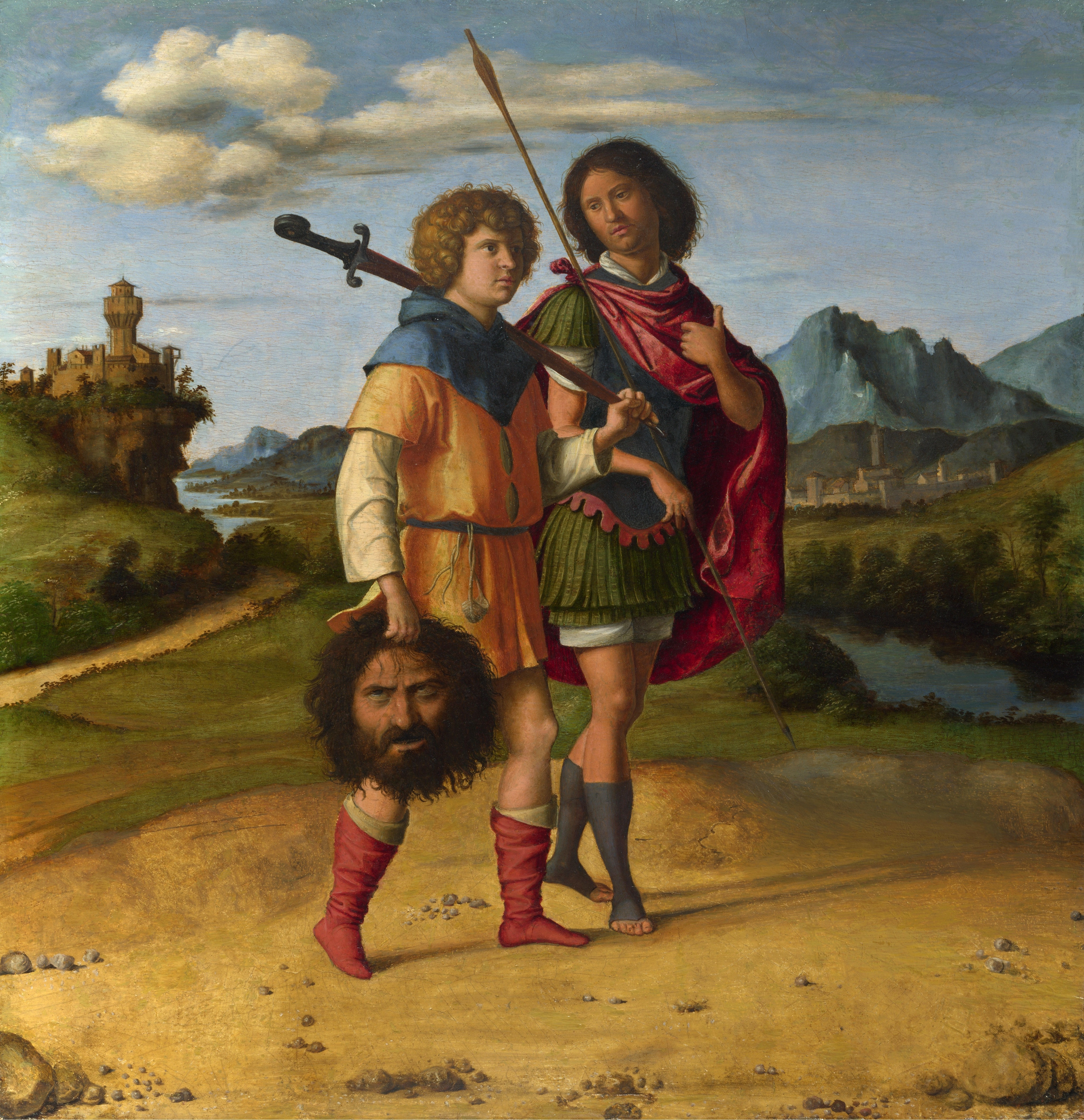
David and Jonathan, 1505–1510

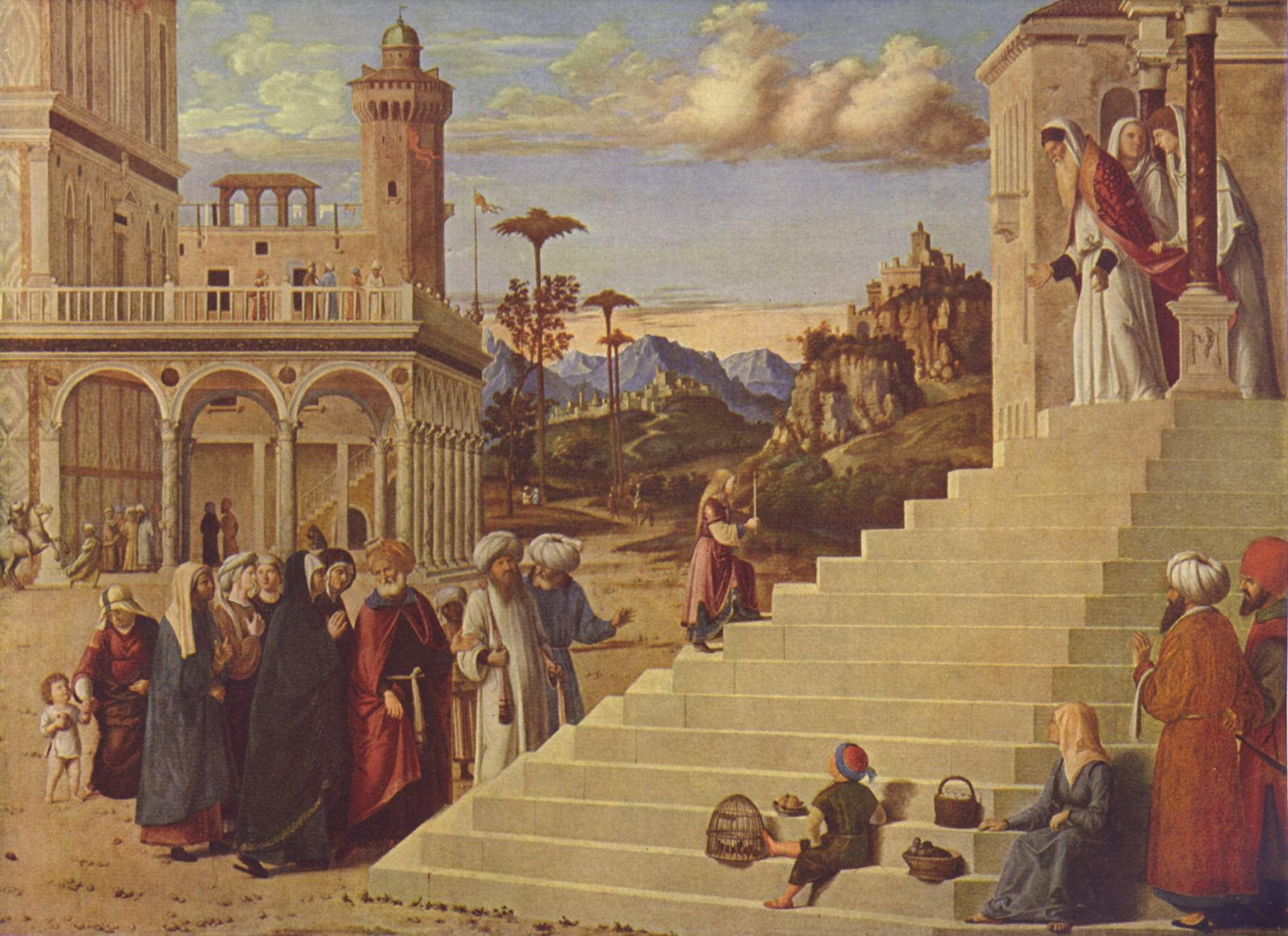
The Presentation of the Virgin, 1496–1497

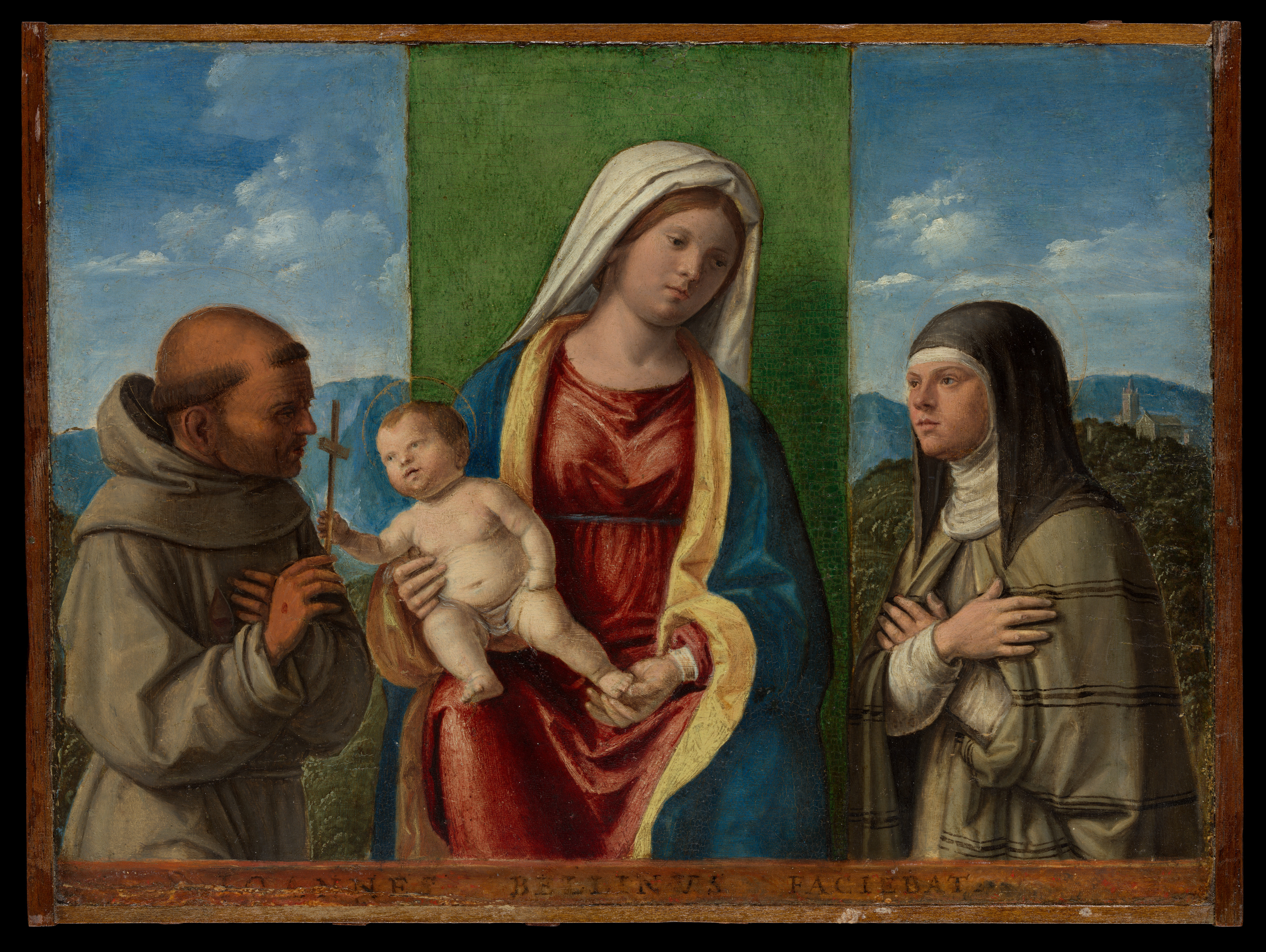
Madonna and Child with Saints Francis and Clare, 1510s, The Metropolitan Museum of Art

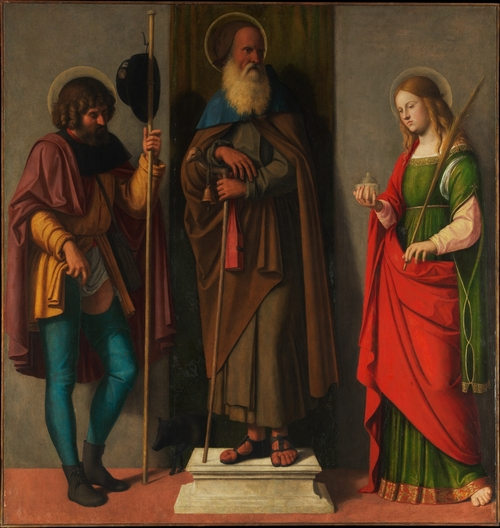
Three Saints: Roch, Anthony Abbot, and Lucy, 1513, The Metropolitan Museum of Art

- Baptism of Christ (1492) - Oil on panel, San Giovanni in Bragora, Venice.
- Annunciation (1495) - Tempera and oil on canvas, 136.5 x 107 cm, Hermitage, St. Petersburg.
- St. Helena (1495) - Panel, National Gallery of Art, Washington
- Maria with Child, Mary Magdalene and St. Hieronymus (c. 1495) - Wood, Alte Pinakothek, Munich.
- Madonna of the Orange Tree (c. 1495) - Tempera and oil on panel, 211 x 139 cm, Gallerie dell'Accademia, Venice.
- Madonna and Child Enthroned with St. Peter, St. Romuald, St. Benedict, and St. Paul (c. 1495–1497) - Tempera on panel, Gemäldegalerie, Berlin.
- Madonna and Child (1496–1499) - Oil on canvas, Hermitage, St. Petersburg, Russia.
- Madonna and Child in a Landscape (c. 1496–1499) - Oil on panel, transmitted to canvas, North Carolina Museum of Art, Raleigh.
- Virgin and Child (1496–1499) - Oil on wood, National Gallery, London.
- Presentation of the Virgin Mary at the Temple (c. 1497–1500) - Oil on wood, Gemäldegalerie Alte Meister, Dresden, Germany.
- The Virgin and Child (1499–1502) - Oil on wood, National Gallery, London.
- Madonna and Child with Michael the Archangel and St Andrew (c. end of 15th century) - Oil on panel, 194x134 cm, Galleria nazionale di Parma.
- Madonna and Child with Saints Jerome and John the Baptist (c. 1500) - Oil on panel, National Gallery of Art, Washington, D.C.
- The Virgin and Child with Saints Francis and Anthony of Padua (c. 1500) - Oak panel, Wallace Collection, London.
- Incredulity of St Thomas with St Magnus Bishop (c. 1505) - Tempera and oil on panel, 215 x 151 cm, Gallerie dell'Accademia, Venice
- St Sebastian and Saint Roch (1500–1502) - Diptych, Oil on panel, 116.5 x 47 cm each, Musée des Beaux-Arts de Strasbourg, Strasbourg.
- St Catherine of Alexandria and Madonna and Child (1500–1502) - Central panel, Oil on panel, Wallace Collection, London.
- Christ among the Doctors - National Museum in Warsaw, Poland
- Saints Peter Martyr, Nicholas of Bari, Benedict and an Angel Musician (1504) - Oil on panel, 330 x 216 cm, Pinacoteca di Brera, Milan.
- Madonna and Child (c. 1504) - Tempera on wood, 66 x 57 cm, Galleria degli Uffizi, Florence.
- Virgin and Child (1504–1507) - Louvre, Paris.
- Christ Enthroned (before 1505) - Pushkin Museum, Moscow.
- Virgin and Child (c. 1505) - Oil on wood, National Gallery, London.
- Theseus Killing the Minotaur (c. 1505) - Oil on panel, Museo Poldi Pezzoli, Milan
- St Peter Martyr with St Nicholas and St Benedict (c. 1505–1506) - oil on canvas, Pinacoteca di Brera, Milan
- Bacchic Cassone (c. 1505–1510) - oil on wood panel, now split into four pieces
- Montini Altarpiece (c. 1506–1507) - panel, Galleria Nazionale, Parma
- Virgin and Child with Saints Paul and Francis (1508–1530) - Oil on wood, National Gallery, London.
- Adoration of the Shepherds (c. 1509–10) - Tempera on panel, Santa Maria del Carmini, Venice.
- Virgin and child with St George and St James (1510–1511) - Musée des Beaux-Arts de Caen, Caen.
- Virgin and Child with St John the Baptist and St Mary Magdalene (1511–1513) - Tempera on panel, 167 x 110 cm, Louvre, Paris.
- Virgin and Child with Saints Sebastian, Francis, John the Baptist, Jerome, Anthony of Padua, and an Unidentified Female Saint, and Two Donors (c. 1515) - Oil on panel, Harvard University Art Museums, Massachusetts.
- Virgin with Child and St John the Baptist and St Francis - Musée du Petit Palais, Avignon.
- Virgin and Child with Saints and Donors (c. 1515) - Cleveland Museum of Art, Cleveland, Ohio.
- Saint Peter Enthroned with Saints John the Baptist and Paul (c.1516) - Oil on canvas, Pinacoteca di Brera, Milan
- The Deposition - Oil on panel, Pushkin Art Museum, Moscow
- The Archangel Raphael and Tobias with Two Saints (undated) - oil on panel, Gallerie dell'Accademia, Venice

== See also ==
- Ciro da Conegliano
