= San Daniele =

San Daniele may refer to:

- San Daniele, Padua, a Roman Catholic church and monastery in Padua, region of Veneto, Italy
- San Daniele del Friuli, municipality in the Province of Udine in the Italian region Friuli-Venezia Giulia, in Italy
- San Daniele Po, municipality in the Province of Cremona in the Italian region Lombardy, in Italy
