= Santi Apostoli, Venice =

7th-century Roman Catholic church in Venice, Italy

Chiesa dei Santi Apostoli di Cristo; Church of the Holy Apostles of Christ
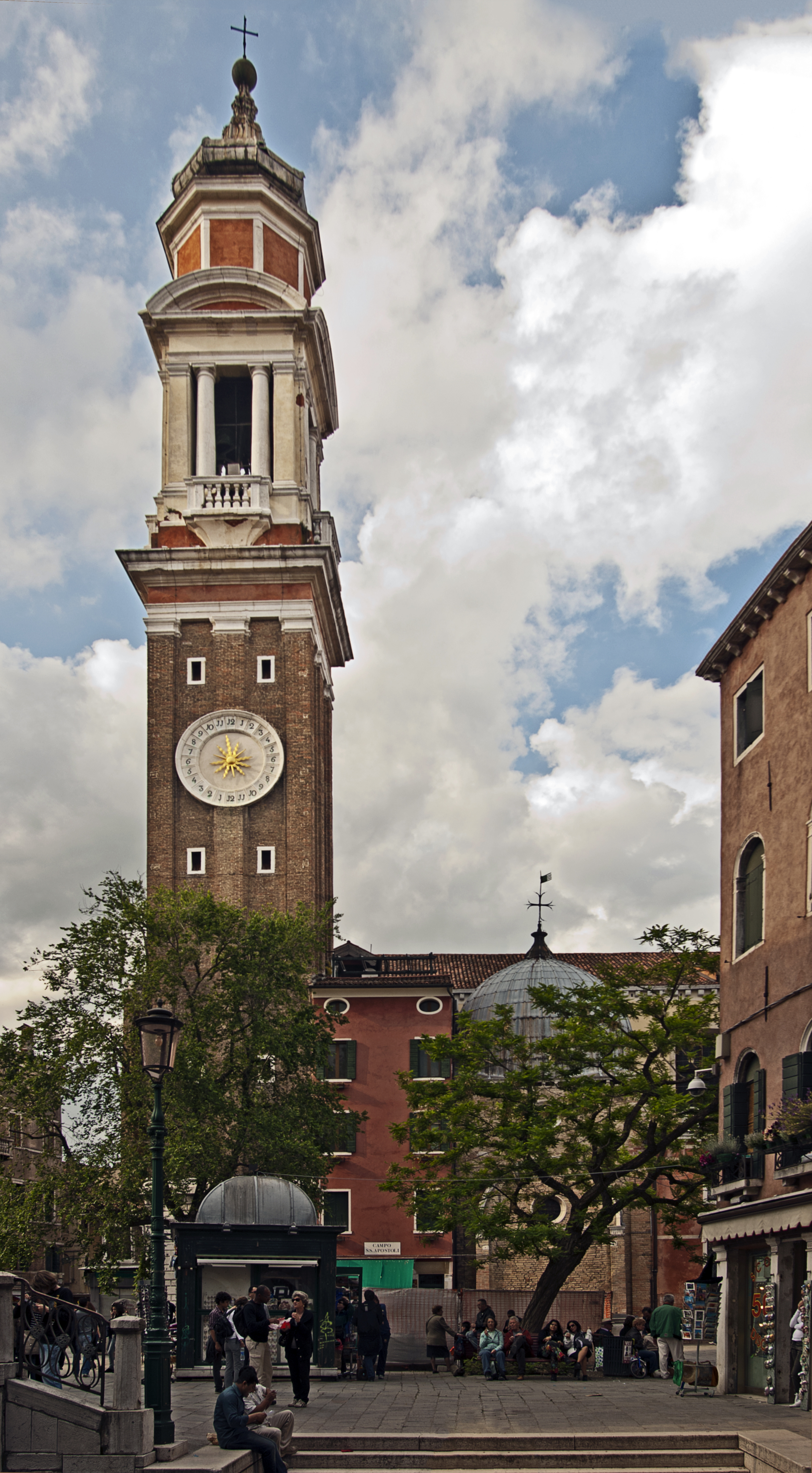
- The campanile and the campo of San Apostoli

- Location within Venice

Religion
- Affiliation: Roman Catholic
- Status: Active

Location
- Municipality: Venice
- Country: Italy
- Coordinates: 45°26′25.81″N 12°20′11.87″E

Architecture
- Type: Church
- Style: Gothic-Renaissance

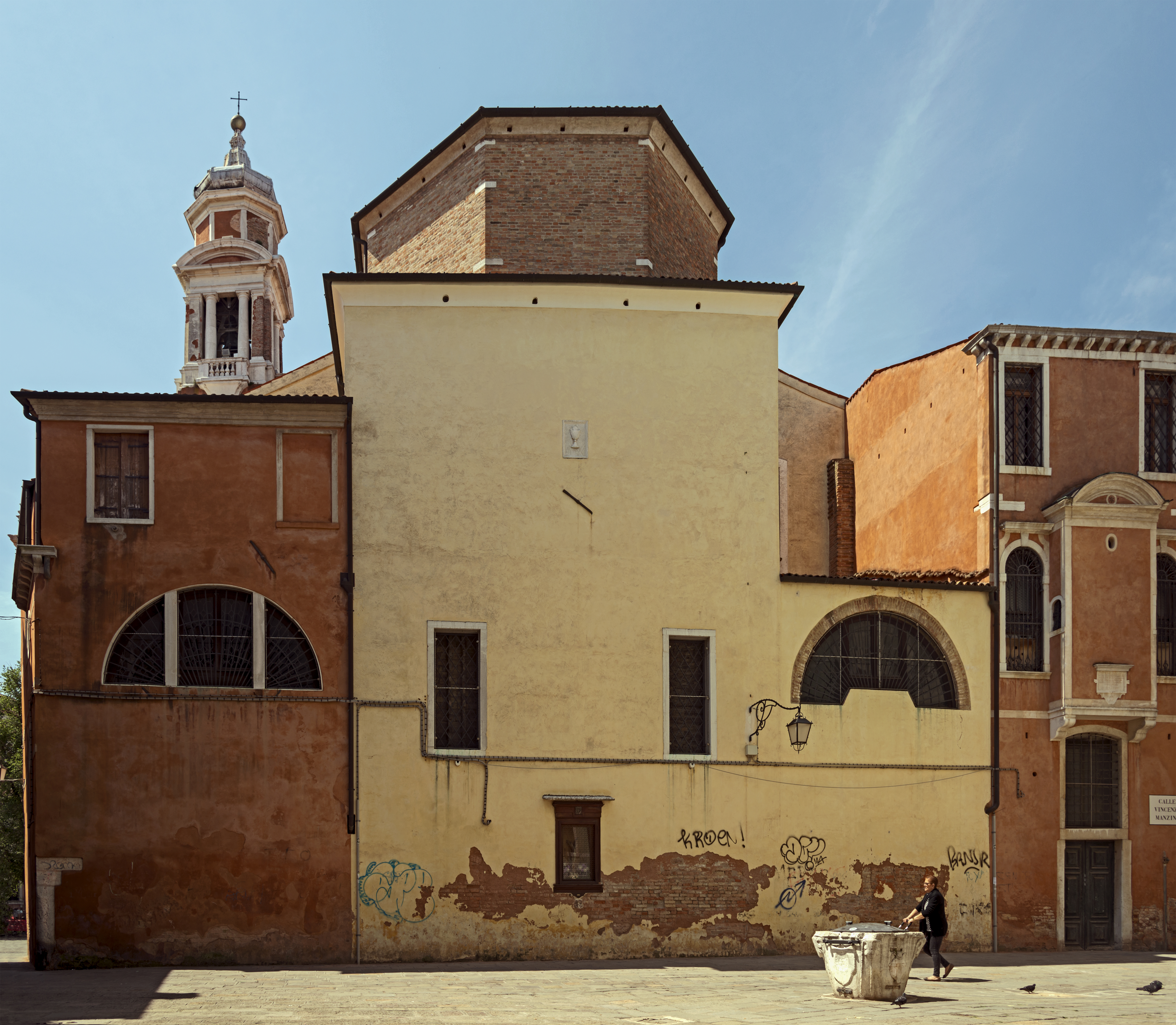
Apse on Campo dietro la chiesa

The Chiesa dei Santi Apostoli di Cristo (Church of the Holy Apostles of Christ), commonly called San Apostoli, is a 7th-century Roman Catholic church located in the Cannaregio sestiere of the Italian city of Venice. It is one of the oldest churches in the city and has undergone numerous changes since its foundation. The present building is the result of a major reconstruction project which was undertaken in 1575. The church is notable particularly for the Cornaro Chapel, an important example of Early Renaissance architecture, added by Mauro Codussi during the 1490s. The chapel is the burial place of several members of the powerful Cornaro family (Venetian: Corner). The church houses several works of art including pieces by Giambattista Tiepolo and Paolo Veronese.

== History ==
In the 7th century Venice was not yet a city, but a collection of small communities scattered throughout the lagoon. St Magnus (Italian: San Magno), the Bishop of Oderzo, came to the lagoon and founded eight churches. According to a legend recounted by the historian Flaminio Cornaro, St Magnus had a vision of the Twelve Apostles who commanded him to build a church on a site where he saw twelve cranes. This location, eventually to be in the sestiere of Cannaregio, became the site of the church of San Apostoli. The church stands on the Campo dei Santi Apostoli at the beginning of the Strada Nuova (New Road).

During the 1490s the Cappella Cornaro, built as a burial place for the wealthy Venetian Cornaro family, was added to the church. It is considered one of the most important Early Renaissance chapels in Venice. (Note: The other early Renaissance chapels in Venice are the Gussoni in San Lio, the Badoer Giustinian in San Francesco della Vigna, and the Martini in San Giobbe) It is unknown exactly who designed the chapel, although it is most often attributed to the architect Mauro Codussi. (Note: The other possible candidate is Pietro Lombardo) At the same time a porch was added to the front of the church and a sacristy was built. These alterations were also overseen by Codussi.

In the middle of the 16th century the church briefly housed the Catecumeni, a Venetian fraternity for those wishing to convert to Christianity, before they established a permanent home at San Gregorio in 1571. Shortly after this, in 1575, the church was completely rebuilt. Only parts of the earlier structure were retained, including some frescos and the Cornaro Chapel.

During the early 18th century, Andrea Tirali added detailing, including the onion dome, to the campanile which itself had been a late 17th-century addition.

== Interior ==
The church retains its 16th century layout: a single nave supported by two rows of columns. One chapel has the funeral monument of Count Giuseppe Mangilli, designed by Luigi Trezza with bust by Angelo Pizzi. The main altarpiece is a Custodian Angel by Bernardo Strozzi.

=== Cornaro Chapel ===
The chapel is the burial place of several members of the Cornaro family, including Giorgio Cornaro and his sister Catherine Cornaro the Queen of Cyprus (since removed to the church of San Salvadore elsewhere in Venice), The charitable organisation Save Venice funded the restoration of the chapel, including the relief carvings. The main altar of this chapel was the Last Communion of St Lucy (1747–48) by Tiepolo.

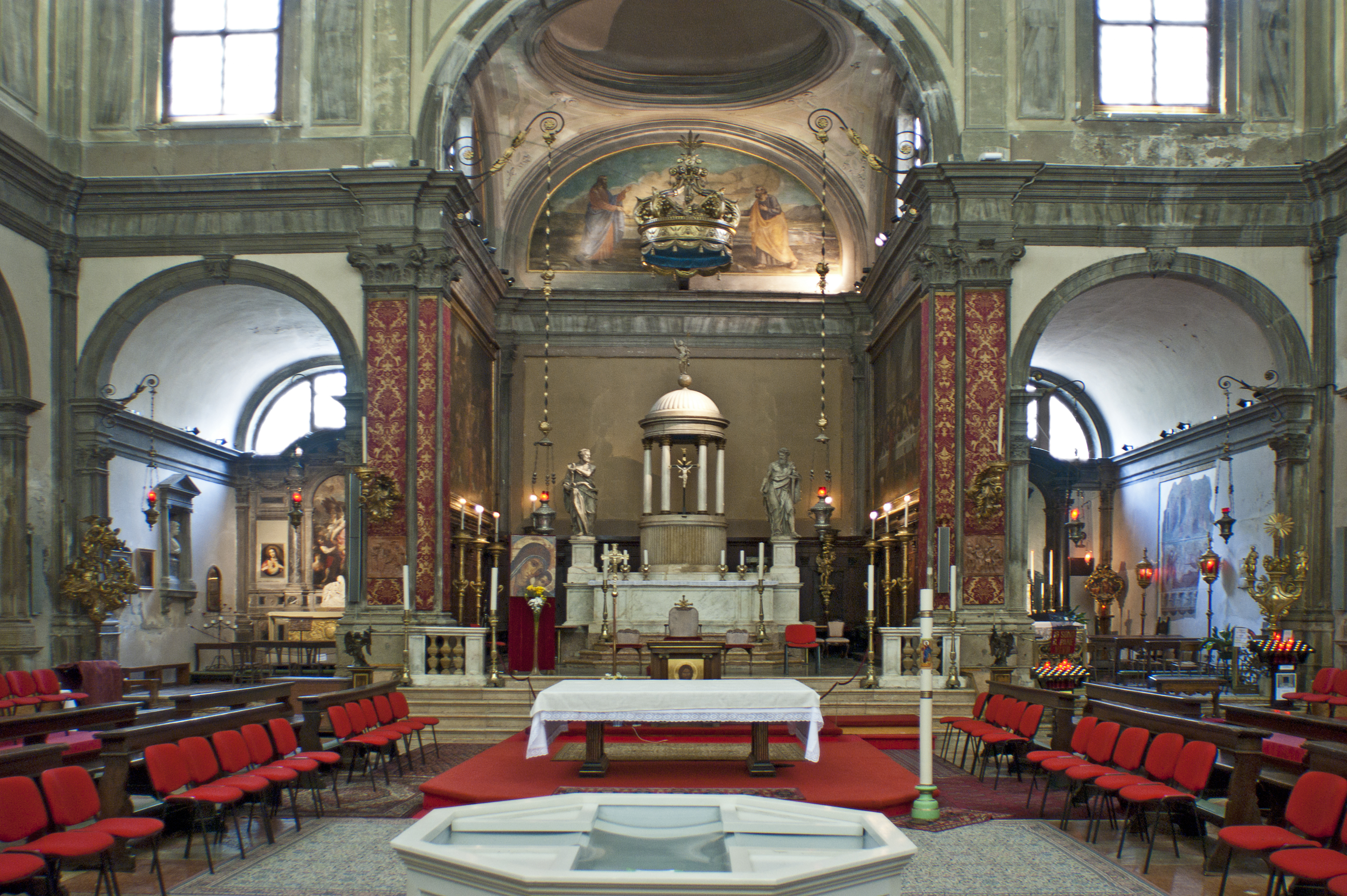
Interior

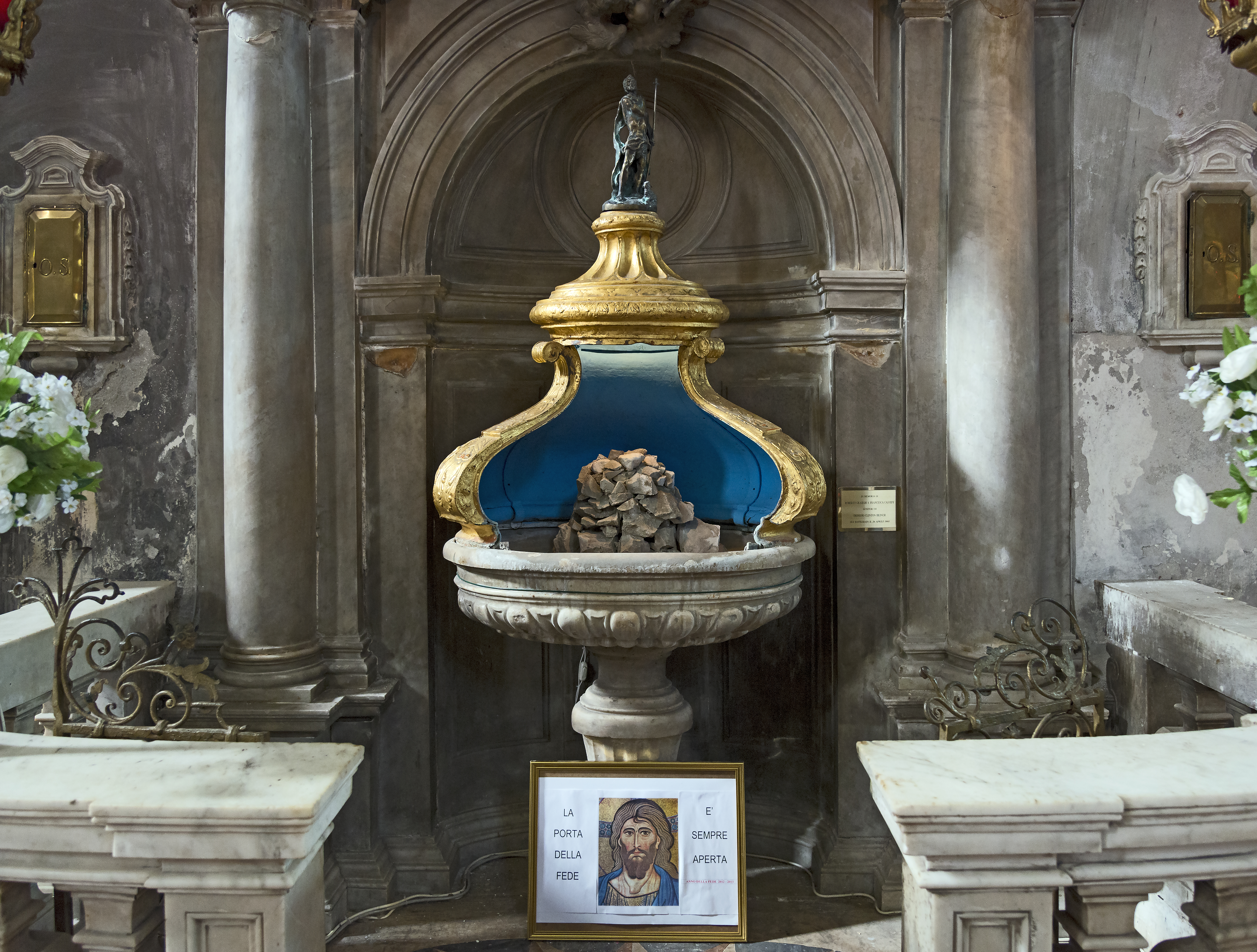
Font

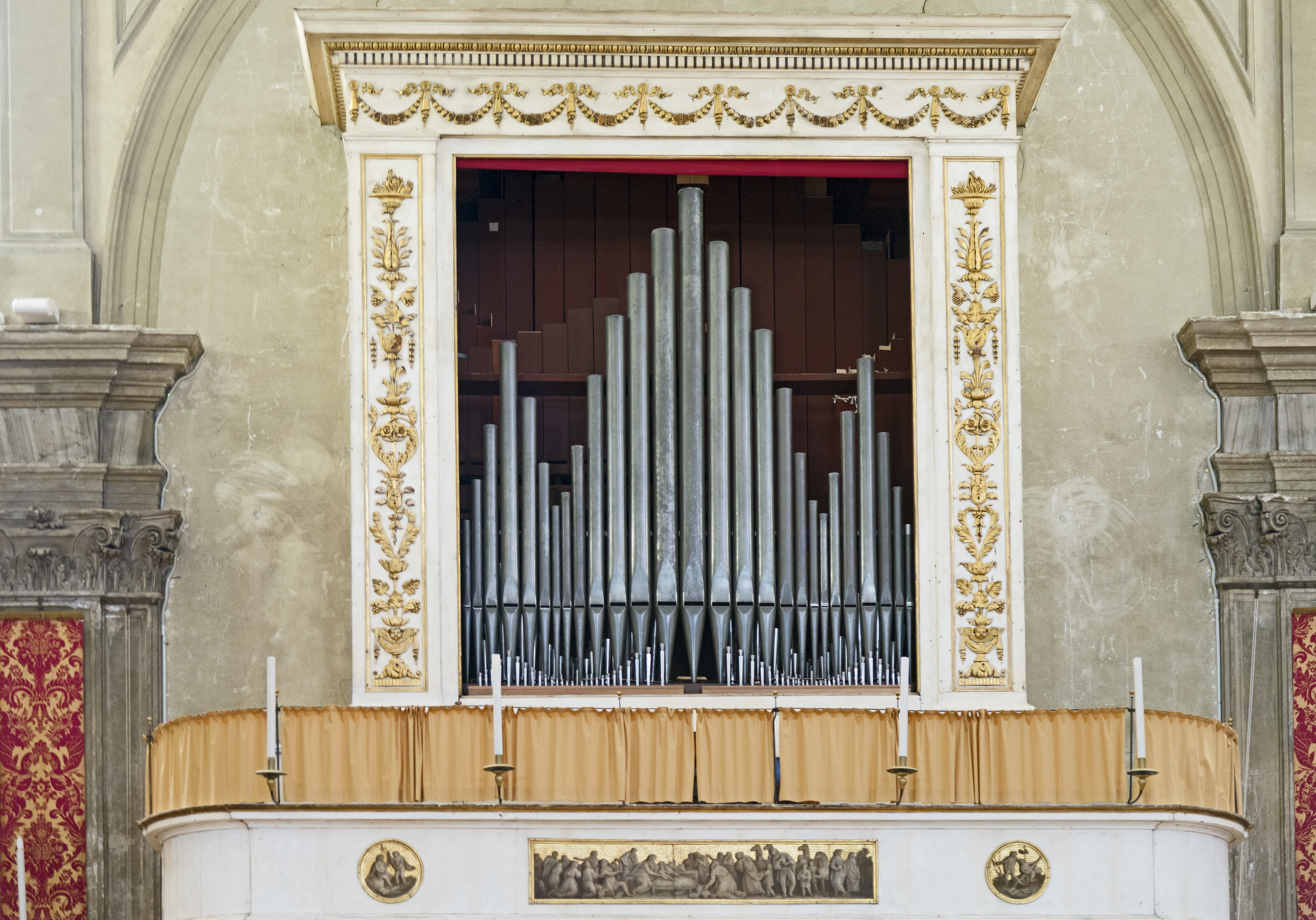
Organ

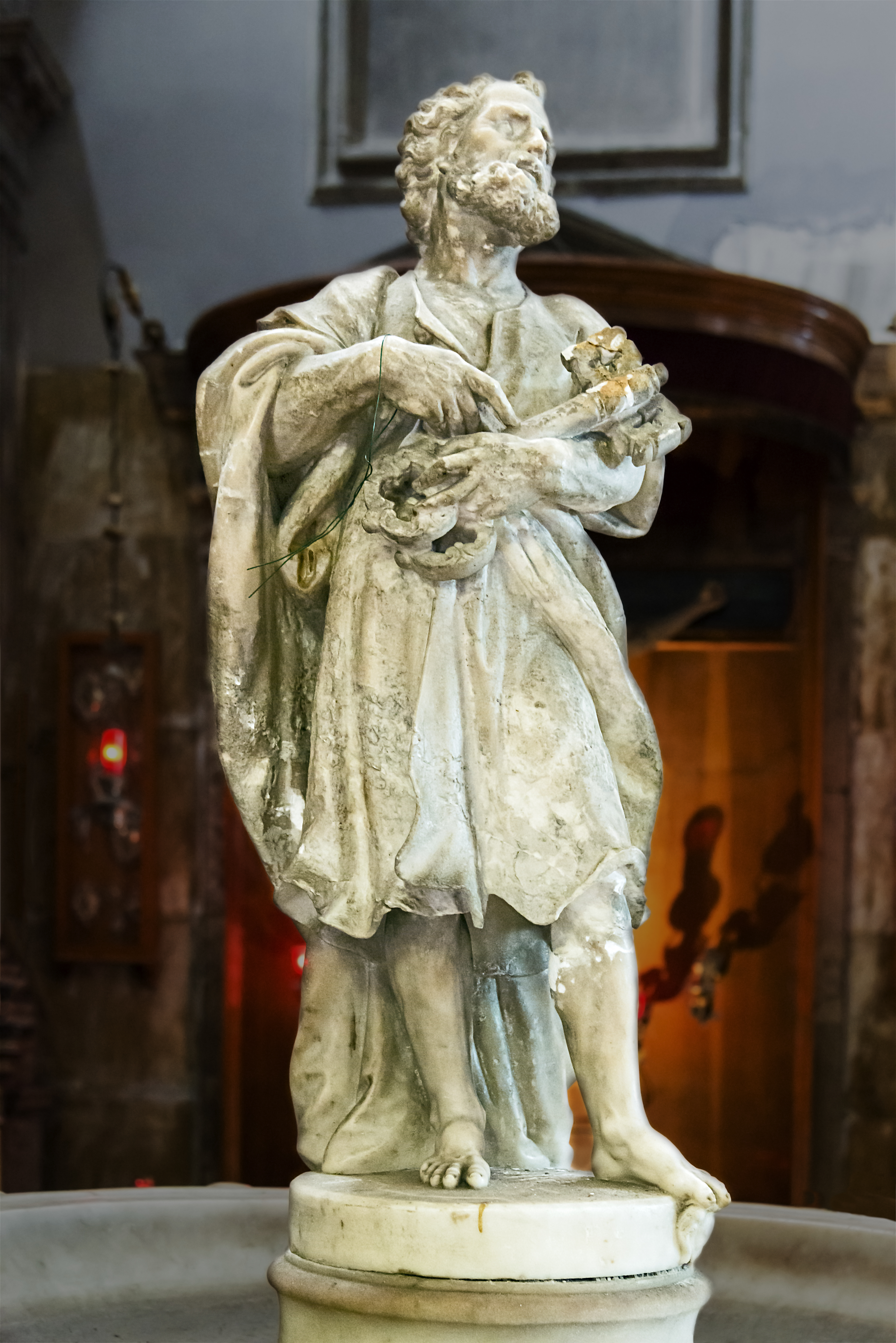
St Peter (Heinrich Meyring)

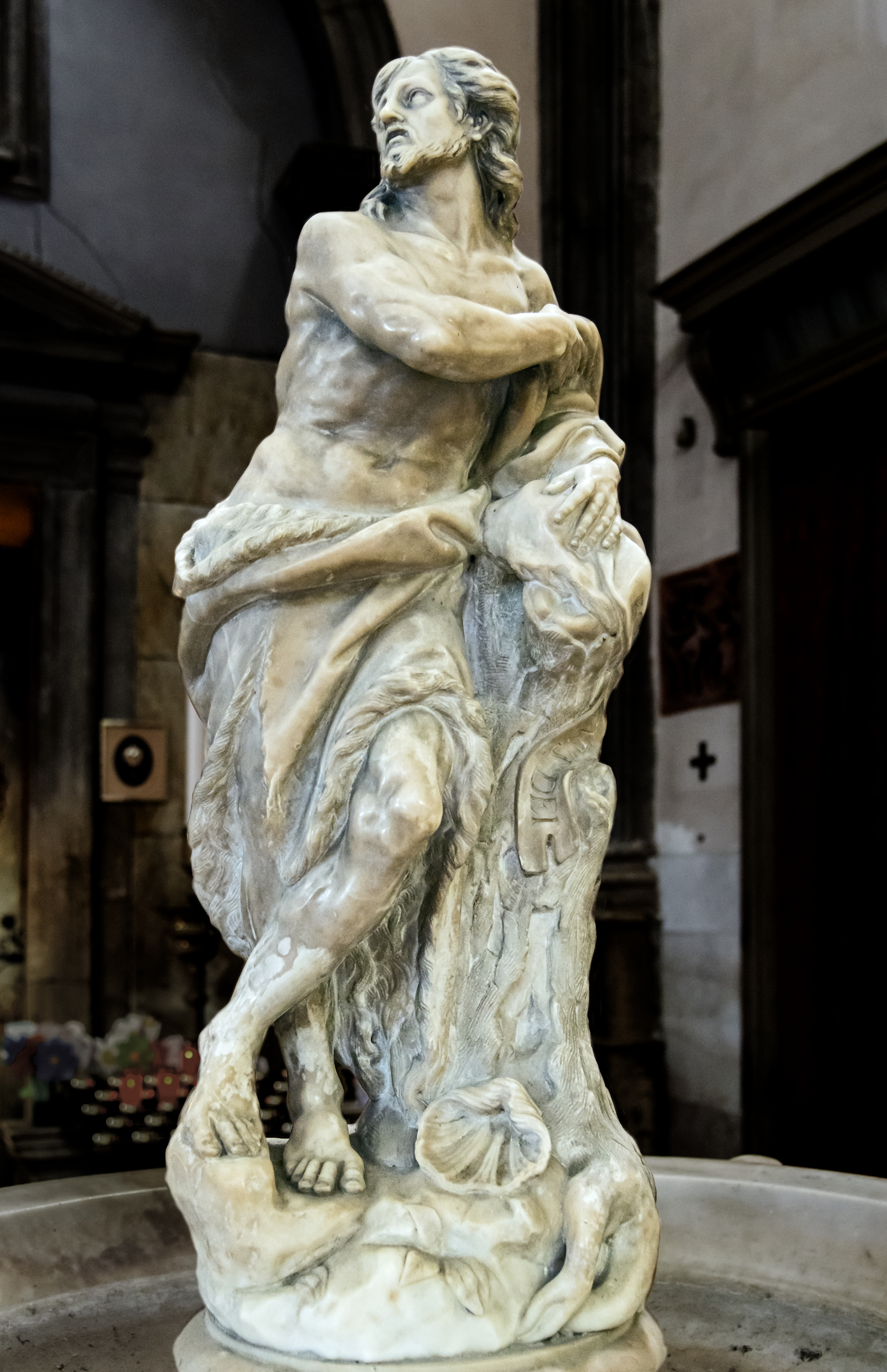
John the Baptist (Giacomo Piazzetta)

=== Art ===
The church contains a number of paintings, including:

- Paolo Veronese, Gathering of Manna, 1580–85.
- Giovanni Contarini, Birth of the Virgin, 1599
- Cesare da Conegliano, Last Supper, 1583
- Fabio Canal, Communion of the Apostles and Exaltation of the Eucharist, 17th century
- Sebastiano Santi, Christ between the Apostles, 1828
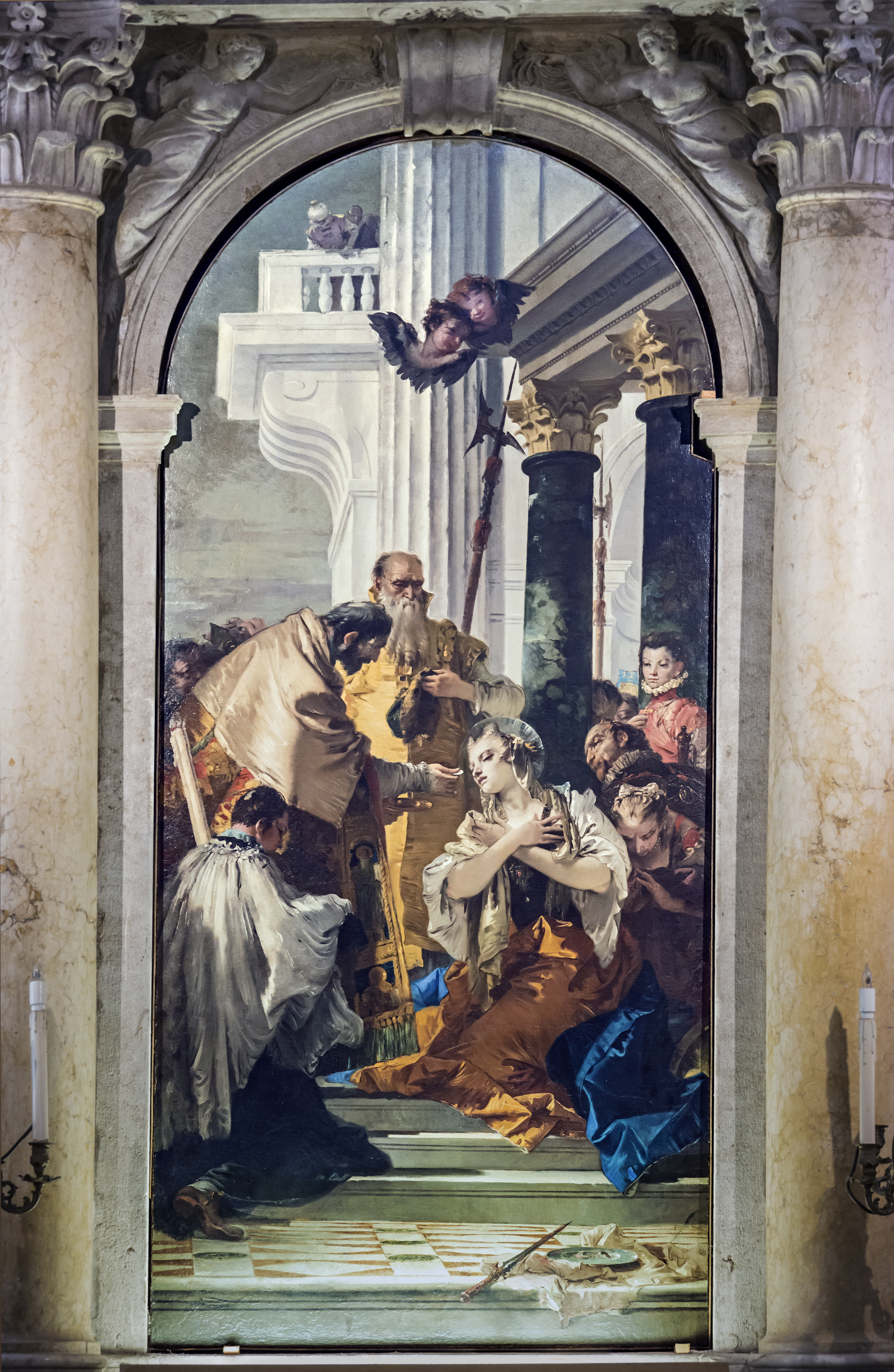
Last Communion of St Lucy (Giambattista Tiepolo)

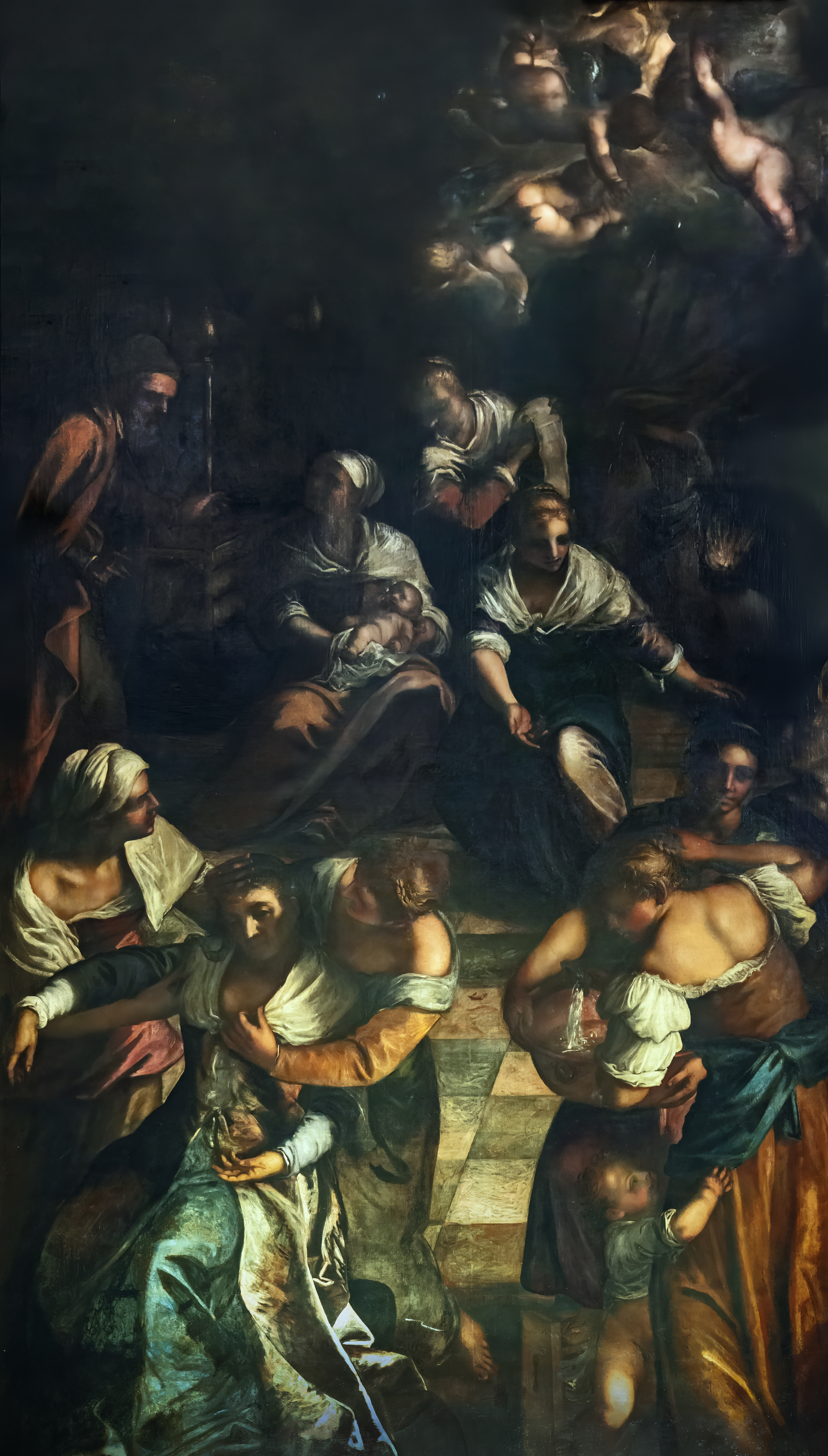
Birth of the Virgin, 1599 (Giovanni Contarini)

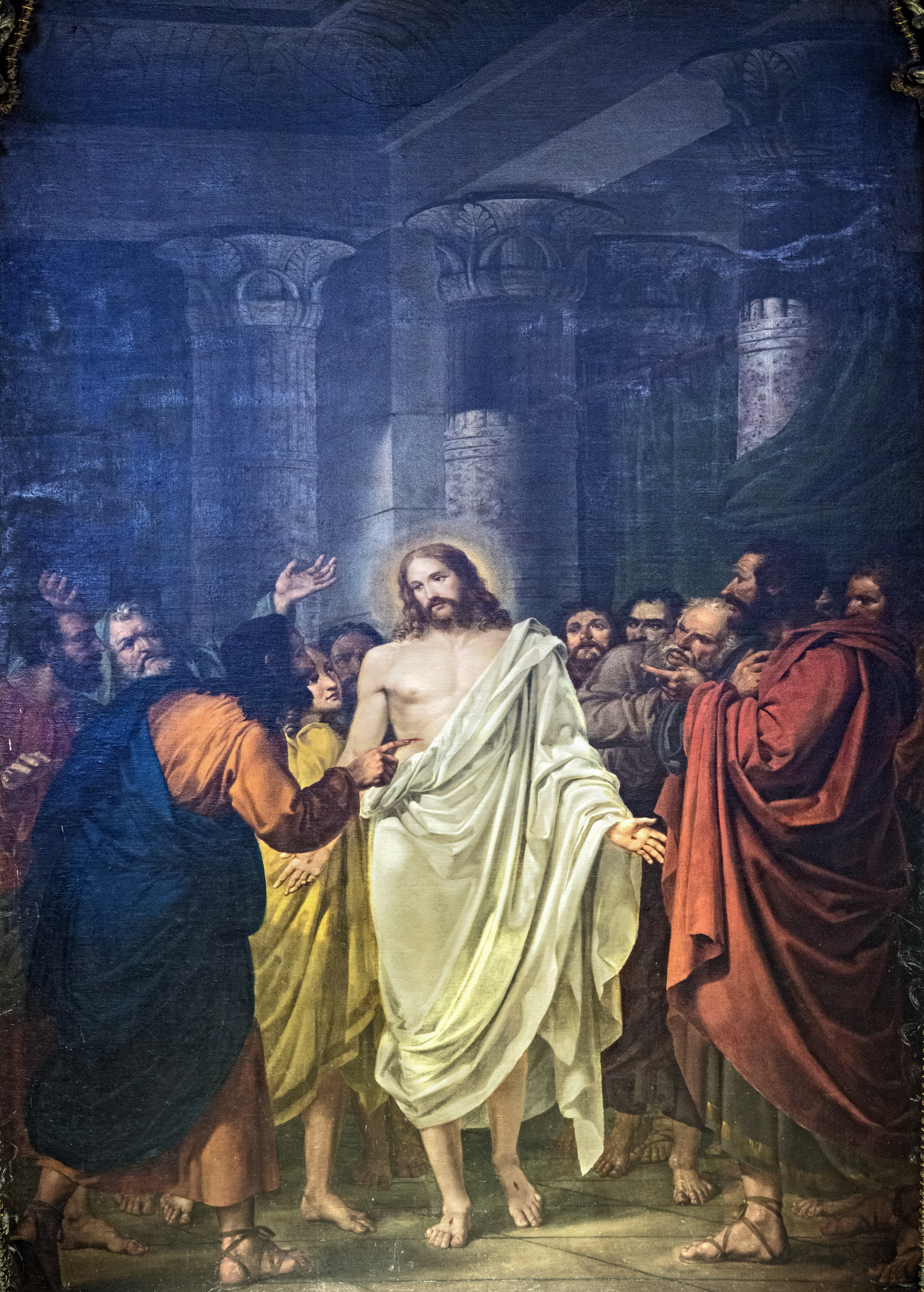
Christ between the Apostles, 1828 (Sebastiano Santi)

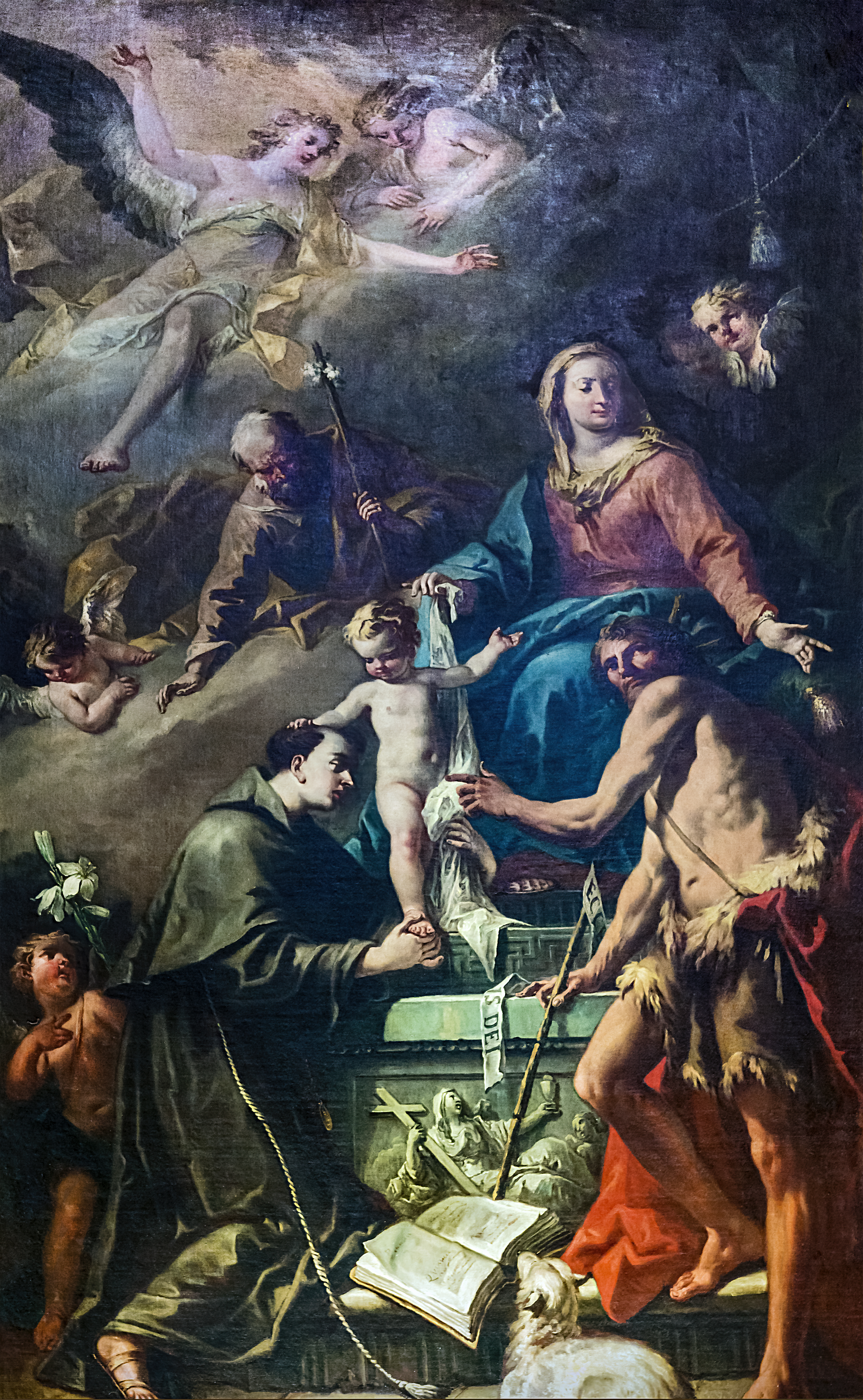
The Virgin and Child, St Joseph, St John the Baptist and St Anthony of Padua (Gaspare Diziani)

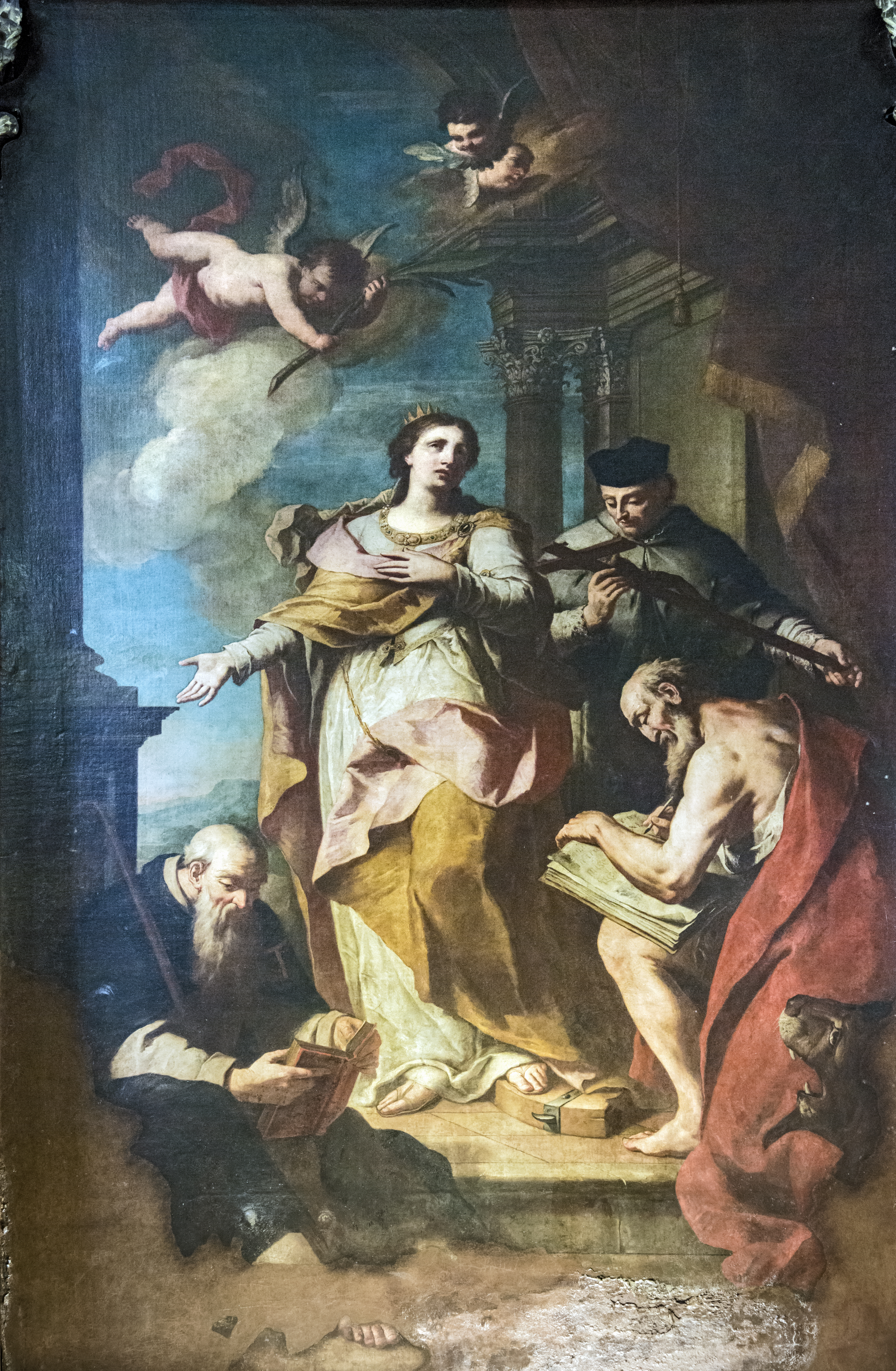
St Catherine of Alexandria, St Anthony Abbot, St Jerome and St John of Nepomuk (Domenico Maggiotto)

Ceiling paintings by Fabio Canale

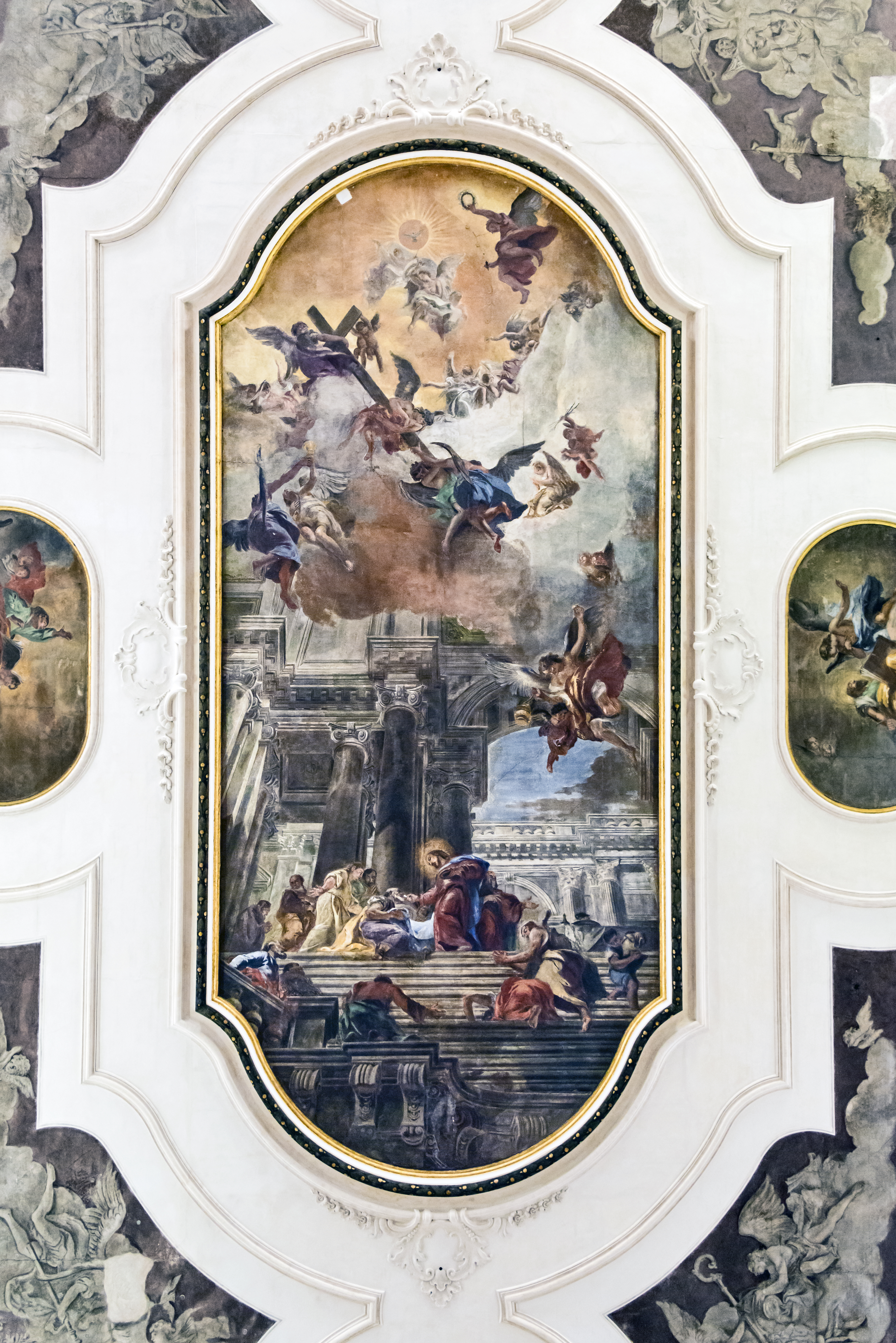
Communion of the Apostles and Exaltation of the Eucharist

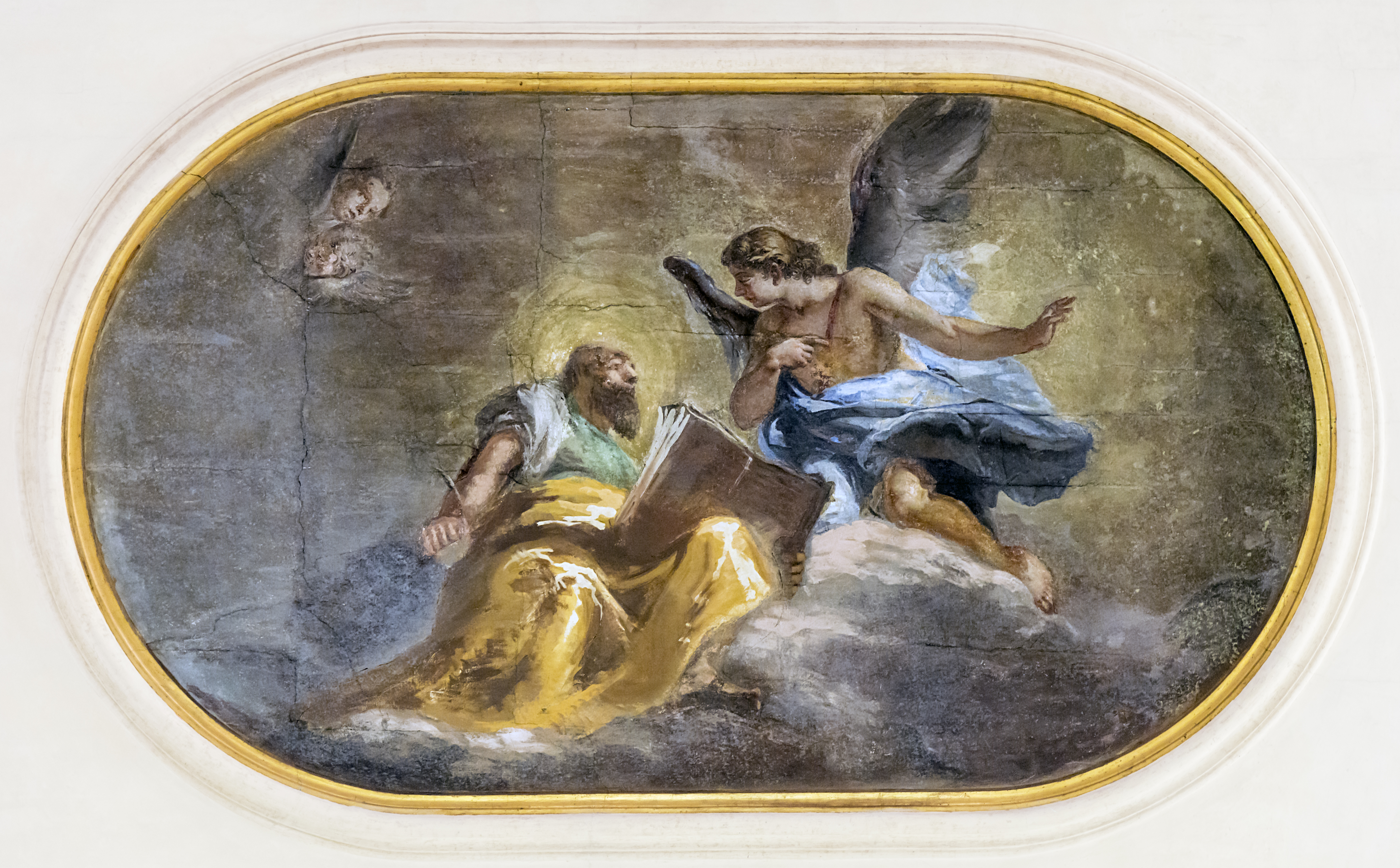
St Matthew

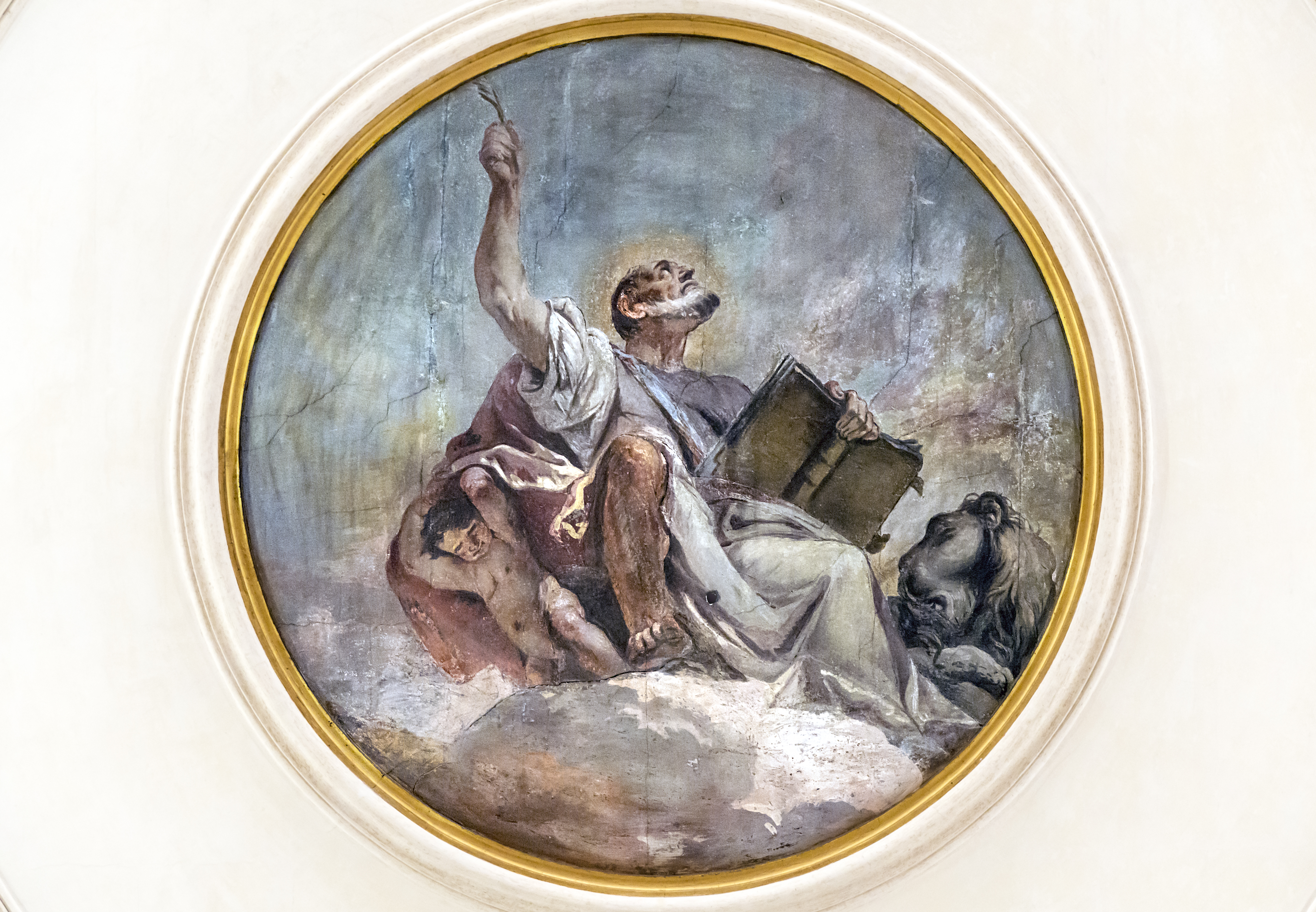
St Mark

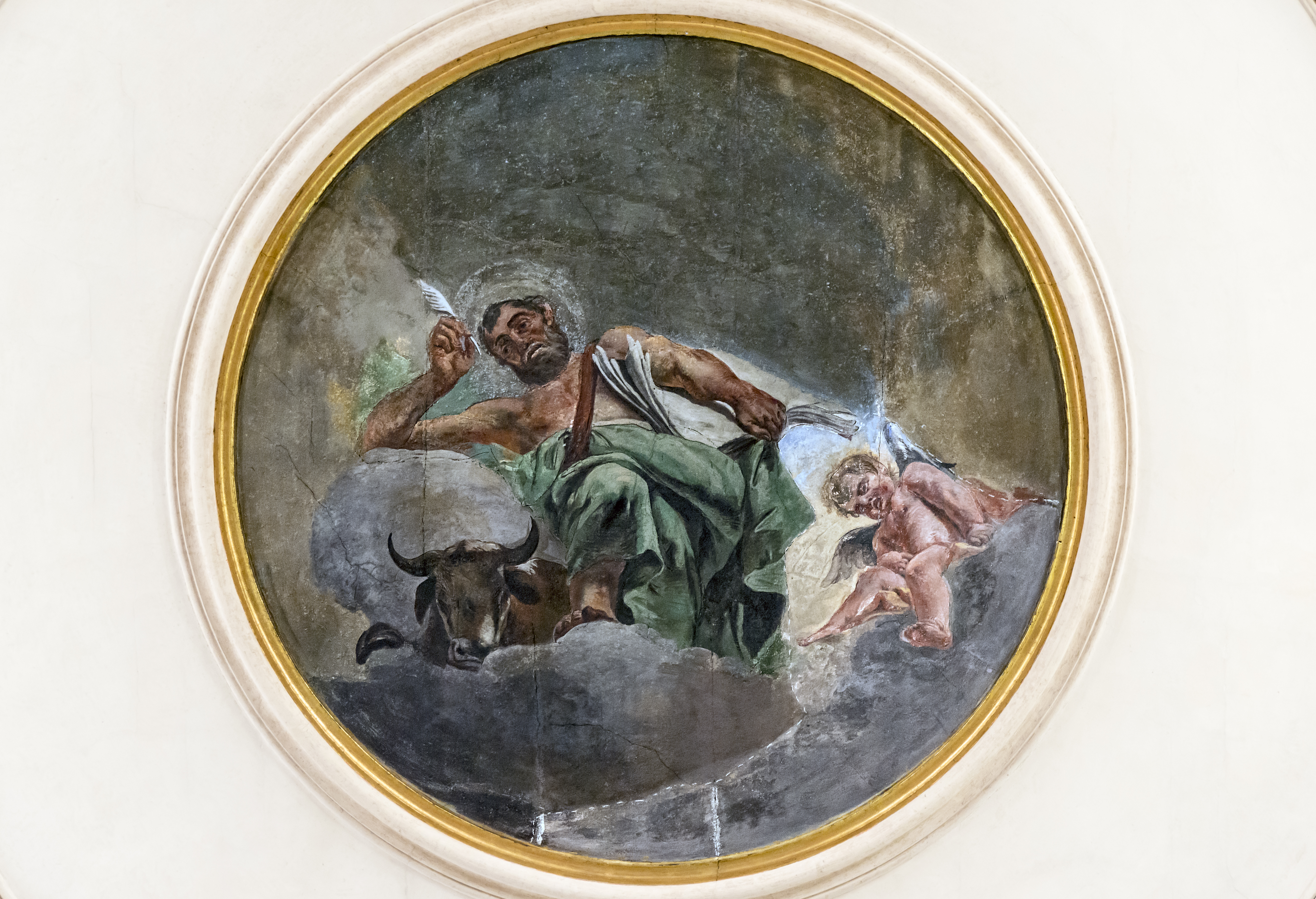
St Luke

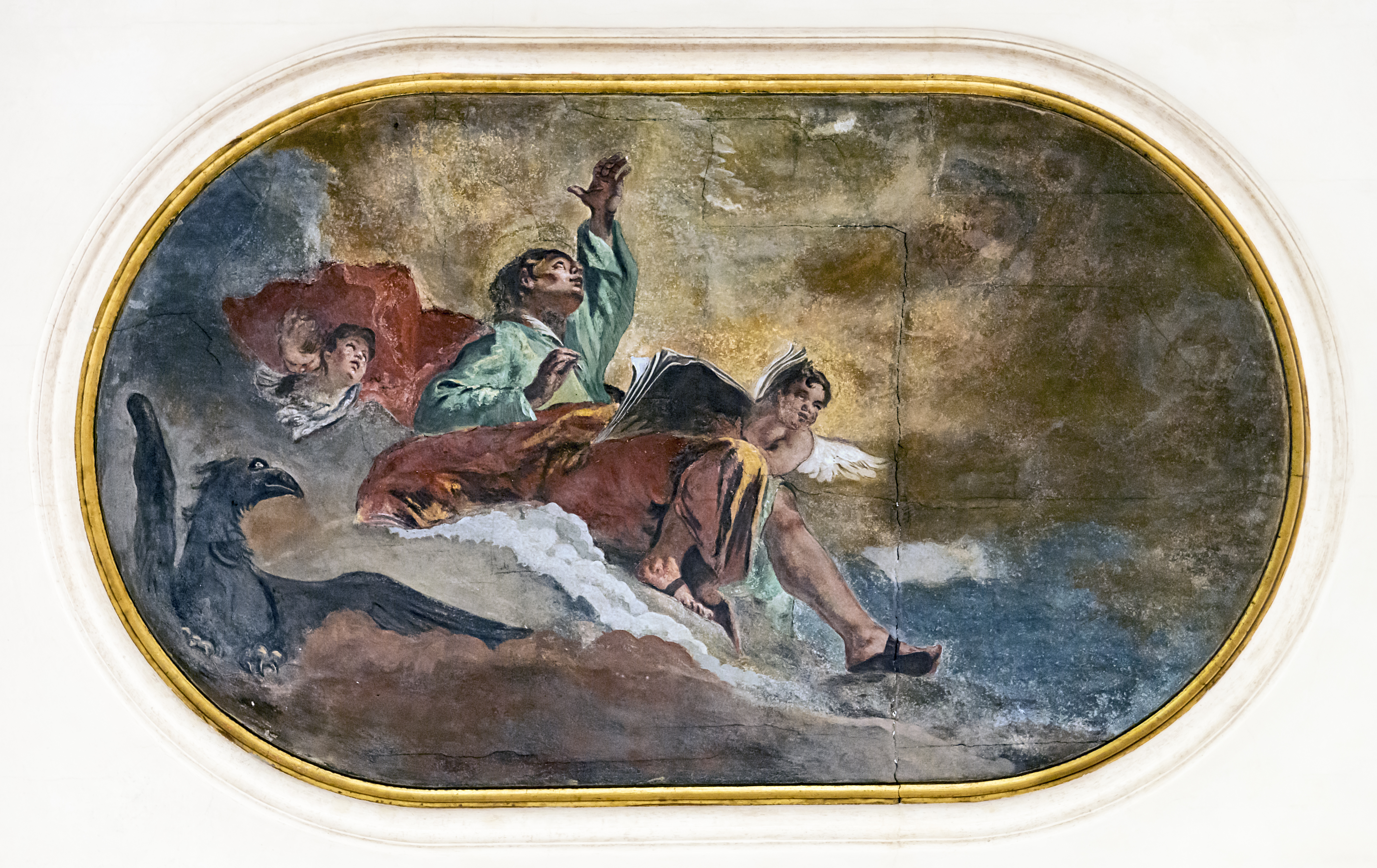
St John
