= San Giovanni Nuovo, Venice =

Church building in Venice, Italy

San Giovanni Nuovo
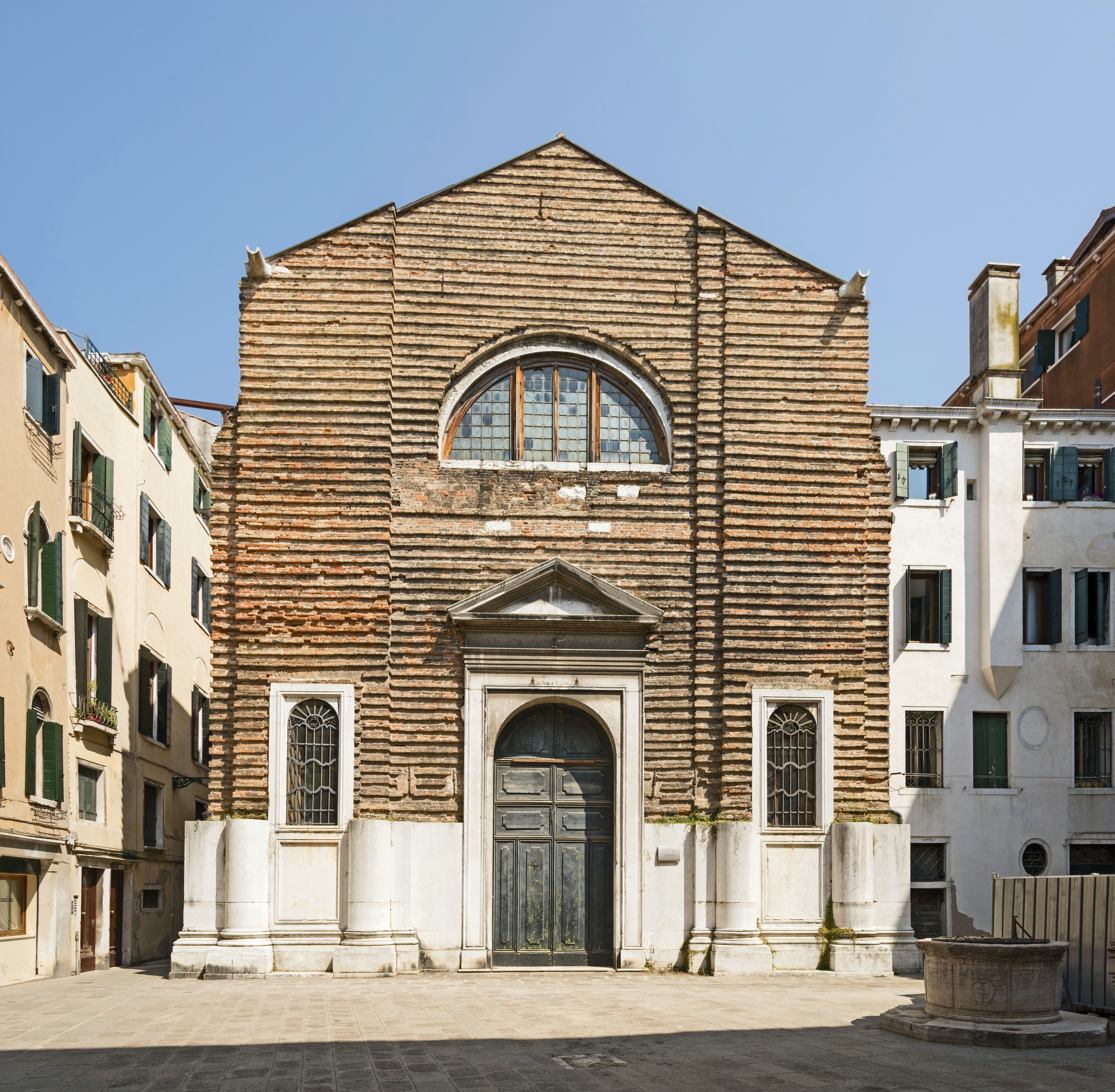
- San Giovanni Nuovo façade

- Location within Venice Location within Italy

Religion
- Affiliation: Roman Catholic
- Province: Venice

Location
- Location: Venice, Italy
- Interactive map of San Giovanni Nuovo
- Coordinates: 45°26′08.52″N 12°20′29.76″E

Architecture
- Completed: 10th century

San Giovanni Nuovo (also known as San Zan Novo or San Zaninovo) is a Roman Catholic church in the campo of the same name, in the sestiere of Castello, Venice, Italy.

== History ==
A church at the site was present by the 10th century, but the façade, which remains mostly incomplete, was rebuilt in 1762 using designs by Matteo Lucchesi.

The interior has a nave defined by Corinthian columns. There are two lateral chapels. The main altar has a canvas depicting St John Evangelist Martyred by boiling in cauldron of oil by Francesco Maggiotto. It is flanked by two smaller paintings, a Sacrifice of Abraham and of Melchisedech, painted by Fabio Canal. In the second lateral chapel is a 14th-century polychrome wood crucifix. The bell-tower dates from the earlier church.

== Bibliography ==
- Giulio Lorenzetti, Venezia e il suo estuario, ristampa 1974, Edizioni Lint Trieste, pag. 320.
- Derived from Italian Wikipedia entry.
