= San Luca, Venice =

Church building in Venice, Italy

San Luca
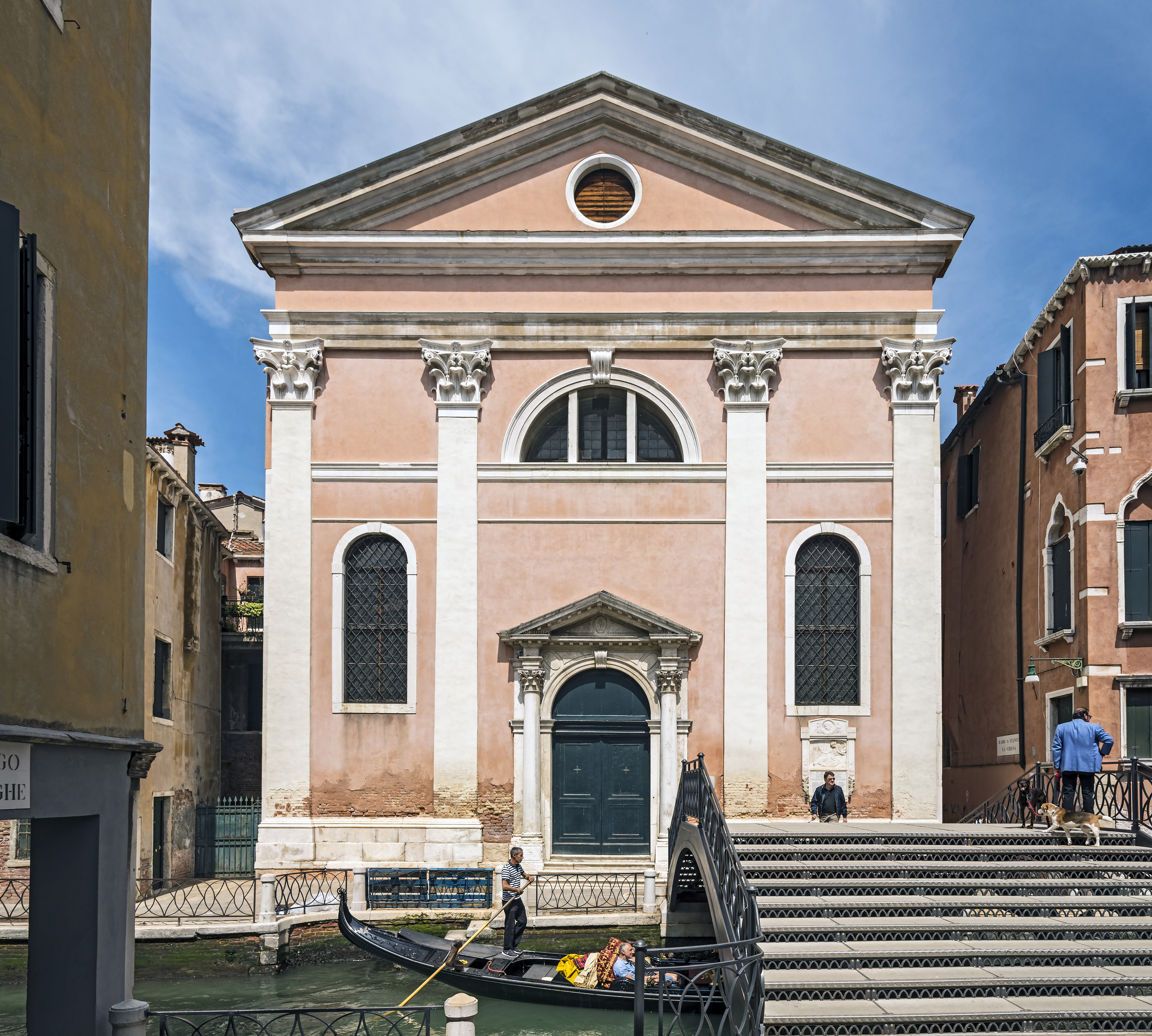
- San Luca in Venice

- Location within Venice Location within Italy

Religion
- Affiliation: Roman Catholic
- Province: Venice

Location
- Location: Venice, Italy
- Interactive map of San Luca
- Coordinates: 45°26′09″N 12°20′01″E

Architecture
- Completed: 11th century

The church of San Luca Evangelista is a church in the sestiere of San Marco in Venice, Italy.

A parish church stood at the site since the 11th century, patronized by the patrician Dandolo and Pizzamano families. Restored over the centuries, it underwent major reconstruction in the early 1600s, and was reconsecrated in 1617. The facade is simple, but the interior has a rich decoration. The walls and the ceiling were frescoed by Sebastiano Santi. In the altar in the presbytery is an altarpiece depicting The Virgin appears to St. Luke as he writes the Gospel by Paolo Veronese. In the right lateral chapel is an altarpiece of Virgin and Saints by Palma il Giovane. In the second altar to the left, is a painting depicting Lorenzo Giustiniani, first Patriarch of Venice, defeating the plague and distributing alms by Carlo Loth. Pietro Aretino, Lodovico Dolce, and other men of letters are buried in San Luca.

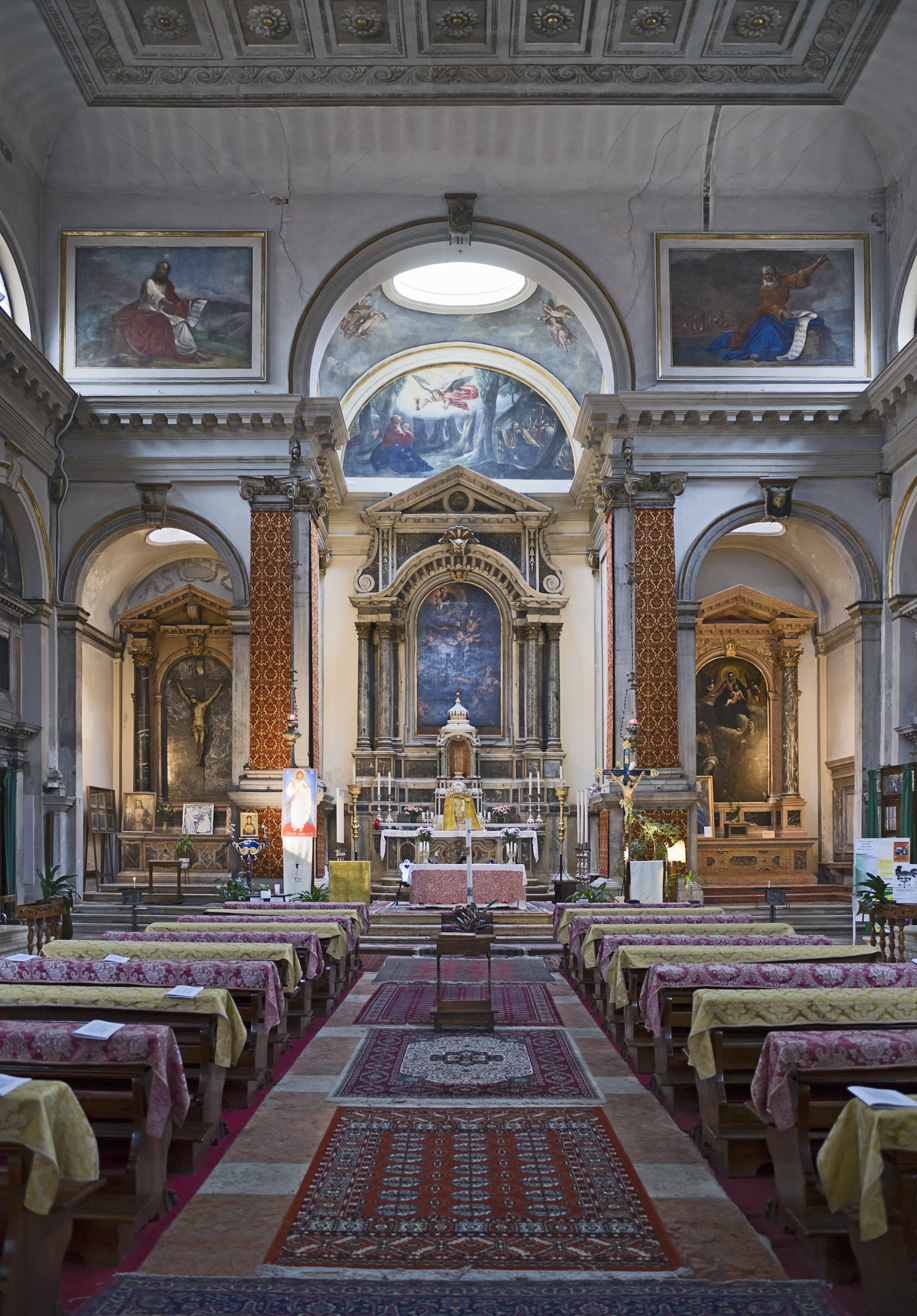
Interior towards main altar.

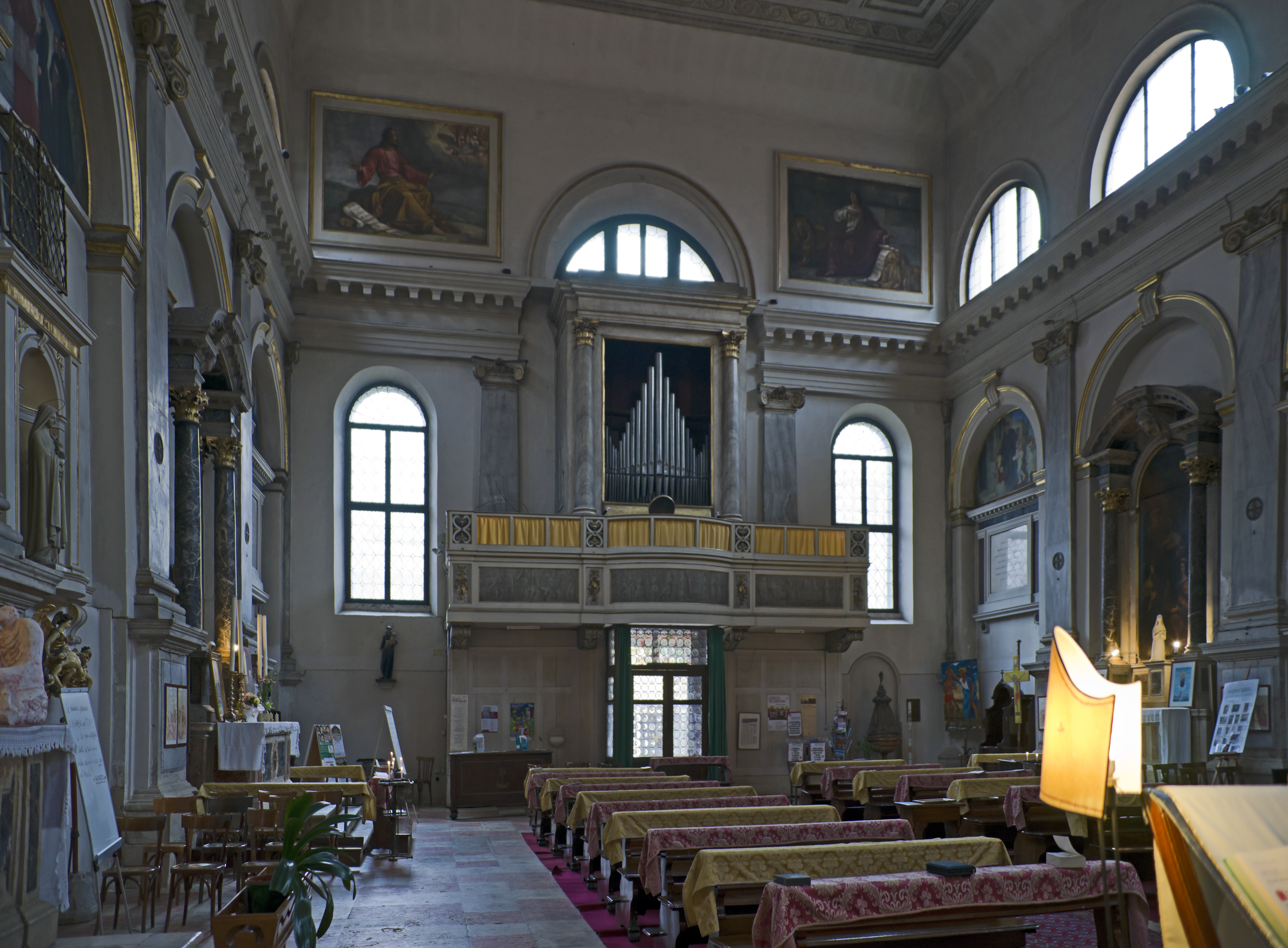
Interior towards entrance with organ.

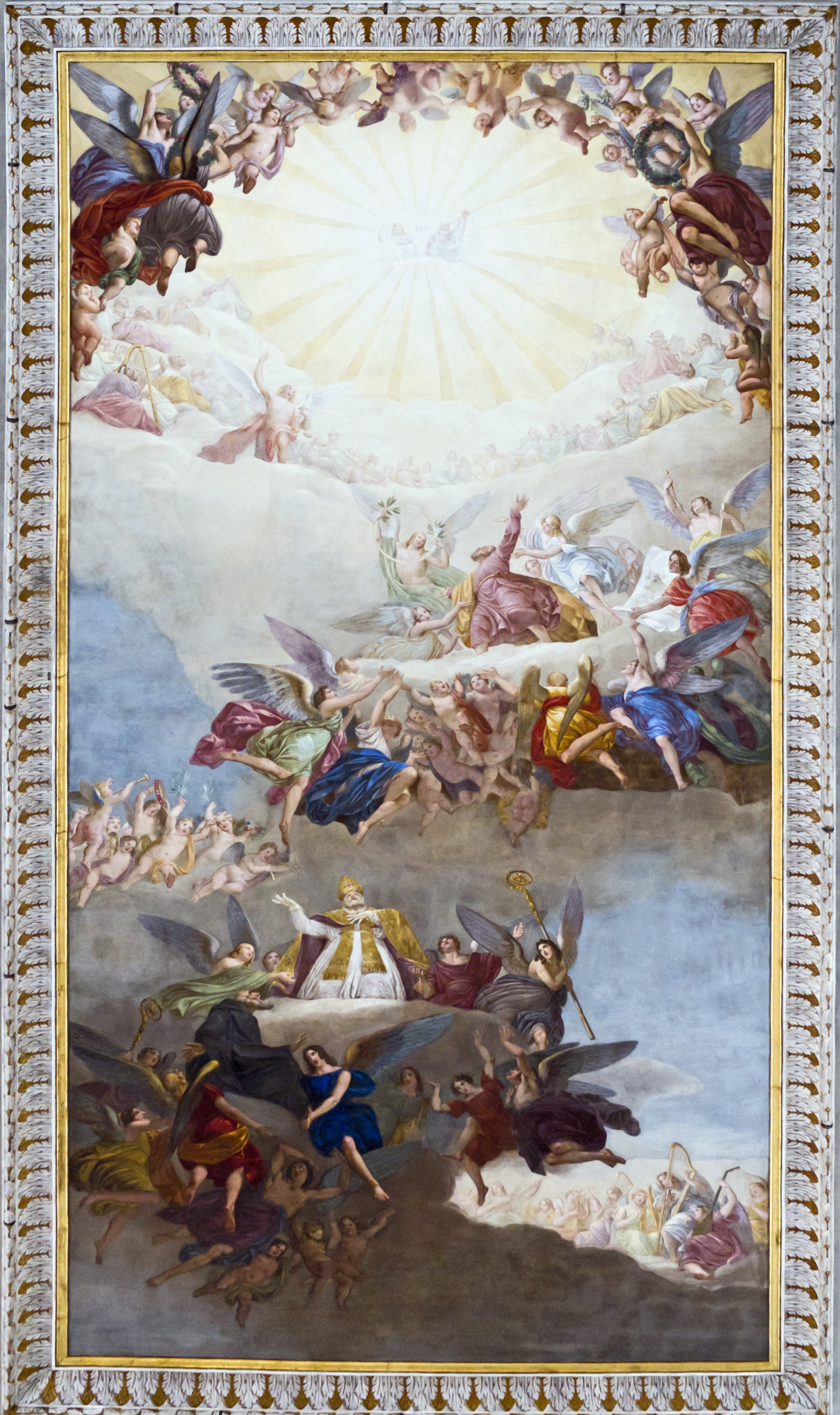
Ceiling fresco by Santi.

== Sources ==
- SIUSA (archivists) entry on Church of San Luca
