= Cesare da Conegliano =

Italian painter

Cesare da Conegliano (mid-16th century) was an Italian painter, known from a single work in Santi Apostoli, Venice.

== Biography ==
He was a contemporary of Titian. It is unclear how this painter was related to either Pordenone or his contemporary fellow townsman Francesco Beccaruzzi, who was a pupil of Pordenone. The relationship to this painter to Cima Da Conegliano, or his son Carlo, or the painter Ciro Da Conegliano is unclear.

== See also ==
- Ciro da Conegliano
