= Ciro da Conegliano =

Italian painter

Ciro da Conegliano (mid-16th century) was an Italian painter, pupil of Paolo Veronese, and active in Verona.

== Biography ==
He died at the age of 30. The relationship to this painter to Cima Da Conegliano, or his son Carlo, or the painter Cesare da Conegliano is unclear.
