= Fabio Canal =

Italian painter (1703–1767)

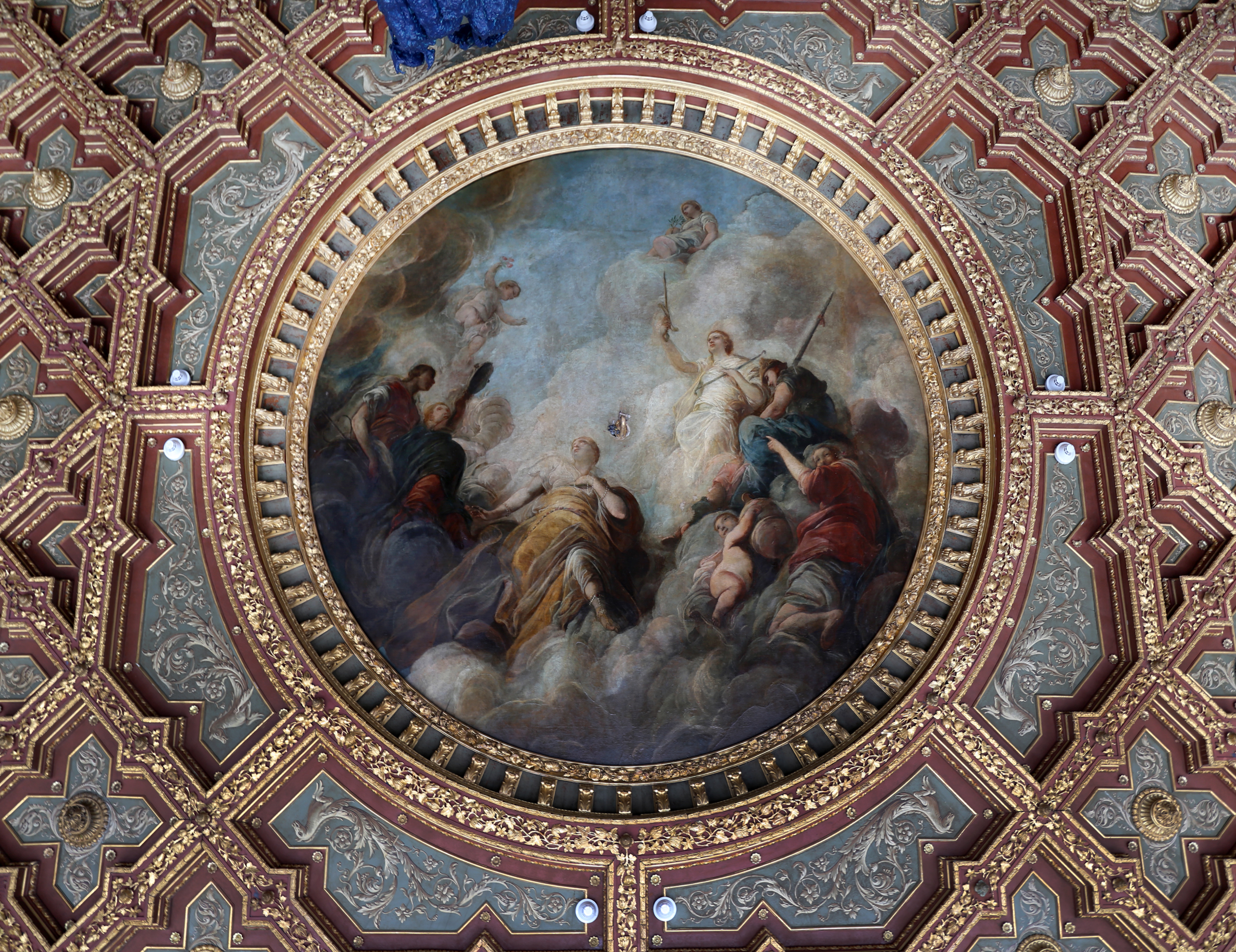
Palazzo Grassi (Venice) - Interior

Fabio Canal or Canale (1703 – 5 September 1767) was an Italian painter of the late Baroque era, active mainly depicting history and sacred subjects in his native Venice.

== Biography ==
He was a follower of Tiepolo. Among his works are the nave ceiling fresco (1744), depicting Communion of the Apostles and the Triumph of the Eucharist in the church of Santi Apostoli, Venice with quadrature by Pietro Gaspari; and paintings in the churches of San Giovanni Nuovo and San Martino, Venice. He also painted a salon ceiling with the Glory of the Mussato Family in the Palazzo Mussato, Padua. Along with Jacopo Guarana, he painted the caesars in the Villa Pisani at Stra.

His portrait, along with many of the artist of his time, was engraved by Alessandro Longhi. he was a founding member of the Academy of Fine Arts of Venice, joining the fraglia or guild of painters in 1740.

His son and early pupil Giovanni Battista Canal (1745–1825) was known for his speed in fresco painting.
