= Matteo Lucchesi =

Italian architect and engineer (1705–1776)

Matteo Lucchesi (1705–1776) was an Italian architect and Engineer, active mainly in his native Venice.

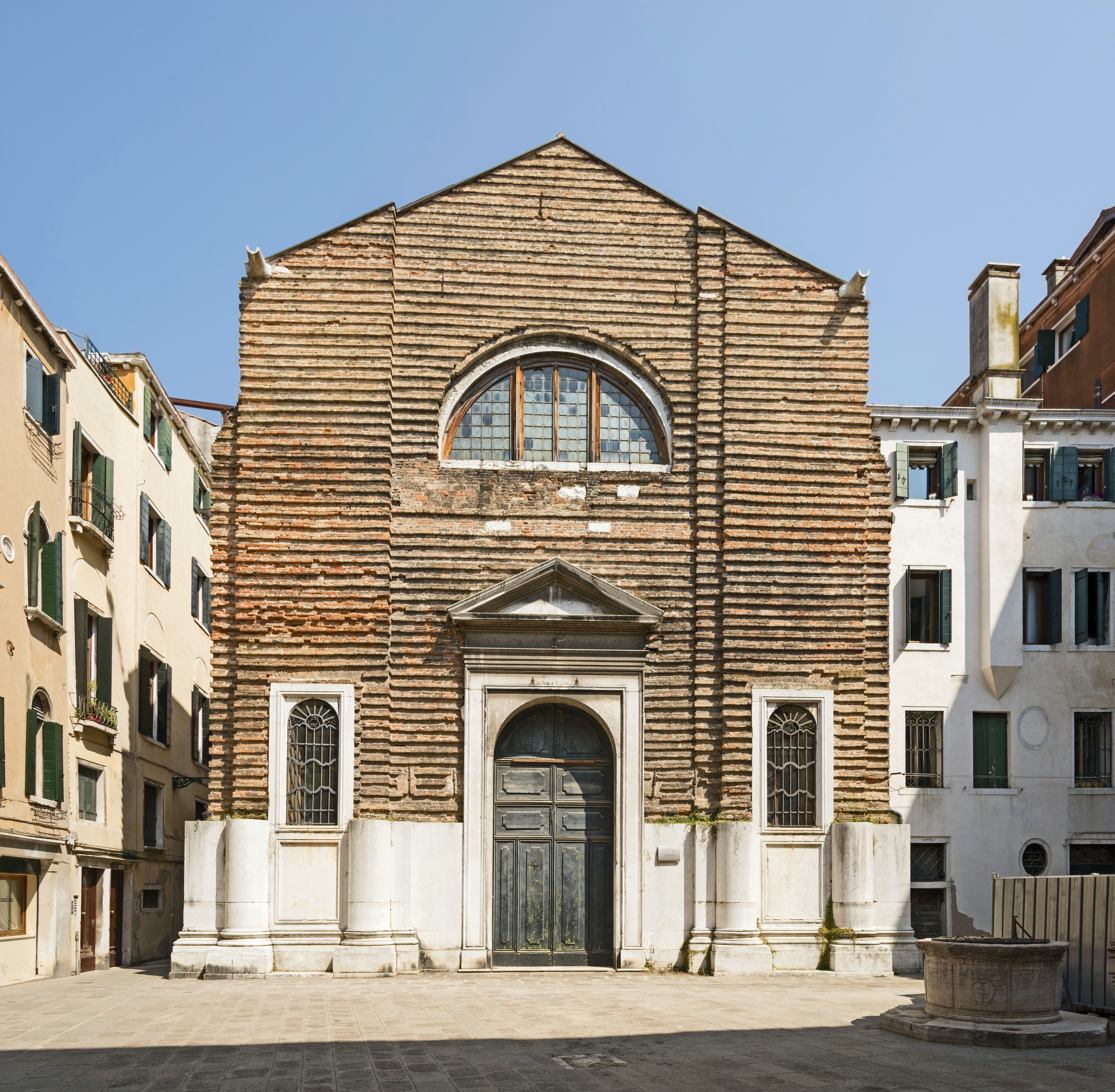
Church San Zaninovo

He learned mathematics and architecture from Tommaso Temanza. He was named by the Ducal Republic to be Magistrato delle Acque (Magistrate of Waterworks), an important post in the state. He designed the reconstruction of the church of San Giovanni Nuovo (San Zaninovo), built 1751–1762. He boasted that this church was the Redentore redento, meaning "redeemed redeemer" because it corrected the errors Lucchesi found in Palladio's church of Il Redentore. San Zaninovo's facade was never completed. Lucchesi also helped in reconstruction at the Ospedaletto. He also published works about artistic methods.

He also was an early mentor to his nephew, the famous engraver Giovanni Battista Piranesi.
