= Palazzo Mussato =

Building in Padua, Italy

Coordinates: 45.4063°N 11.8690°E

The Palazzo Mussato is an 18th-century palace located on Via Speroni Sperone in the city of Padua, region of Veneto, Italy. it is presently occupied by the middle school "Francesco Petrarca".

== History ==
A house on the site was once linked to Albertino Mussato, an orator and notary of the late 13th to 14th century. The present structure was rebuilt in the 18th century by the architect Girolamo Frigimelica Roberti. The rooms contain ceilings frescoed with mythologic and allegoric frescoes painted by Francesco Zugno and Fabio Canal.
