= Sebastiano Santi =

Italian painter

Sebastiano Santi (1788–1866) was an Italian painter, active both in oil and frescoes.

He was born in Murano and trained at the Academy of Fine Arts of Venice under Teodoro Matteini. His works are to be found in the Venetian churches. He painted the ceiling frescoes for the church of San Daniele, Padua.

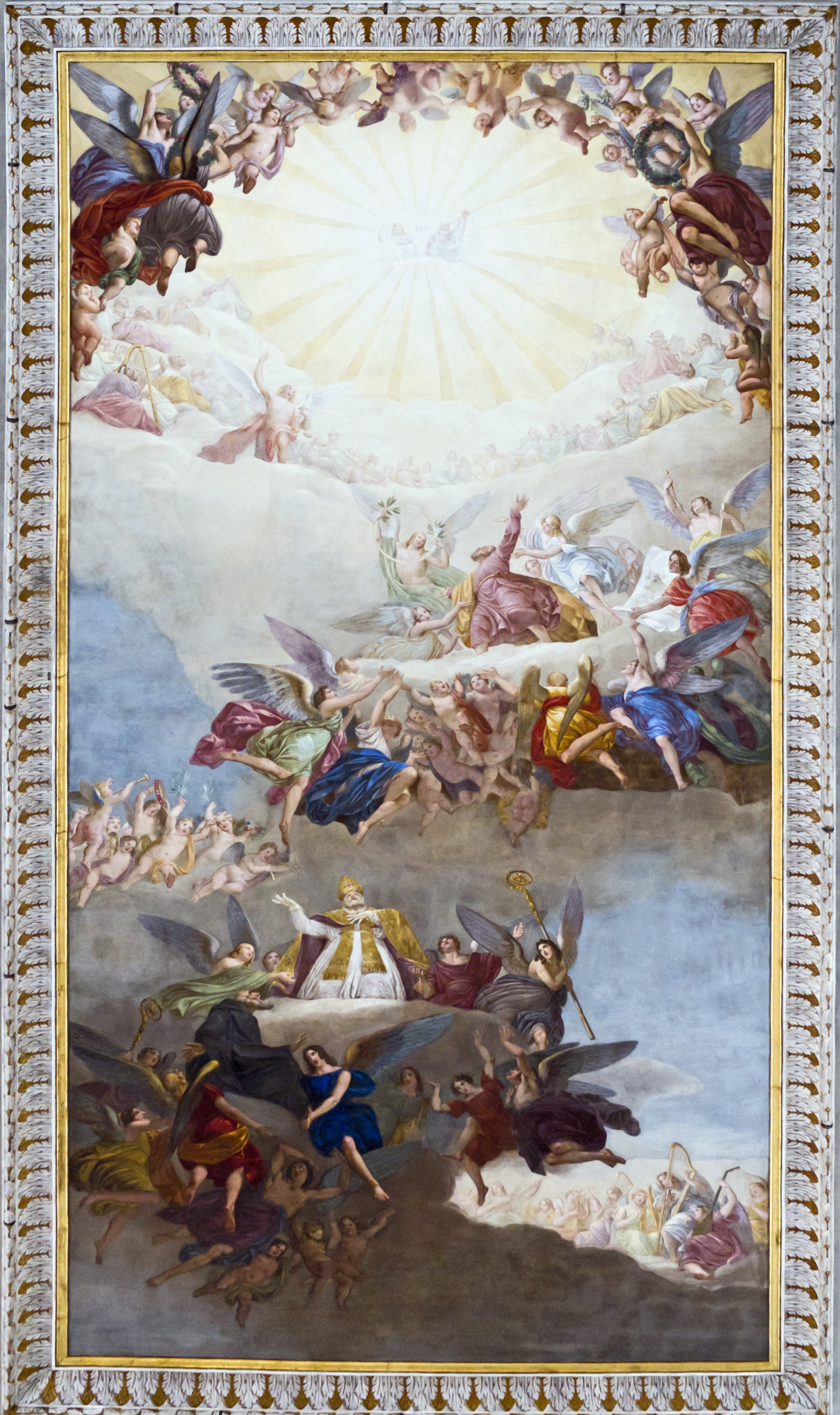
Ceiling from church of San Luca, Venice

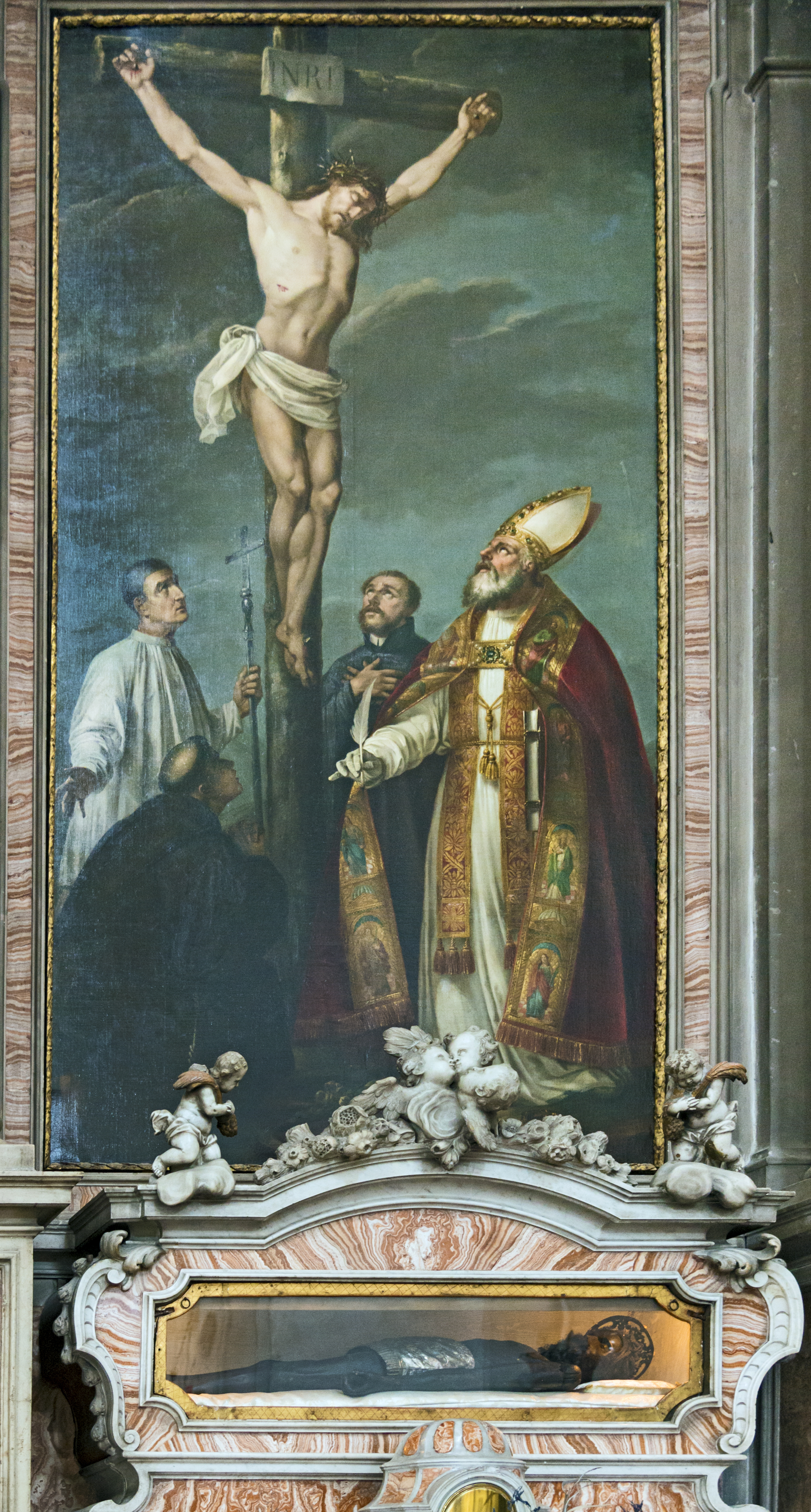
Christ crucified from the church of San Geremia (Venice)
