= San Daniele, Padua =

Church building in Padua, Italy

Coordinates: 45°24′03.78″N 11°52′34.36″E

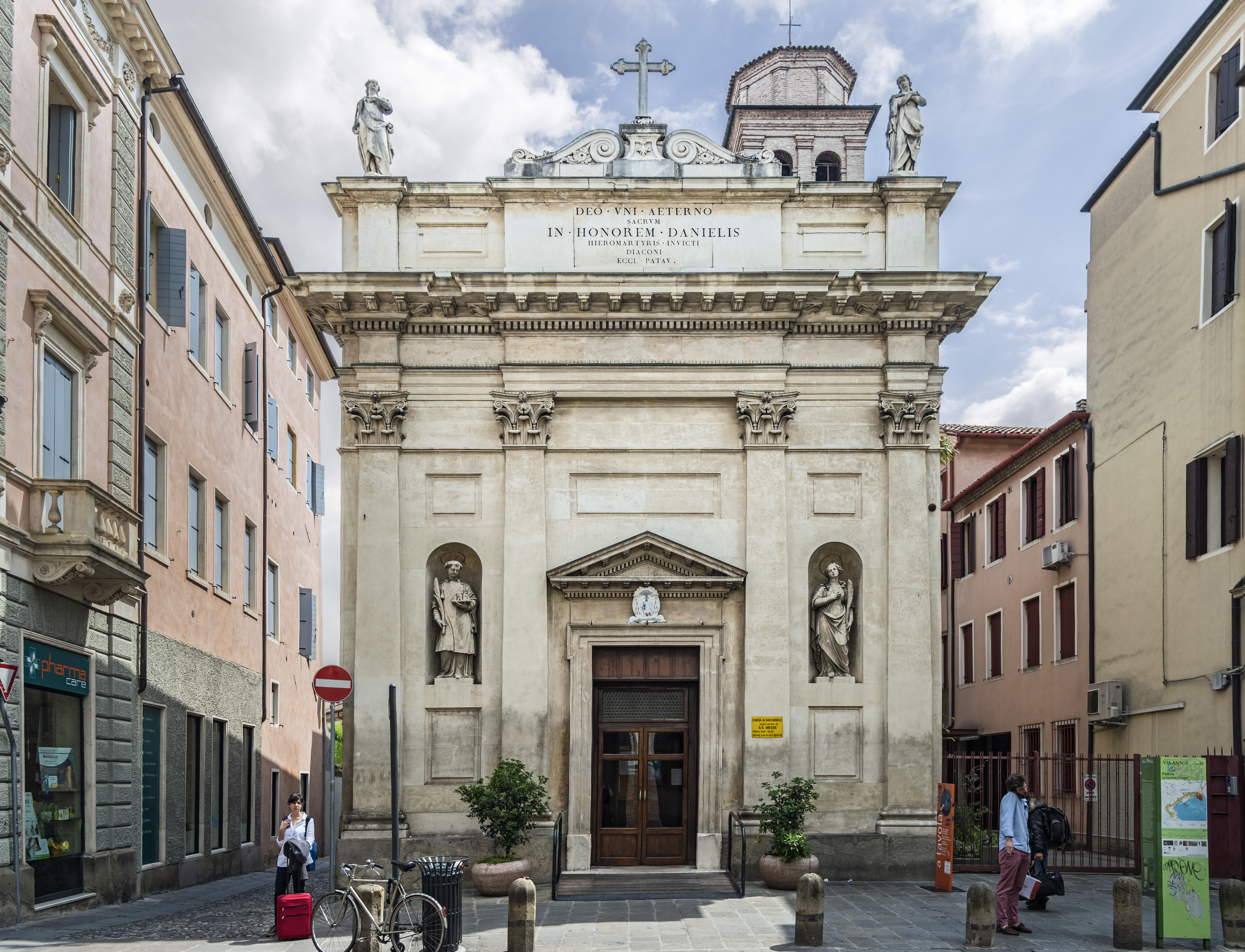
Facade of San Daniele

San Daniele is a Roman Catholic church and monastery in Padua, region of Veneto, Italy.

== History and description ==
The church and its adjacent monastery were built by 1076 by Benedictines affiliated with the Basilica of Santa Giustina di Padova. Legend holds that then Bishop Ulderico had organized a procession to transport the relics of St Daniel of Padua from the church of Santa Giustina to the cathedral, but upon arriving to this spot, the relics became too heavy to carry, and a darkness with thunder and lightning supervened, and the bishop made a promise to build here a church to the holy martyr. The saint is venerated as the deacon of Saint Prosdocimus, the first Bishop of Padua. San Daniele, sometimes labeled with the suffix "Levita", was said to have been a converted Jew who was martyred in the east in 168 A.D.

In 1771, the monastery was suppressed by the Republic of Venice, and transformed into a private residence. In 1948, Benedictine monks, exiled from a monastery in the former Yugoslavia, were housed in this monastery. The church is still consecrated; it was refurbished in a late-baroque style by the architect Francesco Muttoni. The facade and interior were extensively refurbished in the early 19th-century in a neoclassical fashion. The interior houses an altarpiece depicting the Birth of Jesus attributed to Palma il Giovane. In a 1795 guide, the first altarpiece on the left depicted a St Charles ministering to those afflicted with the plague by Giovanni Battista Bissoni. In addition, an altarpiece to the right had a canvas depicting a Crucifixion with Mary and St John the Baptist by Francesco Zanella.

The antique wooden choir is protected by a metal railing. To the right of the church is an elevated terrace with views of the town and surroundings.

The apse of the church still retains its circular apse partially derived from the previous Romanesque structure. The nave ceiling was frescoed in the 19th century by Sebastiano Santi, and depicts events related to St Daniele.

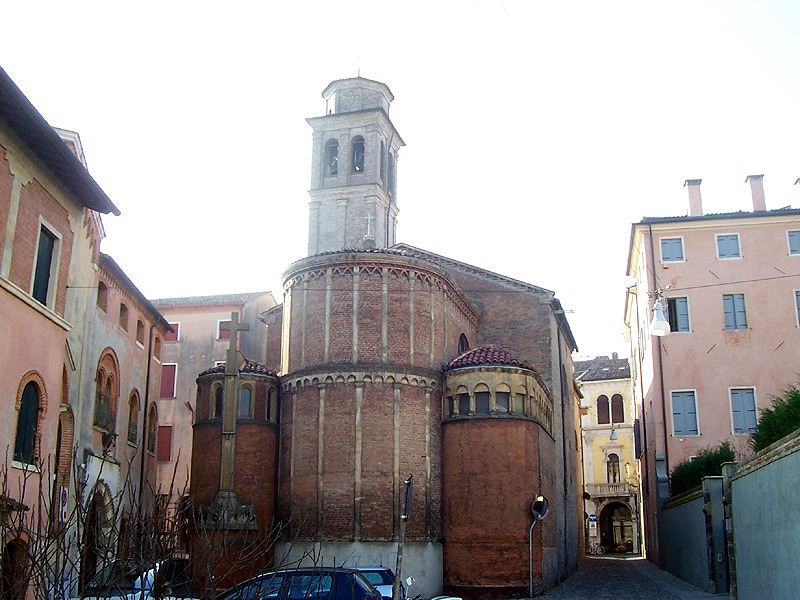
Neo-romanesque apse exterior

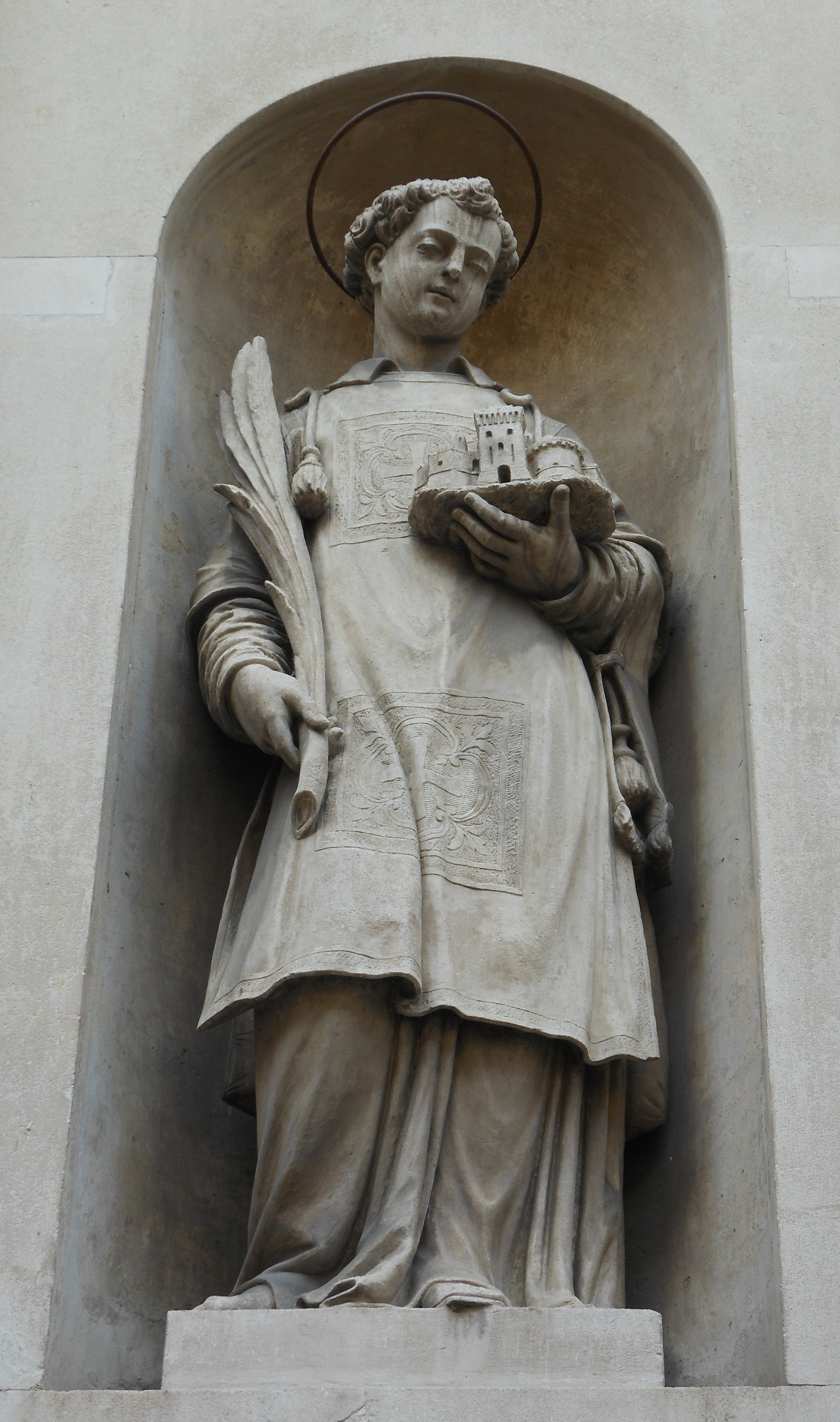
Statue of San Daniele on facade

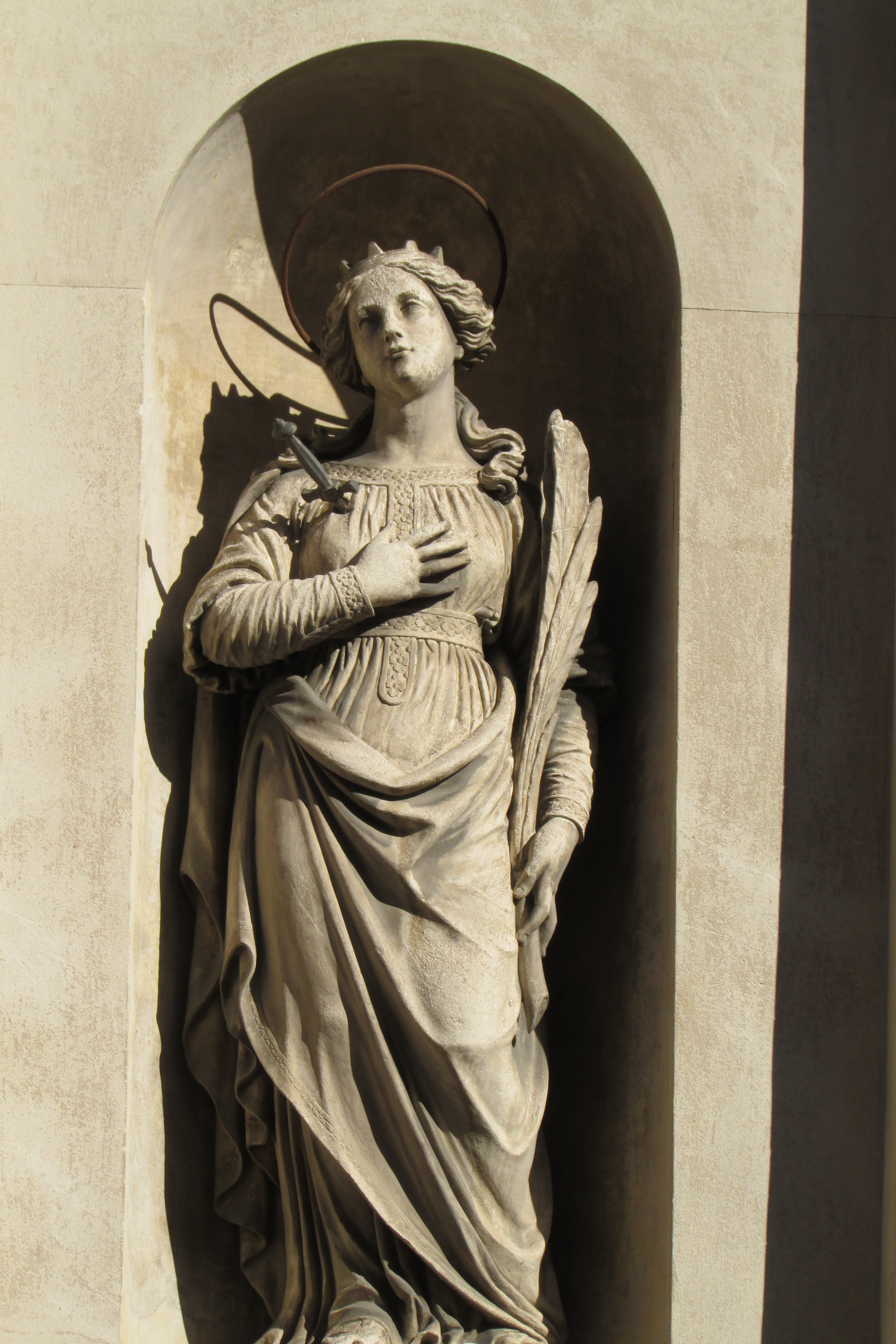
Statue of Santa Giustina on facade
